= Lancia Pu+Ra HPE =

Italian coupe concept

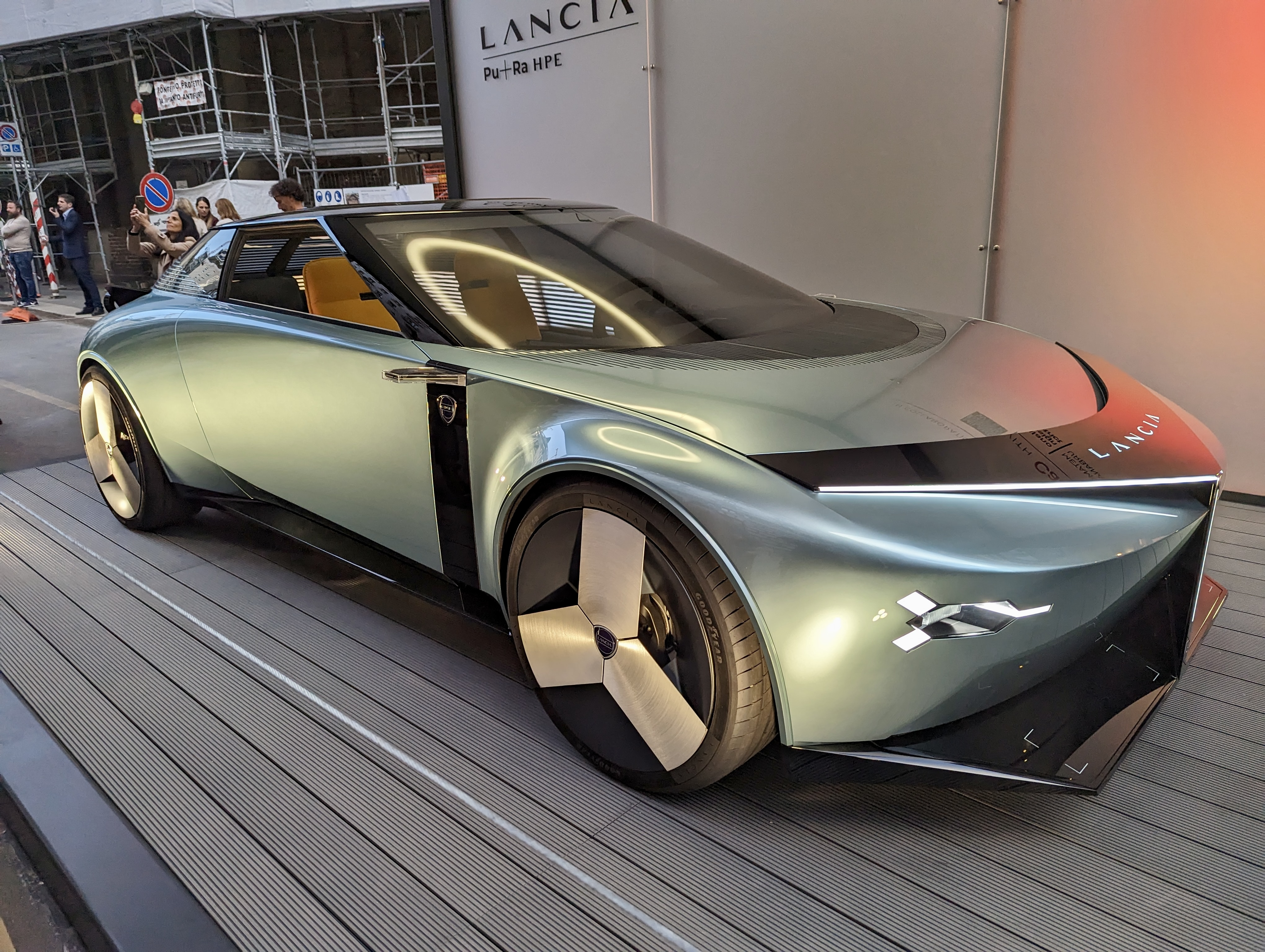

Overview
- Manufacturer: Lancia
- Production: 2023 (concept car)
- Designer: Frédéric Duvernier (exterior)

Body and chassis
- Class: Sports car (S); Compact car (C)
- Body style: 2-door coupe
- Platform: STLA EV platform

Powertrain
- Range: 700 km (435 mi)

Dimensions
- Length: 4,450 mm (175.2 in)
- Width: 1,950 mm (76.8 in)
- Height: 1,350 mm (53.1 in)

The Lancia Pu+Ra HPE is a concept car revealed on April 15, 2023. It was meant to showcase the styling and technology of future production models, including the all new Ypsilon.

Pu+Ra refers to the brand's new "pure and radical" design language, while HPE stands for "High Performance Electric" and commemorates the badge used by the Lancia Beta shooting brake.

== Overview ==
=== Design ===
The three-pointed light front fascia is a reinterpretation of Lancia's signature grille, and the pattern is carried over to other parts of the car such as the hubcaps. The rear features a steep trunk lid and circular taillights, directly inspired by the Stratos. Even the paint colour, a shade called Progressive Green, is a modernized version of Flaminia's Azzurro Vincennes.

The cabin, designed in collaboration with Italian furniture company Cassina, uses sustainable materials, in line with the concept's eco-friendly philosophy.

== See also ==
- List of Lancia concept cars
