= Concept car =

Car designed to showcase prototype features

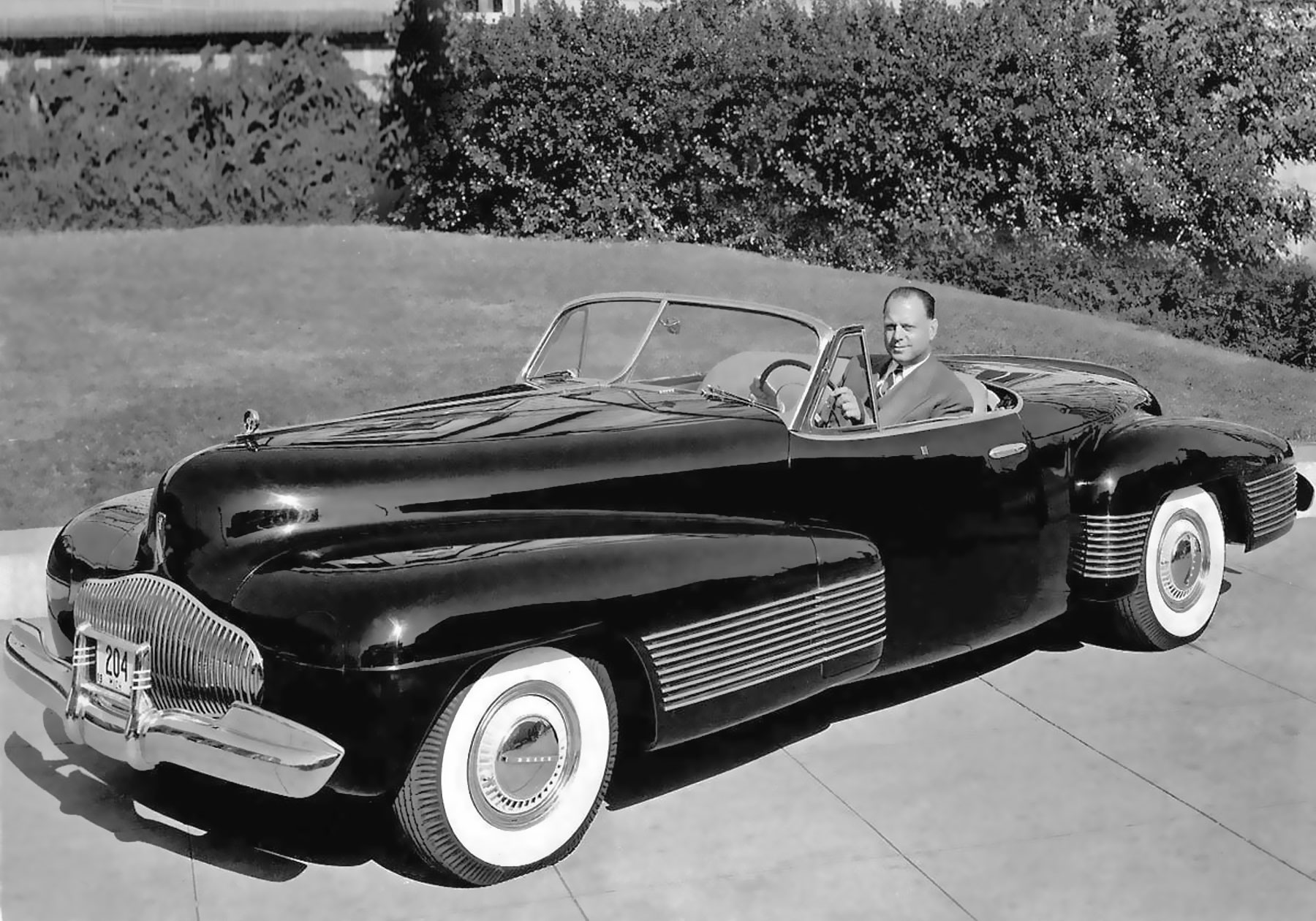
1938 Buick Y-Job, often considered to be the first concept car

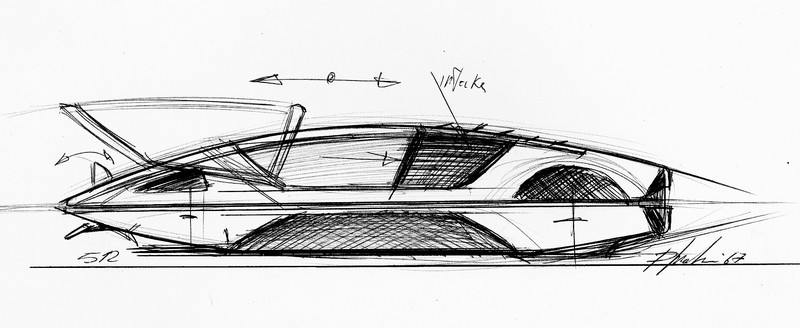
Concept sketch of the Ferrari Modulo by Paolo Martin (1967)

Toyota concept car showcased in Japan (2020)

A concept car (also known as a concept vehicle or show vehicle) is a car made to showcase new styling or new technology. Concept cars are often exhibited at motor shows to gauge customer reaction to new and radical designs which may or may not be produced.

General Motors designer Harley Earl is generally credited with inventing the concept car, and did much to popularize it through its traveling Motorama shows of the 1950s.

Concept cars never go into production directly. In modern times, all would have to undergo many changes before the design is finalized for the sake of practicality, safety, regulatory compliance, and cost. A "production-intent" prototype, as opposed to a concept vehicle, serves this purpose.

== Design ==
Concept cars are often radical in engine or design. Some use non-traditional, exotic, or expensive materials, ranging from paper to carbon fiber to refined alloys. Others have unique layouts, such as gullwing doors, three or five (or more) wheels, or special abilities not usually found on cars. Because of these often impractical or unprofitable leanings, many concept cars never get past scale models or even drawings. Other more traditional concepts can be developed into fully drivable (operational) vehicles with a working drivetrain and accessories. The state of most concept cars lies somewhere in between and does not represent the final product. A very small proportion of concept cars are functional to any useful extent, and some cannot move safely at speeds above 10 miles per hour (16 km/h).

Inoperative "mock-ups" are usually made of wax, clay, metal, fiberglass, plastic, or a combination thereof.

If drivable, the drivetrain is often borrowed from a production vehicle from the same company or may have defects and imperfections in design. They can also be quite refined, such as General Motors' Cadillac Sixteen concept.

== Notable concept cars ==
Model	Notes
Alfa Romeo BAT cars	1950s aerodynamic studies by Bertone.
Aston Martin Atom	Designed in 1939 by Claude Hill. Fully functional and still in road-worthy condition, it was adopted by Aston Martin owner David Brown into a racing car that won outright at the 1948 Spa 24 Hours and became the basis for the DB1.
Auburn Cabin Speedster	Considered the first concept car, it was built in 1929 and used for publicity, touring the car show circuit until it was destroyed in a fire at a Los Angeles exhibit that also consumed about 320 other cars on display.
Autobianchi A112 Runabout	Late 1960s Bertone (Marcello Gandini) designed sports car.
Autonova Fam	Early monovolume concept (mid 1960s) by Fritz Bob Busch, Michael Conrad, and Pio Manzù.
BMW GINA	A fabric-skinned shape-shifting sports car. This platform (aside from the body material and changing shape) was adopted in 2012 for the BMW i3 and BMW i8 Electric Vehicles.
Buick Y-Job	Designed in the late 1930s by the famous General Motors designer Harley Earl. Considered by most to be the first concept car. Inspired many other Buick vehicles, including the Buick Blackhawk Concept.
General Motors Le Sabre	Built by Harley Earl in 1951, it helped introduce 12-volt electrics and the aluminum 215 ci V8 to GM. This nameplate was transferred over to be a production vehicle.
Cadillac Cyclone	Built in 1959, it is one of Harley Earl's last designs. Its futuristic styling was heavily influenced by 1950s aviation and rocketry.
Cadillac Debutante	Reputedly the most luxurious car ever built at the time of its construction, the Cadillac Debutante was fitted with a leopard skin interior and 24 karat gold instrument panel and fittings.
Chevrolet Corvette Mako Shark	Previewed elements of the second (1963–1967) and third (1968–1982) generations of the production Corvette.
Cornell Safety Car	Project by Cornell University Aeronautical Laboratory and Liberty Mutual insurance company (mid 1950s).
Chevrolet Corvair Monza GT	1962 mid-engined experimental prototype that featured design elements of the third generation (1968–1982) of the production Corvette.
Dodge Tomahawk	A 2003 V10-powered four-wheel motorcycle-like design that drew attention for its audacity, and the debunked claim that it could hypothetically reach speeds of 300 to 420 mph (480 to 680 km/h).
Ferrari Modulo	Designed by Paolo Martin of the Italian carrozzeria Pininfarina, unveiled at the 1970 Geneva Motor Show.
Fiat City Taxi	Taxi concept by Pio Manzù (based on the Fiat 850) shown at the 1968 Turin Auto Show.
Ford 021C	Styling exercise (not intended for production) by Marc Newson and J Mays first shown at the 1999 Tokyo Motor Show.
Ford Gyron	Futuristic two-wheeled gyrocar designed by Syd Mead and McKinley Thompson first shown in 1961 at the Detroit Motor Show.
Ford Nucleon	A nuclear-powered car (scale model only).
Ford Probe	A series of four designs between 1979 and 1983 of which the Probe III was eventually developed into the Ford Sierra.
Ford SYNus	First shown in 2005. This design was developed to explore the creation of an ultra-safe roadgoing environment.
General Motors Firebird	A series of gas turbine–powered cars. Pontiac adopted this nameplate based on the Chevrolet Camaro. The nameplate was retired in 2002, along with the Chevrolet Camaro, which was revived in 2010.
Holden Efijy	Based around the Holden FJ, named the United States concept car of the year for 2007.
Hummer HX	A Hummer branded off-road compact SUV vehicle that is smaller-sized and lower-priced than the H2 and H3.
Jaguar Type 00	Controversial concept that accompanied the 2024 relaunch of Jaguar as an all electric brand.
Jaguar XJ220	Envisioned as a four-wheel drive supercar with a V12 engine, the concept car wasn't intended to be put into production until an overwhelming positive response from the 1991 British International Motor Show led to Jaguar doing a limited production run of the car.
Lancia Megagamma	The prototype for the modern MPV (minivan).
Lancia Stratos Zero	Marcello Gandini designed sports car presented at the 1970 Turin Auto Show.
Lincoln Futura	Built by Ghia and Designed by Bill Schmidt and John Najjar in 1955, the Futura would be modified into the Batmobile for the 1966 TV series Batman.
Maserati Boomerang	Giorgetto Giugiaro (Italdesign) concept first revealed at the 1971 Turin Motor Show.
Mercedes-Benz C111	A series of experimental automobiles produced in the 1960s and 1970s. The company was experimenting with new engine technologies, including Wankel engines.
Mercedes-Benz F700	Its PRE-SCAN road-scanning suspension enables a perfectly smooth ride, even on rough or bumpy terrains (developed later into Magic Body Control). This design will lead to the development of the next-generation Mercedes-Benz A-Class, Mercedes-Benz B-Class, and Mercedes-Benz C-Class.
MIT Car	The Massachusetts Institute of Technology concept car with Frank Gehry.
Opel Experimental GT	The first European concept car to go into series production. The concept was first shown at the 1965 Frankfurt Motor Show and garnered a frenzy response from the public and press. This concept became the basis for the Opel GT 3 years later.
Phantom Corsair	A 1930s concept car, developed by Rust Heinz.
Plymouth XNR	Open roadster with asymmetric features by Virgil Exner.
Pontiac Bonneville Special	Pontiac's first 2-seater sports car that debuted at the 1954 Motorama. This nameplate carried over to a Pontiac sports car of the 1950s.
Pontiac Club de Mer	Pontiac's all stainless steel sports car that debuted at the 1956 Motorama.
Porsche 989	Porsche's first 4-door car, a predecessor of the Porsche Panamera.
Porsche 918 Spyder	A plug-in hybrid sports car made to showcase the company's technology was first shown at the 2010 Geneva Motor Show. The concept garnered so much interest that it was later made in production in 2013.
Volvo VESC	Used as testbed in the development of safety features incorporated into the Volvo 240 series cars, used by the NHTSA as a basis for later safety standards, including self-retracting three-point seatbelts, crumple zones, head restraints, rollover protection, and shock-absorbing zero-damage bumpers.
Volkswagen Concept One	The retro-futurist design by J Mays and Freeman Thomas first shown in 1994 is a rare example of a concept car that was later produced.

== See also ==
- Concept art
- List of Alfa Romeo concept cars
- List of Audi concept cars
- List of BMW concept vehicles
- List of Citroën concept cars
- List of Dodge concept vehicles
- List of Lamborghini concept vehicles
- List of Lancia concept cars
- Pre-production car
- Production vehicle
- Product lifecycle management
- Proof-of-concept
- Show car
- Vision Gran Turismo

== Works cited ==
- Kosner, Anthony Wing (February 22, 2013). "The Sports Car, The Laptop And The Science Behind The Golden Proportion". Forbes.
- Manoukian, Julia (November 27, 2019). "The Psychology Of Luxury Car Buyers: 7 Considerations". Limelight.
- "The greatest ever Porsche art cars". Porsche. November 16, 2022.
