= List of Lancia concept cars =

A number of concept cars and prototypes bearing the Lancia badge or based on Lancia vehicles have been built by the manufacturer itself or by third-party designers and coachbuilders.

Concept car	Debut year and venue	Designer	Image
Lancia Aprilia Aerodinamica	1937	Pinin Farina	
Lancia Aprilia Pinin Farina Cabriolet	1947	Pinin Farina	
Lancia Ardea Pinin Farina	1947	Pinin Farina	
Lancia Ardea Panoramica	1949	Vieri Rapi / Zagato	
Lancia PF 200	1952	Pinin Farina	
Lancia Florida I	1955	Pinin Farina	
Nardi Raggio Azzurro I	1955	Giovanni Michelotti / Vignale	
Lancia Appia Cammello	1956	Zagato	
Lancia Florida II	1957	Pinin Farina	
Nardi Raggio Azzurro II	1958	Giovanni Michelotti / Vignale	
Lancia Flaminia Loraymo	1960; Paris Motor Show	Raymond Loewy	
Lancia Flaminia Spider Amalfi	1962	Rodolfo Bonetto / Boneschi	
Lancia Flaminia Coupé Speciale	1963	Tom Tjaarda / Pininfarina	
Lancia Fulvia Sport Spider	1968; Turin Motor Show	Zagato	
Lancia Flavia Super Sport	1969	Ercole Spada / Zagato	
Lancia Marica	1969	Tom Tjaarda / Ghia	
Lancia Fulvia Berlinetta Competizione	1969; Geneva Motor Show	Tom Tjaarda / Ghia	
Lancia Stratos Zero	1970	Marcello Gandini / Bertone	
Lancia Dunja	1971; Turin Motor Show	Aldo Sessano / Coggiola	
Lancia Stratos HF Prototipo	1971	Marcello Gandini / Bertone	
Lancia Mizar	1974	Giovanni Michelotti	
Lancia Megagamma	1978	Giorgetto Giugiaro / Italdesign	
Lancia Gamma Spider	1978	Pininfarina	
Lancia Sibilo	1978	Marcello Gandini / Bertone	
Lancia Delta	1978	Giorgetto Giugiaro / Italdesign	
Lancia Spider	1979		
Lancia Gamma Scala	1980	Pininfarina	
Lancia Medusa	1980	Giorgetto Giugiaro / Italdesign	
Lancia BCDE	1980	Giorgetto Giugiaro / Italdesign	
Lancia Gamma Olgiata	1982	Pininfarina	
Lancia A 112	1981	Giorgetto Giugiaro / Italdesign	
Italdesign Orca	1982; Turin Motor Show	Giorgetto Giugiaro / Italdesign	
Lancia Together	1984	Giorgetto Giugiaro / Italdesign	
Lancia ECV	1986		
Lancia ECV2	1988	Carlo Gaino / Synthesis Design	
Lancia HIT	1988; Turin Motor Show	Pininfarina	
Lancia Magia	1992	IAD	
Lancia Thema Coupé	1993	Coggiola	
Lancia Kayak	1995	Bertone	
Lancia Ionos	1997	Sbarro	
Lancia Dialogos	1998	Centro Stile Lancia	
Lancia Nea	2000	Centro Stile Lancia	
Stola S81 Stratos	2000	Marcello Gandini / Stola	
Lancia Granturismo	2002	Centro Stile Lancia	
Lancia Granturismo Stilnovo	2003	Centro Stile Lancia	
Lancia Fulvia Coupé	2003; Frankfurt Motor Show	Centro Stile Lancia	
Lancia Thesis Stola S85	2004	Stola	
Lancia Kandahar	2005	Leonardo Fioravanti	
Lancia Ypsilon Sport	2005	Zagato	
Lancia Haizea	2006	Istituto Europeo di Design	
Lancia Delta HPE Concept	2006	Centro Stile Lancia	
Lancia Flavia Concept	2011		
Lancia Pu+Ra HPE	2023	Centro Stile Lancia	
