= Fiat 127 =

Model series by Fiat

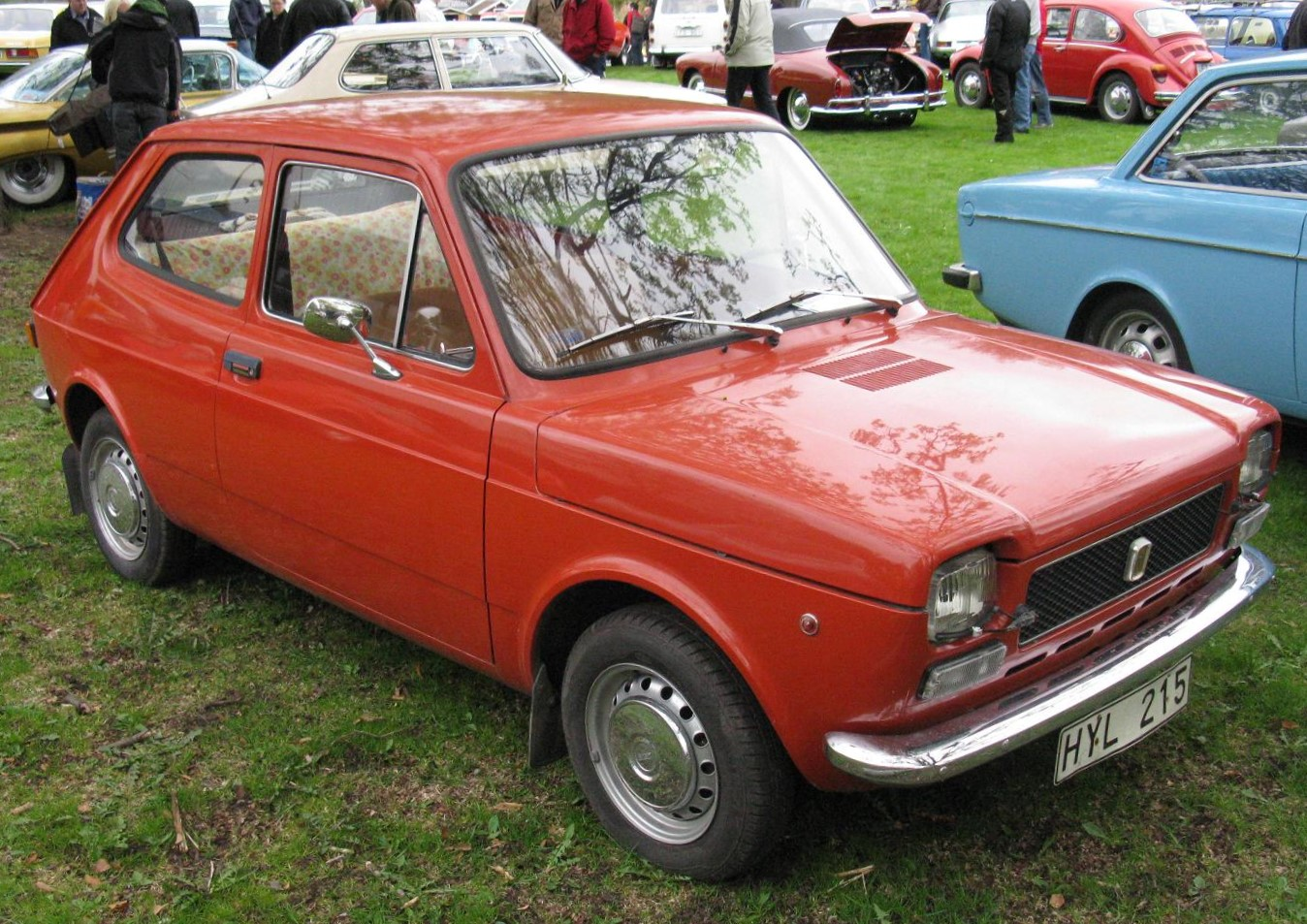
- A series 1 Fiat 127 2-door saloon

Overview
- Manufacturer: Fiat
- Also called: Nasr 127; Polski Fiat 127p; SEAT 127
- Production: 1971–1983
- Assembly: Italy: Turin (Mirafiori Plant); Spain: Barcelona (Zona Franca); Poland: Tychy (Polski Fiat); Egypt: Cairo (Nasr); Zambia: Livingstone (Livingstone Motor Assemblers Ltd); Morocco: Casablanca (Somaca)
- Designer: Dante Giacosa, Pio Manzù

Body and chassis
- Class: Supermini (B)
- Body style: 2-door saloon; 3-door hatchback; 4-door saloon (SEAT, Spain); 5-door hatchback (SEAT, Spain); 3-door station wagon (Brazil)
- Layout: Transverse front-engine, front-wheel-drive
- Related: Fiat 147; Fiat Fiorino; Autobianchi A112; SEAT Fura; Zastava Yugo

Chronology
- Predecessor: Fiat 850
- Successor: Fiat Uno

The Fiat 127 is a supermini car produced by Italian car manufacturer Fiat from 1971 to 1983. It was introduced in 1971 as the replacement for the Fiat 850. Production of the 127 in Italy ended in 1983 following the introduction of its replacement, the Fiat Uno, although the nameplate continued to be used on cars imported from Brazil.

The 127, designed by Pio Manzù, is generally regarded as one of the most influential small cars of all time, and as the car which defined the modern supermini – with its body configuration and engineering template being followed in almost all B-segment cars that followed; transverse engine layout, with an end-on mounted transmission, front wheel drive, and a hatchback.

== Series 1 ==
Series 1
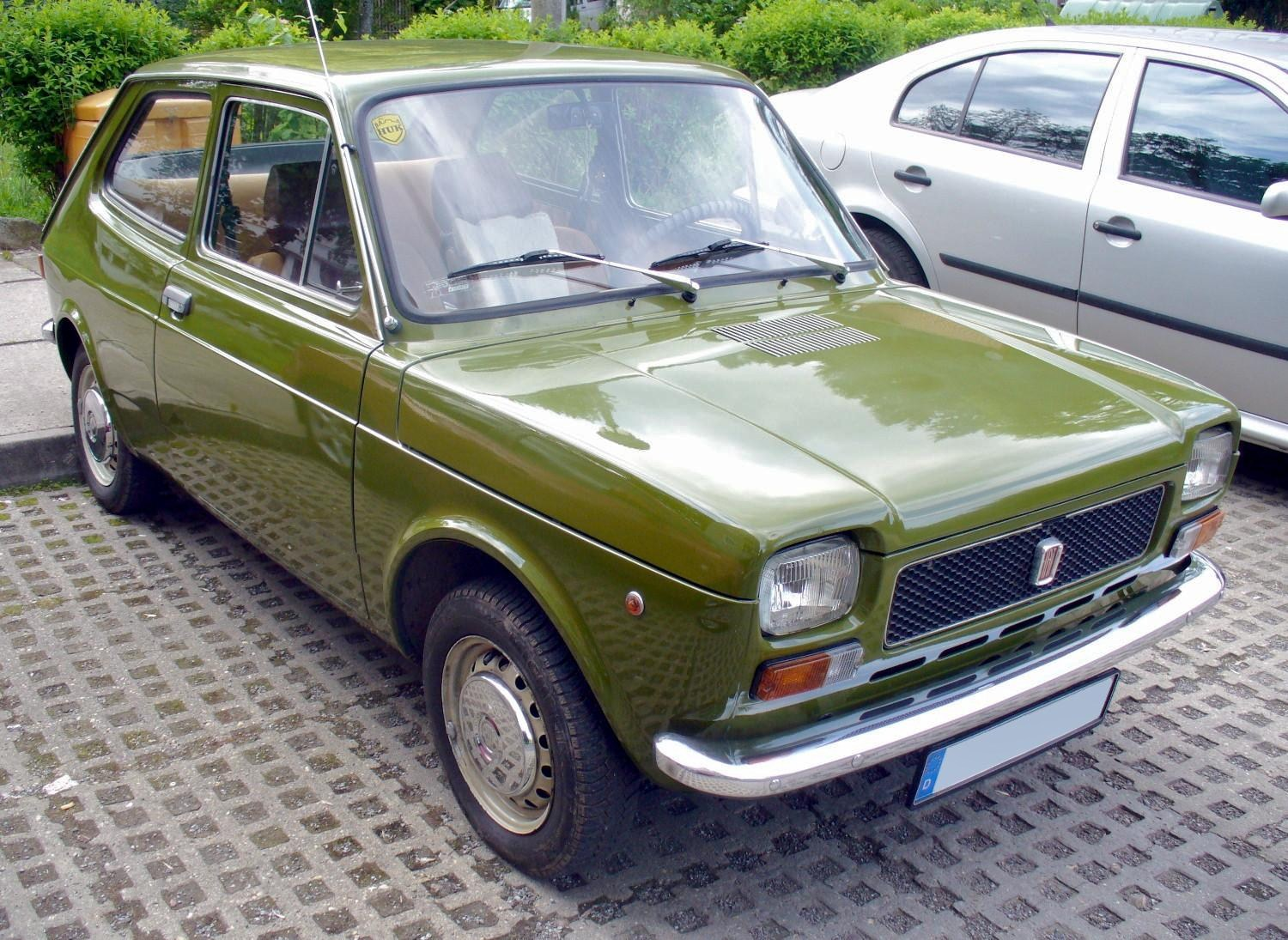

Overview
- Production: 1971–1977

Powertrain
- Engine: 903 cc 100 GL.000 OHV I4

Dimensions
- Wheelbase: 2,225 mm (87.6 in)
- Length: 3,595 mm (141.5 in)
- Width: 1,525 mm (60.0 in)
- Height: 1,325 mm (52.2 in)
- Curb weight: 705–710 kg (1,554–1,565 lb)

Developed towards the end of the 1960s, the Fiat 127 was launched as a two-door saloon in April 1971. A three-door hatchback, using an identical body profile but with a full-depth rear door and folding rear seat, was launched in March 1972; this would prove to be the most popular version of the 127. This was Fiat's first supermini-sized hatchback. The 127 featured a state-of-the-art transverse-engine/front-wheel-drive layout, with the transmission mounted on the end of the engine. Both design ideas had been fully vetted by Fiat, using its Autobianchi subsidiary 1964 Primula, 1969 A112 and A111 — precisely because the models were not targeted for large production. The larger Fiat 128, launched in 1969, was the first Fiat-badged car to use the same transverse powertrain layout. The 127, like the A112, used a shrunken version of the 128 platform, as well as the rugged Fiat OHV 100 series 903 cc engine that had powered the Autobianchi and, with various cylinder capacities, earlier generations of Fiat cars. The 127 also featured a unique transverse leaf spring suspension at the rear. Safety was another area of innovation: the 127 included an articulated steering column and crumple zones for progressive deformation under impact.

The car was one of the first of the modern superminis, and won praise for its use of space (80 percent of the floor space was available for passengers and luggage) as well as its road-holding. The hatchback version was launched the same year as the comparable Renault 5, and before the end of the 1970s most mass market European manufacturers were producing similar cars, including the Ford Fiesta and Volkswagen Polo, while General Motors added a three-door hatchback to the Opel Kadett range, which was reworked for British production and sold as the Vauxhall Chevette. The 127 was also one of the more popular imported cars on the UK market, peaking at more than 20,000 sales in 1978.

It was also the first car fitted with an all-polypropylene bumper on steel support. The 127 was an instant success, winning the European Car of the Year award for 1972, and quickly became one of the best-selling cars in Europe for several years. It was the third Fiat in six years to receive this accolade.

In June 1974, slightly over three years after the model's introduction, Fiat reported that the one millionth 127 had been completed at the Mirafiori plant in Turin, after just over three years in production. The (in its time) hugely successful Fiat 600 had taken seven years to reach that same milestone.

The Series 1 car changed little during its lifetime. However, in May 1973 saloons became available in both standard and (in the UK) deluxe versions. In autumn 1974 the 127 Special variant was released which featured a restyled front grille and extra chrome outside, a new dashboard, carpet instead of rubber floor mats, better seats with reclining seat backs, opening hinged rear side windows and more amenities as standard equipment. The two-door version received a 3 cm (1.2 in) lower rear window for a better rear view, which improvement was also made on the standard model. In early 1976, the 127's engine was lightly modified to help it meet new emissions standards. A new carburetor and adjusted valve timing lowered power by two horsepower but also increased fuel economy by about ten percent.

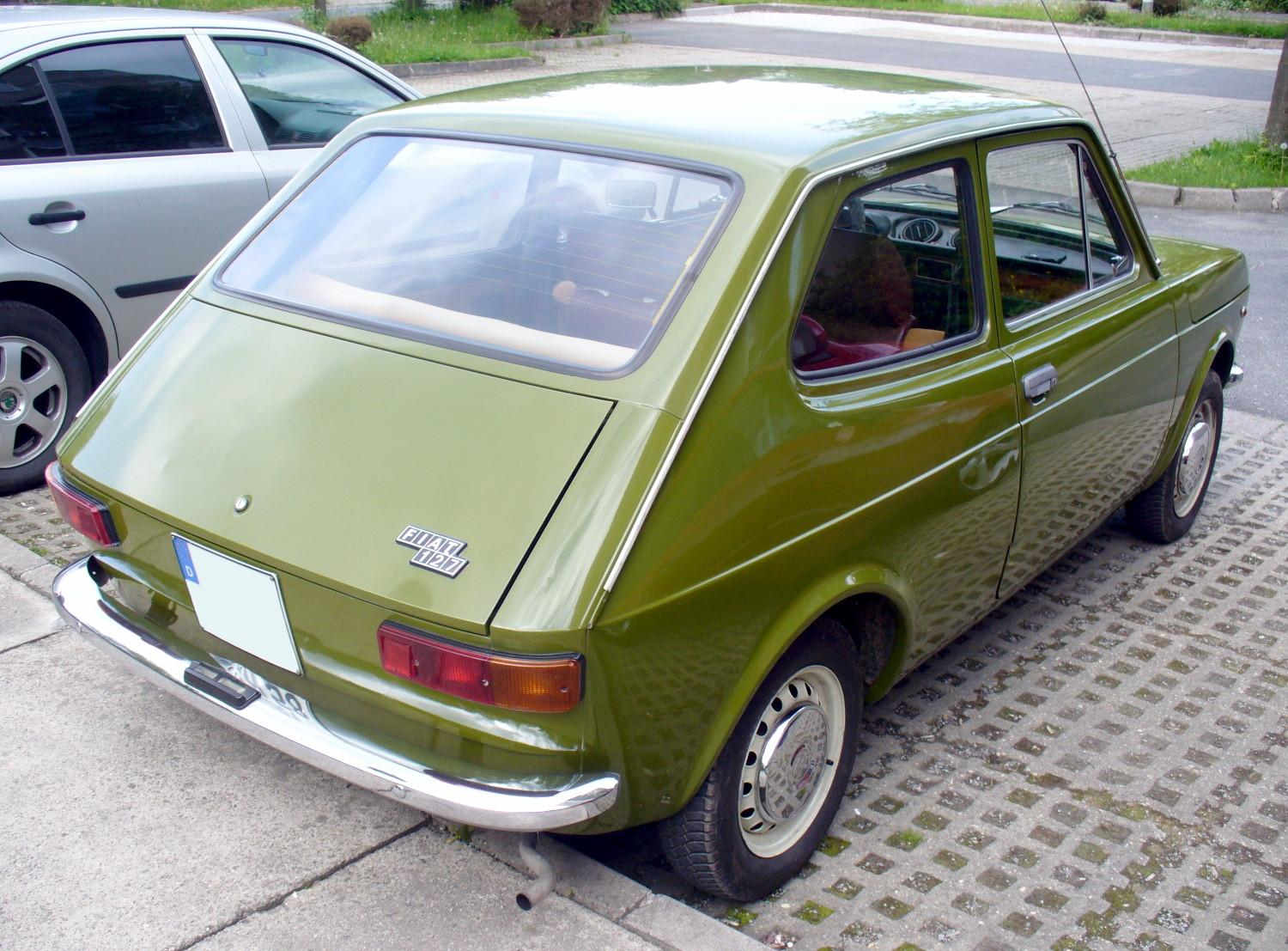
Fiat 127 2-door saloon rear

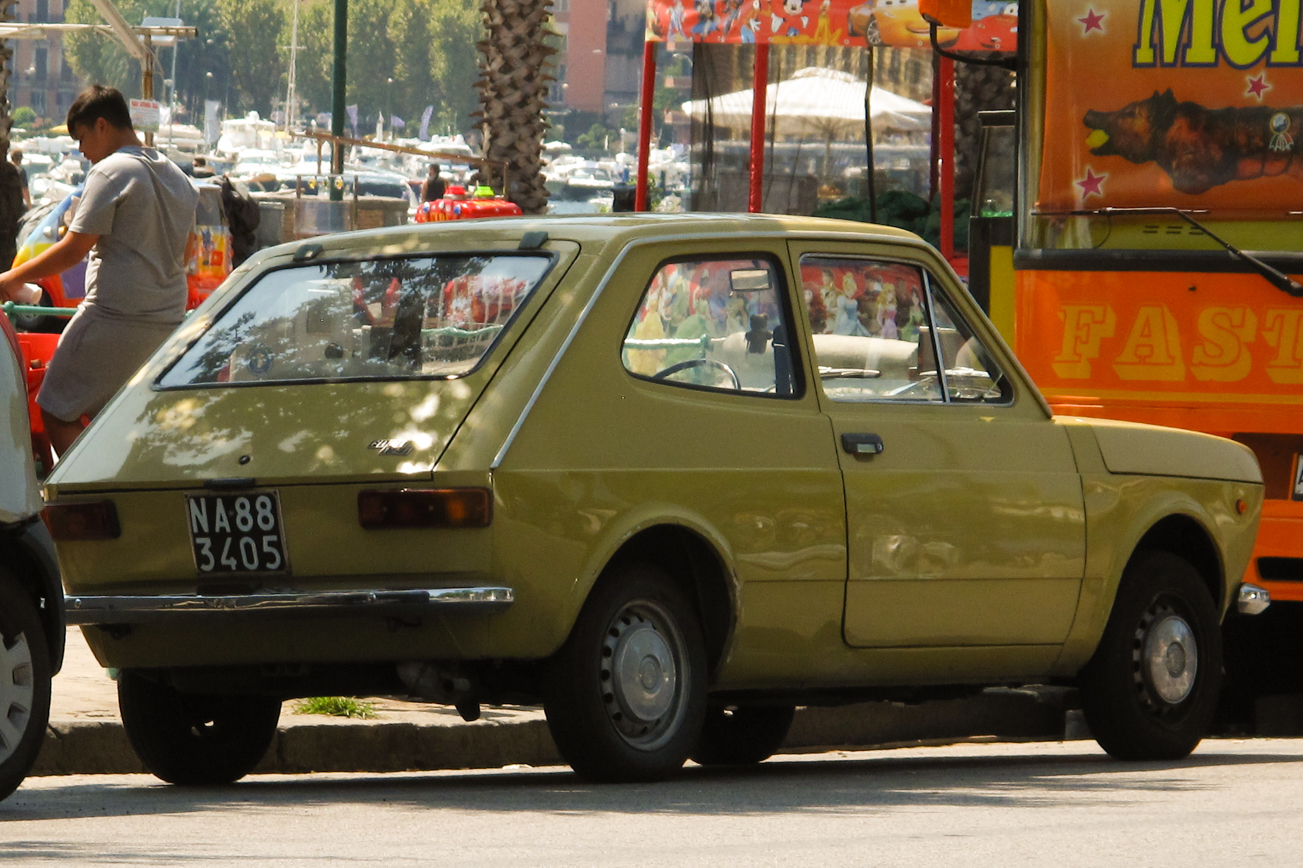
Fiat 127 3-door hatchback rear

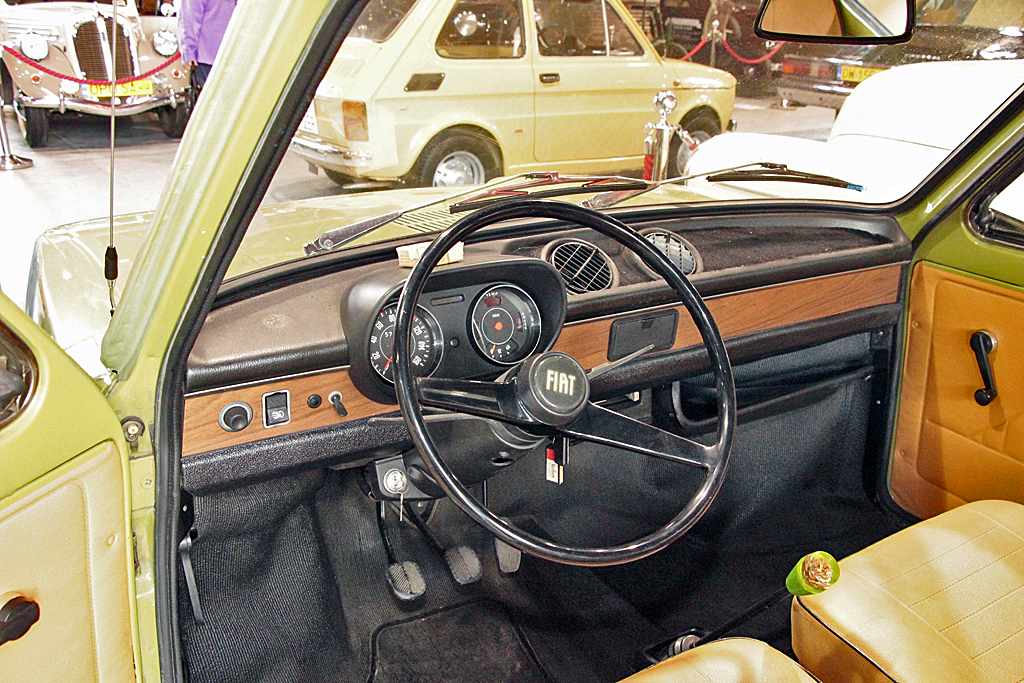
Fiat 127 interior

== Series 2 ==
Series 2
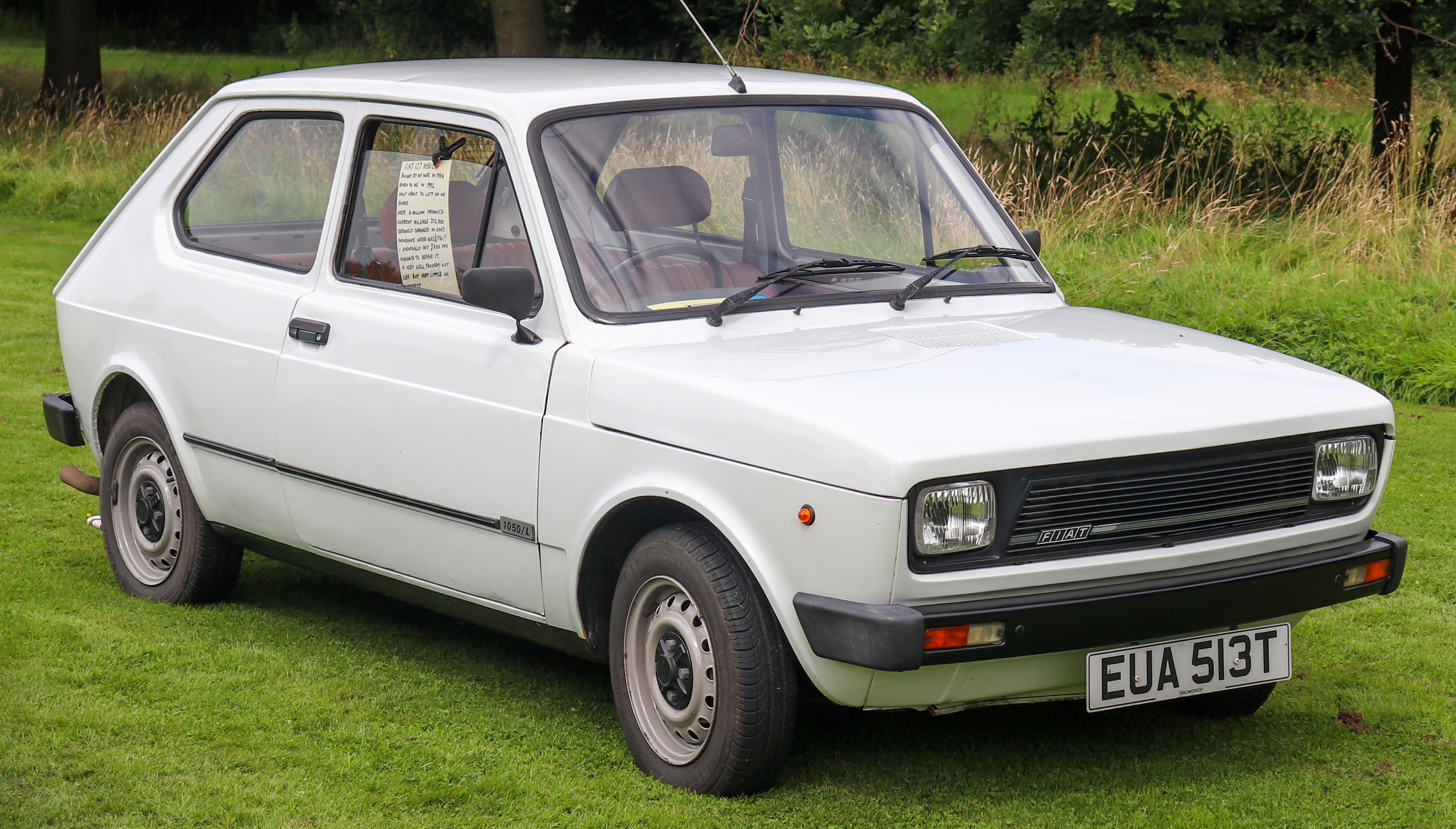

Overview
- Production: 1977–1981

Powertrain
- Engine: petrol: 903 cc 100 GL.000 OHV I4; 1049 cc 127 A.000 OHC I4; diesel: 1301 cc 127 A5.000 OHC I4

Dimensions
- Wheelbase: 2,225 mm (87.6 in)
- Length: 3,645 mm (143.5 in)
- Width: 1,527 mm (60.1 in)
- Height: 1,358 mm (53.5 in)
- Kerb weight: 705–730 kg (1,554–1,609 lb)

The Series 2 version of the 127 debuted in May 1977. Although the bodyshell remained fundamentally the same, the Series 2 hinted towards a more angular styling direction which would be seen in the Ritmo/Strada the following year. It featured a restyled front and rear and larger rear side windows, losing the upswept belt line of the Series 1, as well as adding a distinctive "Hofmeister kink" on the C-pillar. The new rear quarter pressings were derived from those used on the Brazilian market Fiat 147, although without the rear quarter extraction vent used in South America. A larger, 1049 cc engine with 50 PS (37 kW) was also added — uniquely for the 127 this was the five-bearing OHC "Brazil" engine from the 147 rather than the Fiat OHC unit from the 128. The tailgate was extended and now reached nearly to the rear bumper, addressing complaints about the high lip over which luggage had to be lifted for loading into the earlier 127 hatchbacks. The interior was revised with a new dashboard which was identical in layout to the original car but was plainer in appearance and lost the wood embellishment of the Series 1. The underside of the dashboard was tidied up with new cover panels to enclose the steering column, brake master cylinder (on right hand drive versions) and the pedal mechanisms. There were three equipment levels: L, C and CL.

A new Sport model was available from June 1978 which featured a high output 70 PS (51 kW) version of the standard 1049 cc engine. This was achieved by incorporating Abarth revisions to the head with larger valves and an Abarth exhaust system and the use of a twin choke Weber carburetor. Changes were also made to the gearbox final ratio to improve the performance. The Sport model has bespoke high back sporty cloth seats with either blue or orange piping and bespoke racing wing mirrors as well as a rev counter, sports wheels, sports leather steering wheel and sport three-piece stripe with 127 Sport decals. It was available in three colours, Black with orange stripes, Silver with black stripes and Orange with black stripes.

In March 1980, the 147 Panorama went on sale in several European markets with "127" badging, originally only with the 1050 engine. The Panorama used the 147's recently updated "Europa" front, with reverse-angled rectangular headlights and blocky combined marker-lights/turn signals wrapping around the corners. In April 1980 the 127 C 5-door version was added to the Italian lineup. There was also a "high-cube" panel van version, known as the Fiorino, which was based on the Series 2 bodyshell. This remained in production until the end of 1987, when a new Uno-based Fiorino debuted.

In March 1981, the series 2 was mildly changed: the three equipment levels L-C-CL became two (Special and Super), while Sport remained Sport. Mechanically, nothing changed, but a number of small cosmetic touch-ups, new upholstery and new colours were introduced, and the Super got some of the appointments first seen in the 127 Top (127 Palio in the UK), a limited edition issued in June 1979.

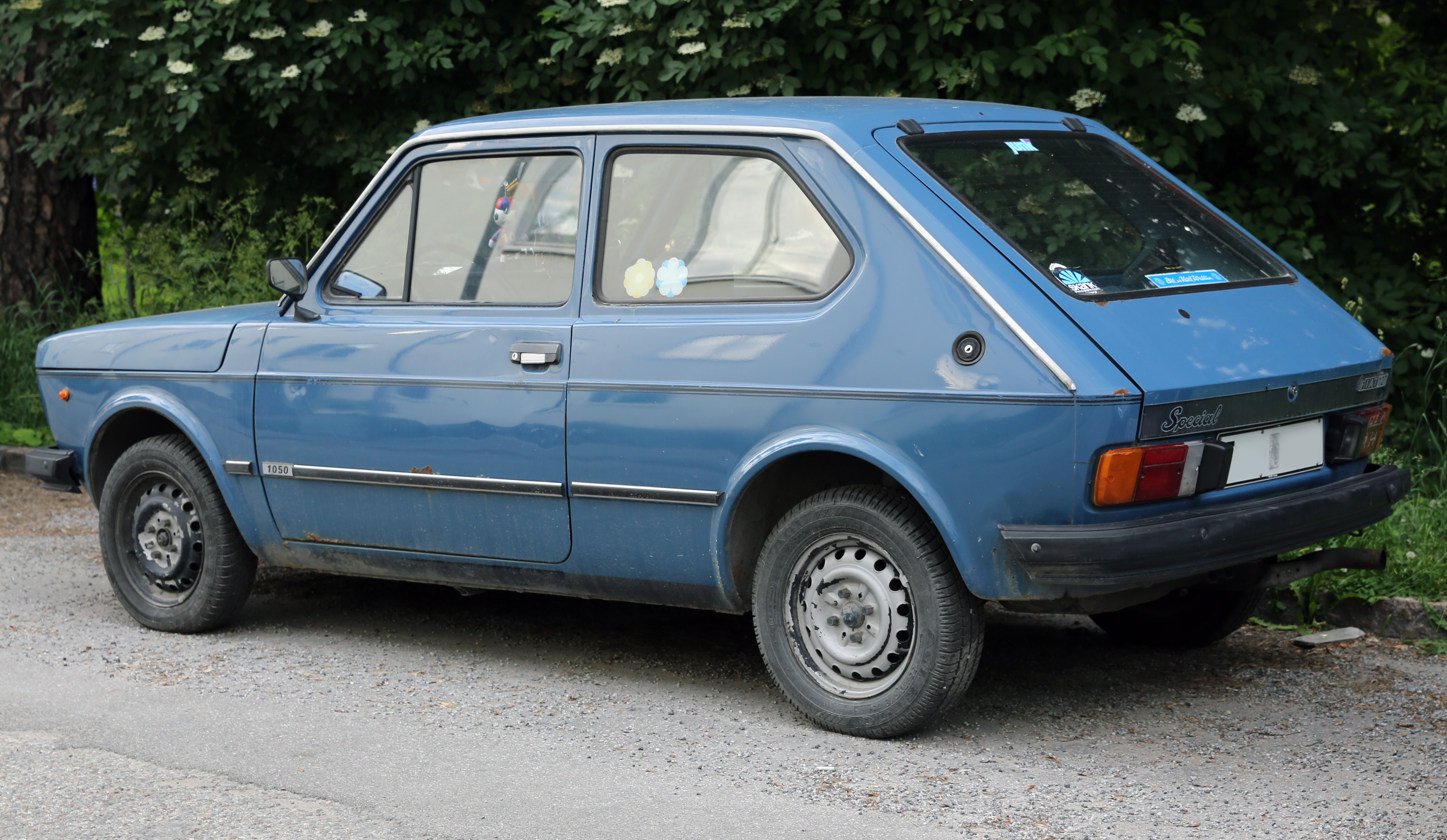
Rear view (1981 1050 L Special)

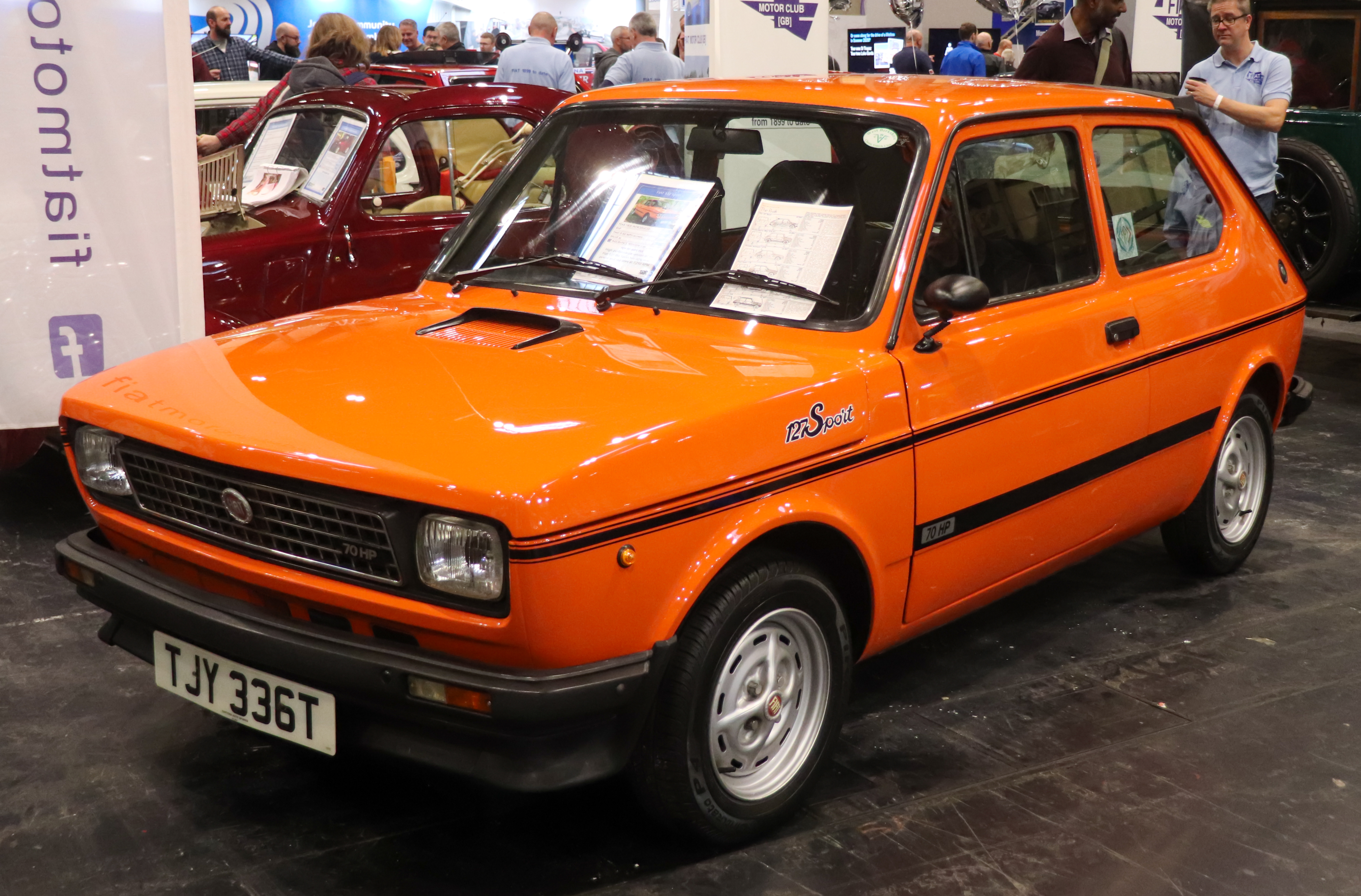
Fiat 127 Sport

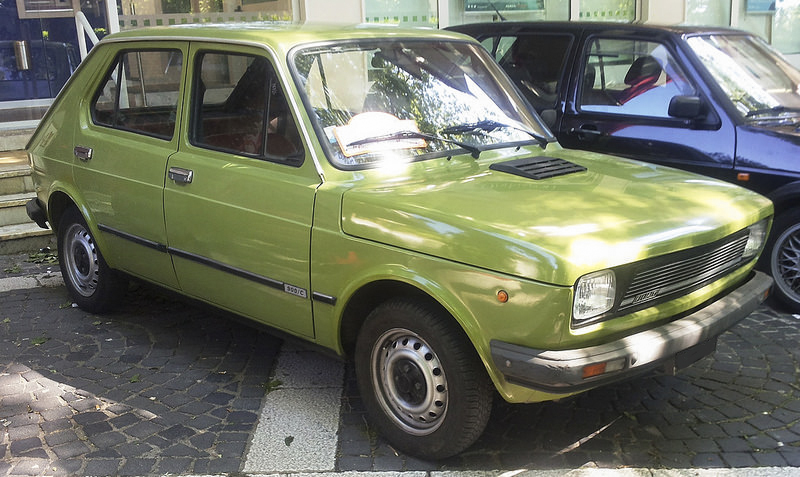
1980 127 900C 5-door (a rebadged SEAT 127)

=== Brazilian-built versions ===
The 147 itself went on sale in Italy under the name of 127 Rustica in 1979. This was a version meant for light off-road work, and received a spartan appearance and equipment. The 127 Rustica benefitted from the 147's stronger body, 1050 cc engine, reinforced suspension ("tropical" type springs front and rear), and a skid plate. The front and rear lights were protected by mesh grilles mounted on model-specific tubular metal bumpers, while it had the Brazilian dashboard and specific, lightly padded seats with a tubular structure and covered in brown leatherette. The Rustica was only offered with semi-matte military beige paint, black rims without hubcaps and winter tires, with the only option being a metal luggage rack. Noisy and very particular, the Rustica was removed from price lists in 1981 without a proper replacement until the 1983 introduction of the Panda 4x4. The Rusticas were assembled in Lamborghini's Sant'Agata Bolognese plant.

At the 1981 Geneva Motor Show, a diesel-engined version of the 127 was introduced with hatchback or Panorama bodywork. The diesel Series 2 was only built in Brazil and is technically a rebadged 147; it uses that model's headlight treatment which it shared with the 127 Panorama. The 147 had a stronger structure to better handle Brazilian roads and was considered more suitable for the additional weight and vibrations of the diesel engine. The Panorama and Diesel versions retained this design even as the Italian-made 127 changed over to the Series 3. From 1983, the "127 Unificata" introduced the same design across the entire 127/147 lineups.

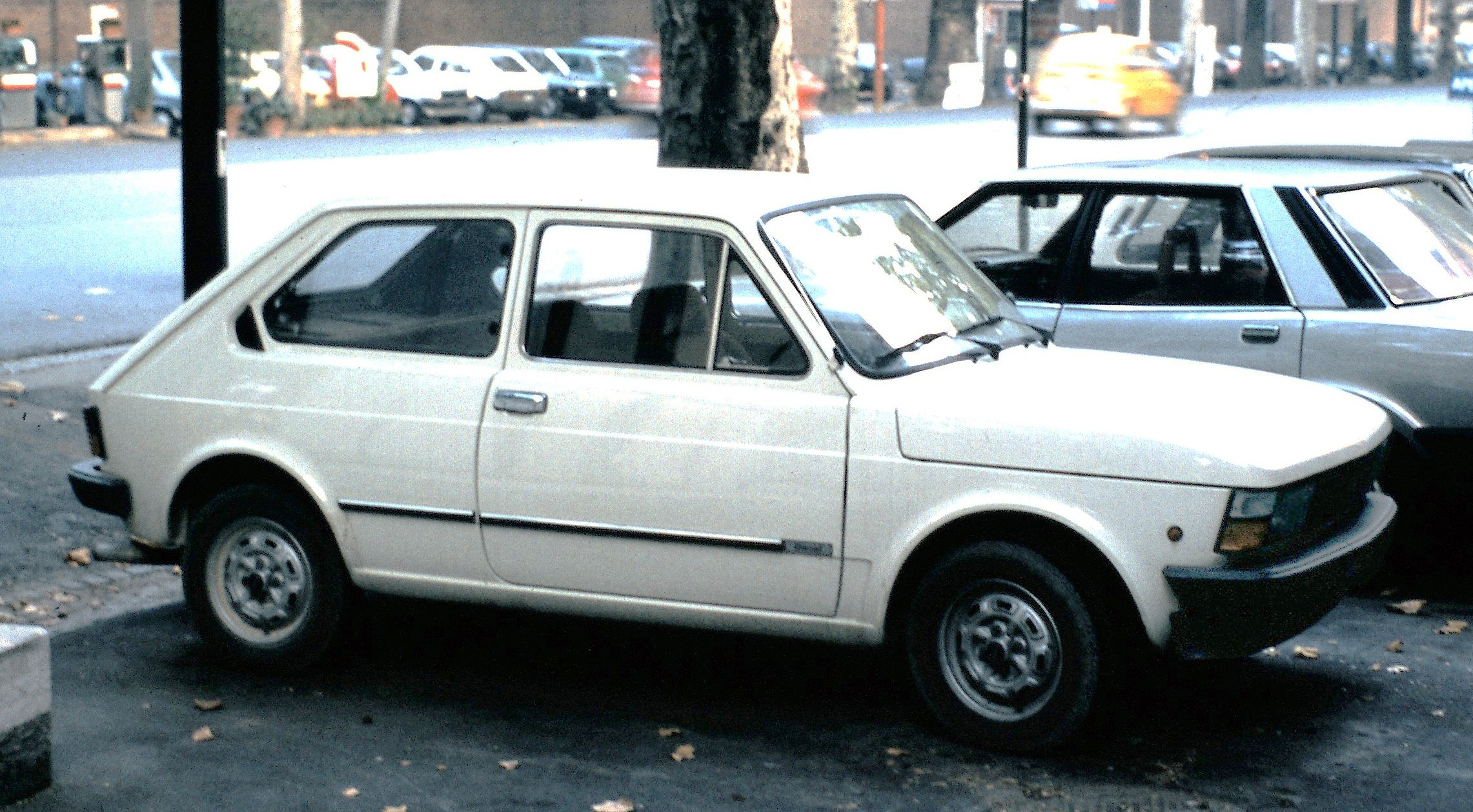
Fiat 127 Diesel (a rebadged 147 with the "Europa" front)

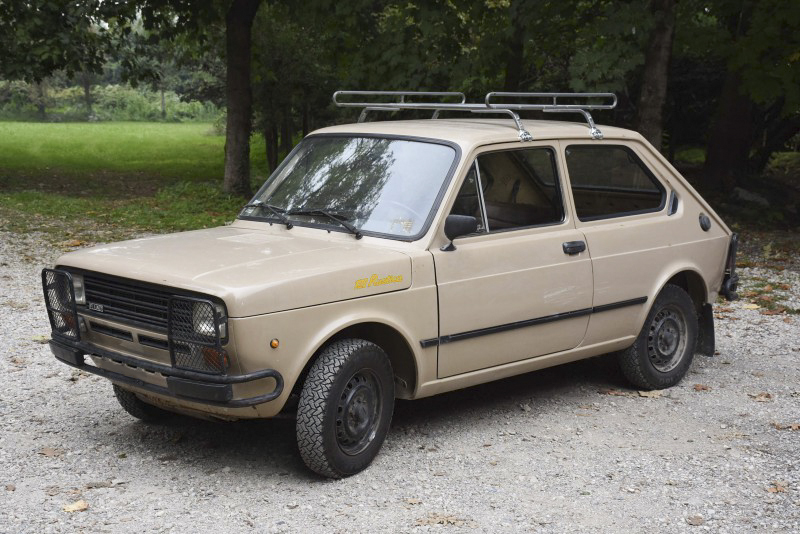
Fiat 127 Rustica (with the 147's original taller front)

== Series 3 ==
Series 3
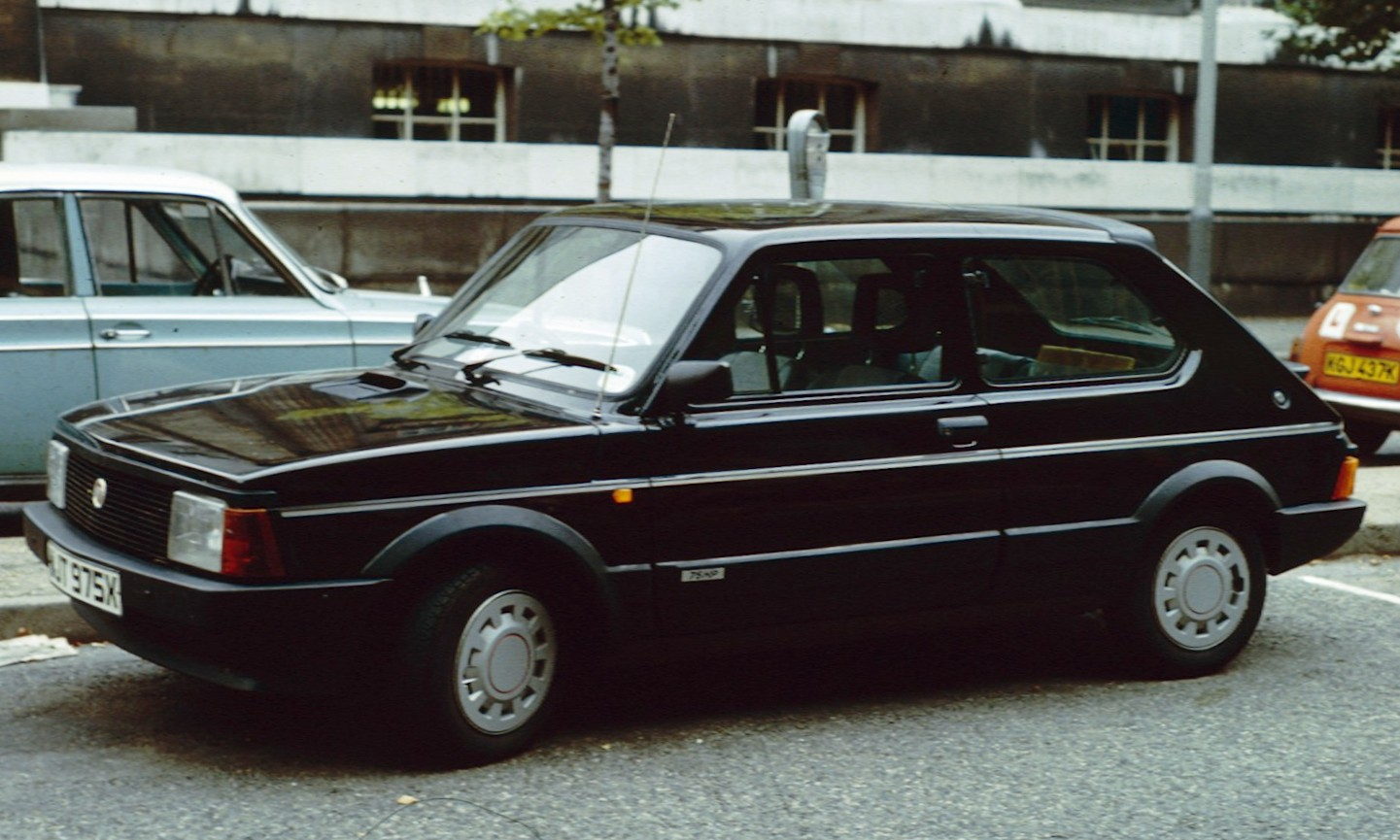
- Fiat 127 Sport (Series 3)

Overview
- Also called: Nasr 127 (Egypt)
- Production: 1982–1983; 1982–1987 (Egypt)

Powertrain
- Engine: 903 cc 100 GL.000 OHV I4; 965 cc A112 B1.054 OHV I4 (CH); 1049 cc 127 A.000 OHC I4; 1301 cc 127 A3.000 OHC I4; 1301 cc 127 A5.000 diesel I4

Dimensions
- Wheelbase: 2,225 mm (87.6 in)
- Length: 3,711 mm (146.1 in)
- Width: 1,536–1,552 mm (60.5–61.1 in)
- Height: 1,370 mm (54 in)
- Curb weight: 710–730 kg (1,570–1,610 lb)

Despite a completely new replacement being only a year away, the Series 3 was presented in November 1981 and launched in Italy and other European markets in January 1982. It is distinguishable from the Series 2 by its grille, headlights, rear lights and the use of plastic elements on the front, sides and rear. Body panels are all as before, except for a longer bonnet required to clear the larger headlights. The third series received a completely new dashboard design and interior, following the design language first seen in the Ritmo. The version names remained Special, Super and Sport. The 1301 cc Fiat Fiasa engine replaced the earlier 1050 in the Series 3 Sport. New for the Series 3 was also the option of a five-speed manual transmission, a first for the 127 as it had not fit in earlier models. It was available in the 1050 Super (called "Comfort" in some markets) and was also installed in the 127 Sport. The new 127 Sport cost less than its more highly strung predecessor, and had more power from its larger engine. It remained on sale in Italy until December 1983, when the Uno Turbo replaced it.

In nations like Norway, Denmark and Finland this generation was particularly successful. For 1983, Swiss buyers received the Autobianchi A112's 965 cc engine rather than the 903 cc unit in the 127 Special, so that the importer would not have to make two similar engines pass local emissions standards. Fiat also bumped up the compression ratio and installed a somewhat larger carburetor in the 1.05-litre 127 Super, increasing power somewhat so as to maintain its power advantage over the lesser 127 Special.

The 127 was replaced as Fiat's high volume product in this sector by the Fiat Uno in January 1983, though Italian manufacture continued until the end of 1983 and it continued in production in South America until 1995. The 127 disappeared from the right-hand drive British market soon after the Uno went on sale there in June 1983.

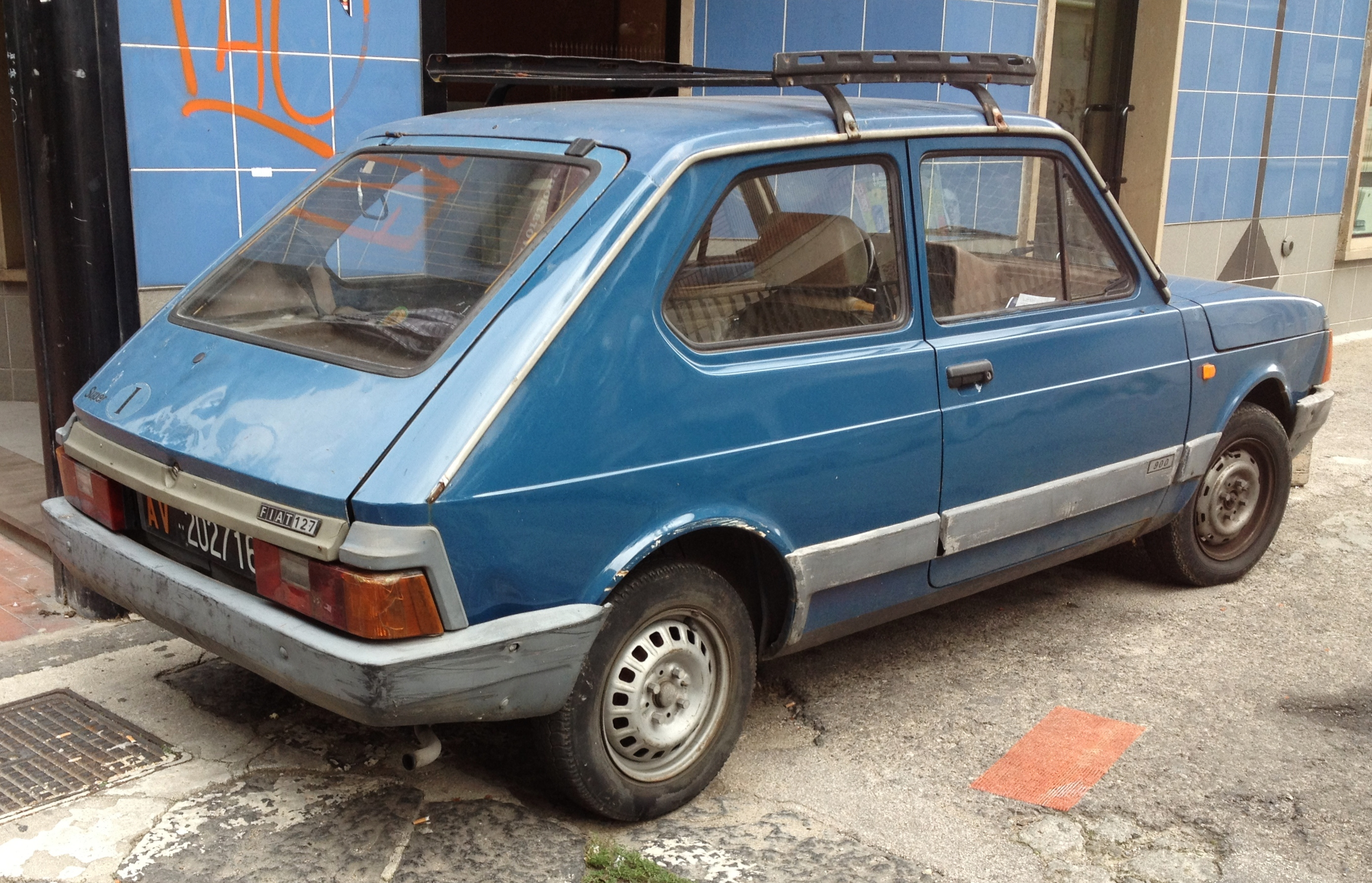
Series 3 rear view

== Series 4: 127 Unificata ==
Series 4
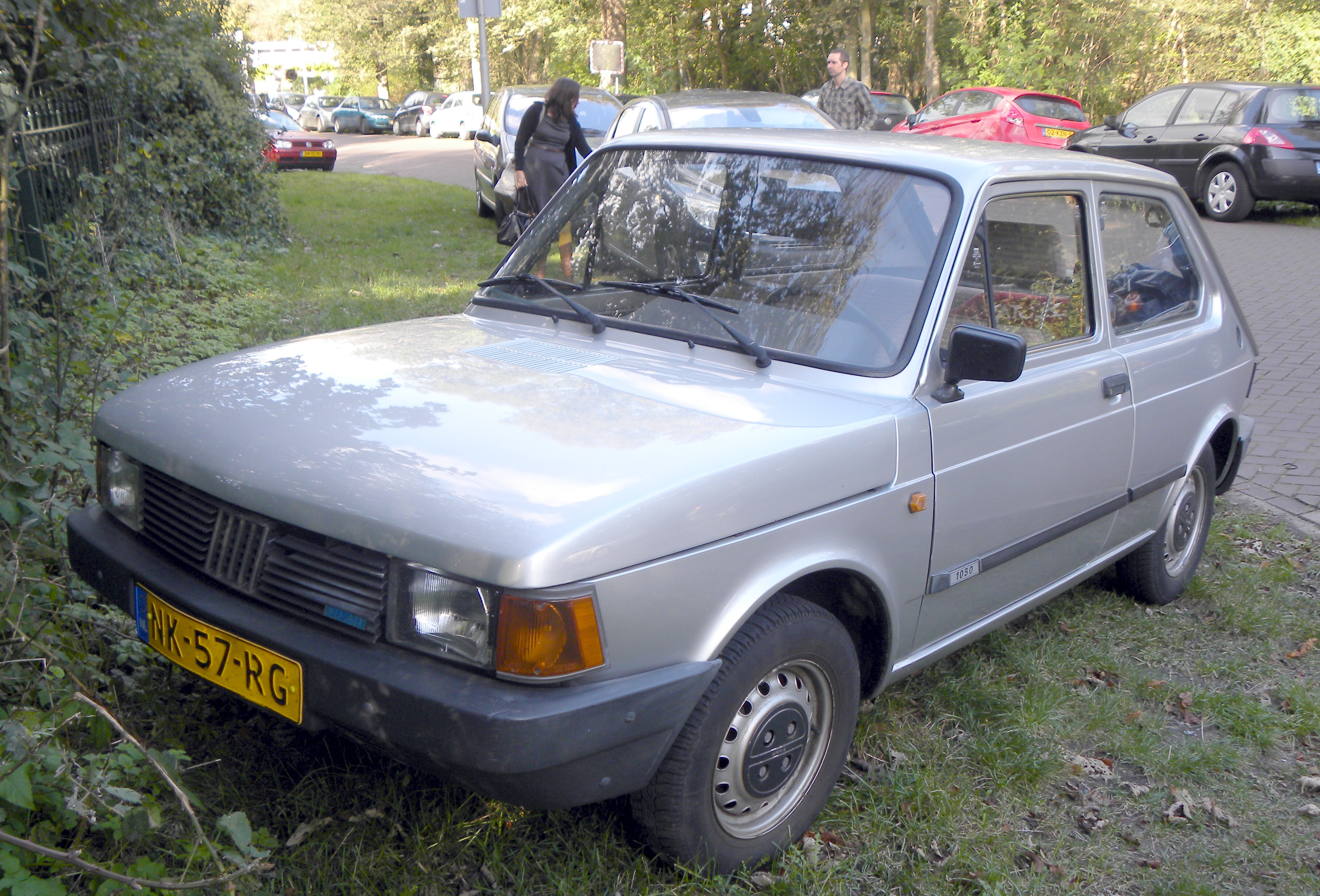
- Fiat 127 Unificata (Series 4)

Overview
- Production: 1983–1987

Powertrain
- Engine: 1049 cc 127 A.000 OHC I4; 1301 cc 127 A5.000 diesel I4

Dimensions
- Wheelbase: 2,225 mm (87.6 in)
- Length: 3,743 mm (147.4 in)
- Width: 1,545 mm (60.8 in)
- Height: 1,405 mm (55.3 in)
- Curb weight: 795–835 kg (1,753–1,841 lb)

After Italian production ended, Fiat imported the South American 127 Unificata to Europe until 1987, albeit only for left-hand drive markets. It is called "Unificata" (unified) as all models now received the same design; until then, Brazilian-made cars had their own design, meaning that 127 Diesel and Panorama models had been of very different appearance than their Series 2 and Series 3 siblings. The Unificata range was condensed, leaving only the 1050 petrol engine and the diesel. The five-door version was also discontinued, although SEAT kept offering this bodystyle on their Fura until 1986.

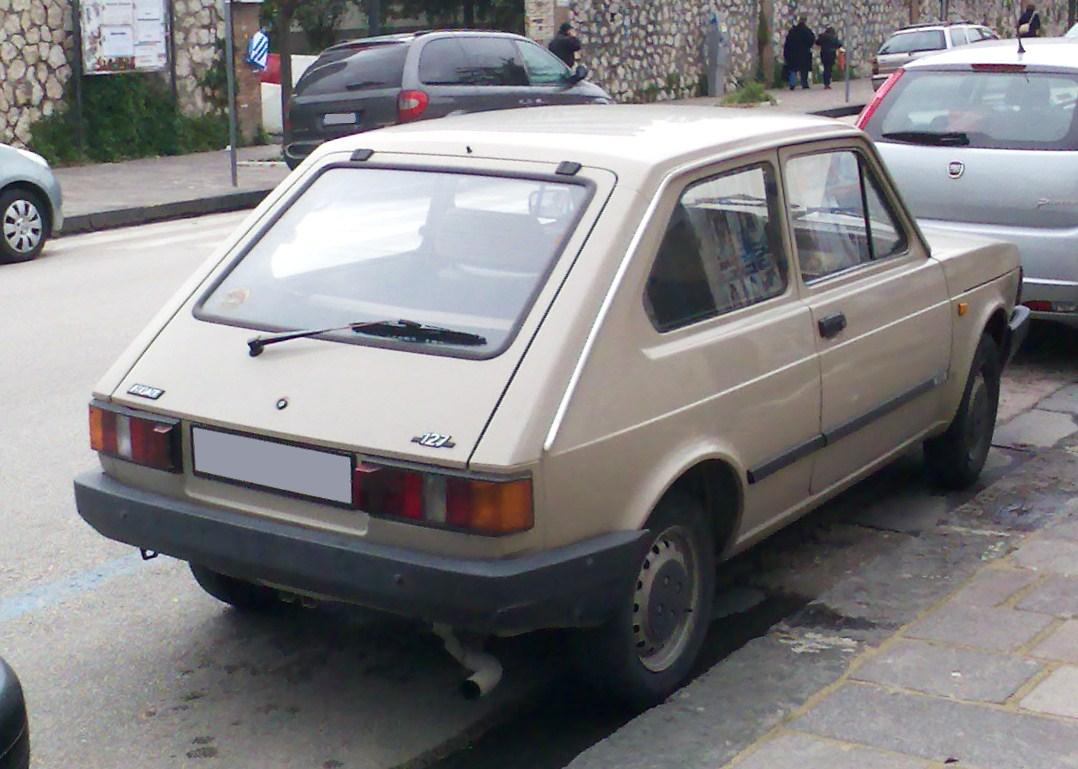
Unificata rear view; same design as on the 147

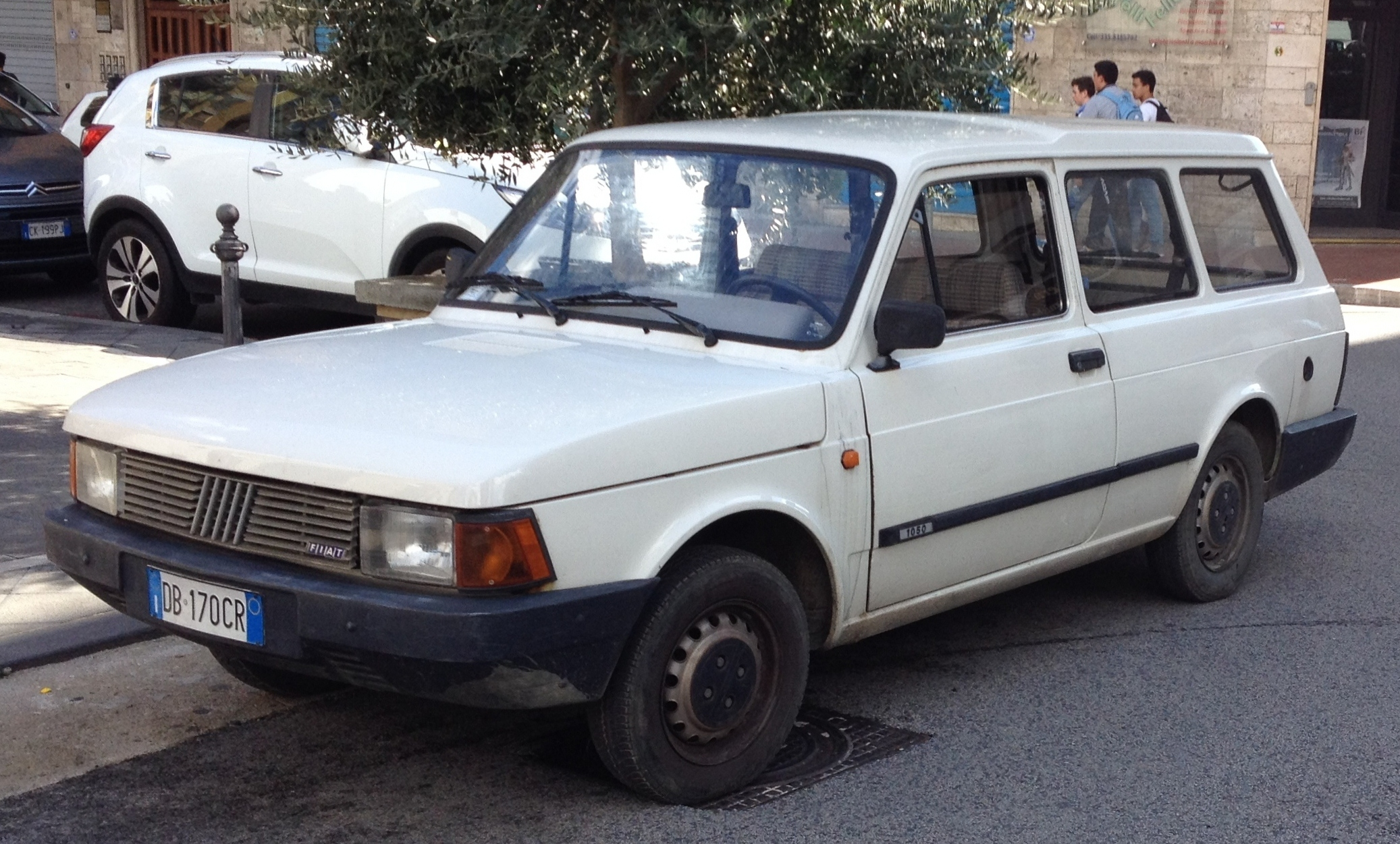
Fiat 127 Panorama

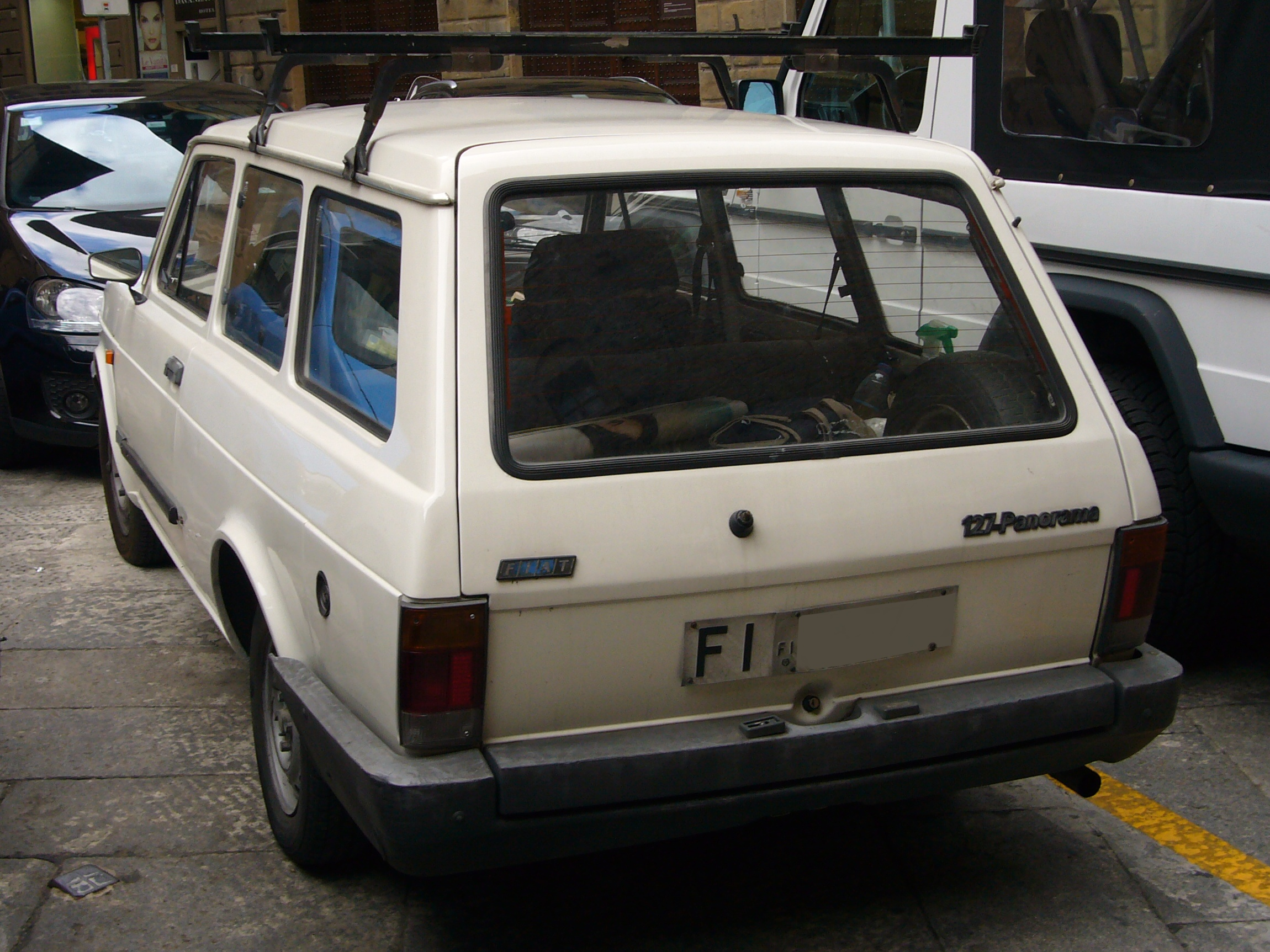
Panorama, rear view

== Engines ==
Engine	Cyl.	Power	Torque	CR	Years	Notes
903 cc OHV	I4	47 PS (35 kW; 46 hp)	62 N⋅m (46 lb⋅ft)	9.0 : 1	1971–1976	
903 cc OHV	I4	45 PS (33 kW; 44 hp)	64 N⋅m (47 lb⋅ft)	9.0 : 1	1976–1983	
903 cc OHV	I4	40 PS (29 kW; 39 hp)	64 N⋅m (47 lb⋅ft)	7.8 : 1		Low octane
965 cc OHV	I4	48 PS (35 kW; 47 hp)	72 N⋅m (53 lb⋅ft)	9.2 : 1	1983	Switzerland
1049 cc OHC	I4	50 PS (37 kW; 49 hp)	77 N⋅m (57 lb⋅ft)	9.3 : 1	1977–1987	
1049 cc OHC	I4	52 PS (38 kW; 51 hp)	76 N⋅m (56 lb⋅ft)	9.5 : 1	1983	Switzerland
1049 cc OHC	I4	70 PS (51 kW; 69 hp)	83 N⋅m (61 lb⋅ft)	9.8 : 1	1978–1981	127 Sport
1301 cc OHC	I4	75 PS (55 kW; 74 hp)	103 N⋅m (76 lb⋅ft)	9.75 : 1	1981–1983	127 Sport
1301 cc diesel	I4	45 PS (33 kW; 44 hp)	75 N⋅m (55 lb⋅ft)	20.1 : 1	1981–1987	Brazil-built

== International variants ==
=== SEAT 127 ===
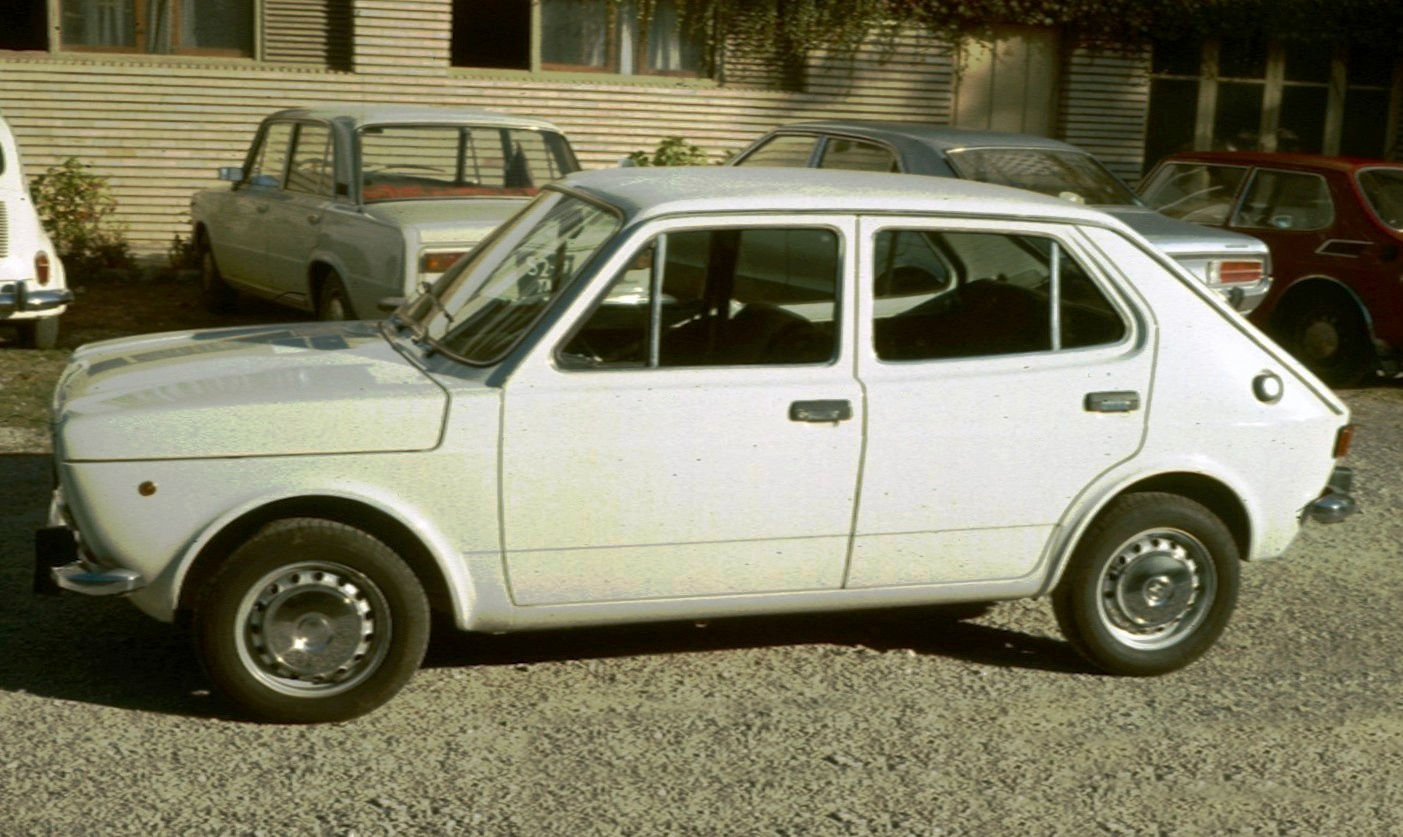
SEAT 127 4-door

As happened with other Fiat models of that era, SEAT made a Spanish version of this car called the SEAT 127. Due to SEAT's design policy, a four-door variant of the car was also produced, as well as a later five-door version. The second series' change to the side profile was also applied to these four-door versions, with a flatter and more angular rear side window line. SEAT also produced a unique variant of the 127 OHV engine: this version had 1010 cc instead of 903 cc and produced 50 PS (37 kW; 49 bhp). The four-door SEAT 127 was exported to certain markets with Fiat badging.

When their licence from Fiat expired, SEAT redesigned some parts of the car and created the SEAT Fura Dos. Some design parts of this model were also used in the Ibiza mark 1. SEAT produced 1,238,166 units of the 127 between 1972 and 1984.

=== Polski Fiat 127p ===
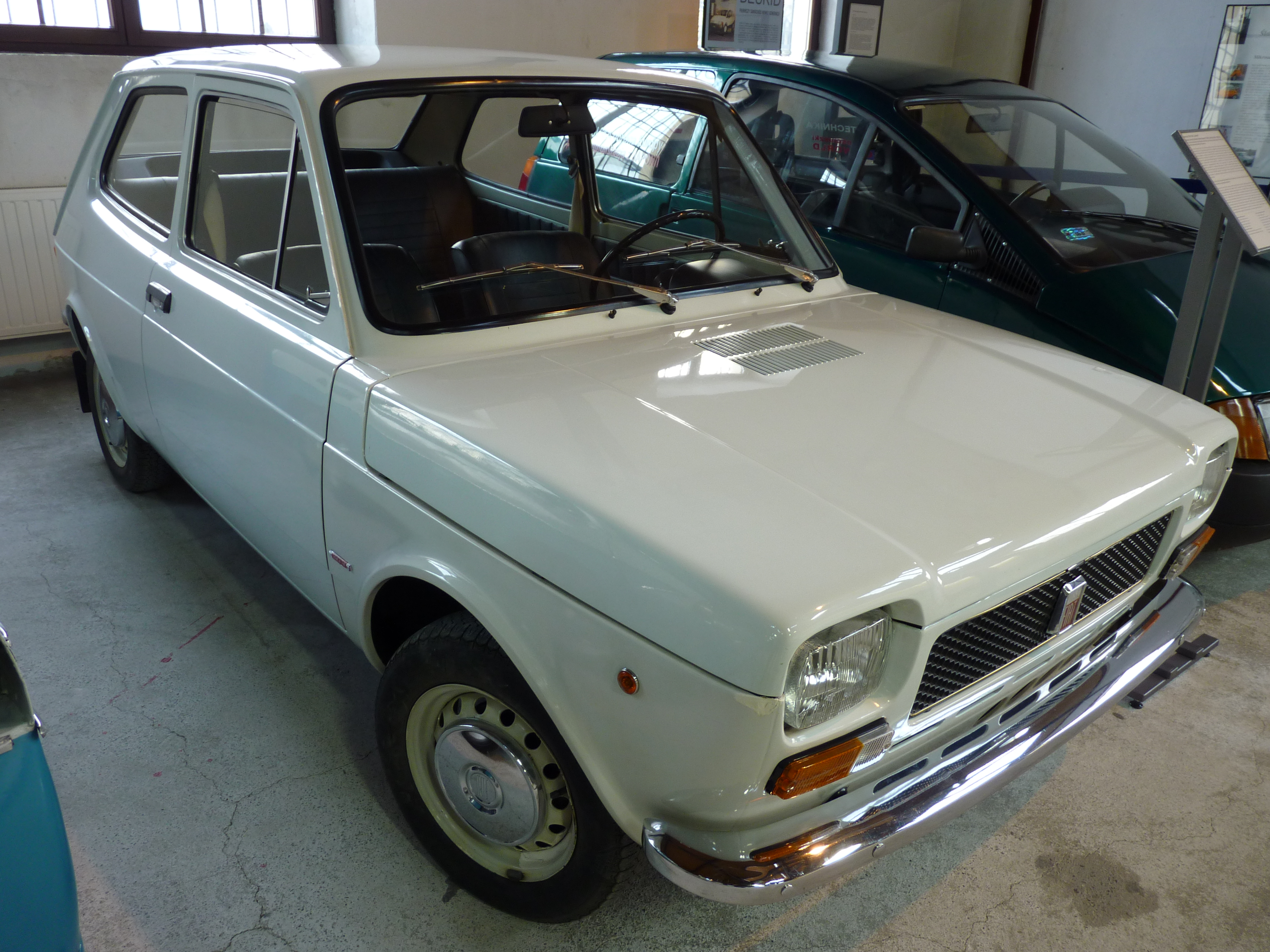
Polski Fiat 127p at Muzeum Inżynierii Miejskiej in Kraków.

Fiat 127 was also produced under Fiat license by Polish automobile manufacturers FSO (between 1973 and 1975) and FSM (between 1974 and 1975) under the name Polski Fiat 127p. These were assembled using some Polish, but mostly Italian parts (which would have to be paid in expensive foreign currency). Originally the Polski Fiat 127p was to be produced in large numbers as a people's car, but when it became apparent that it would be about 30% more expensive than the 126p it was decided to concentrate on the latter while the larger 127p was only produced in very small numbers. It was tried to increase the Polish content by using the two-stroke 3-cylinder engine of the Syrena 105, but it didn't fit properly and it would have meant a step backwards in quality, comfort and modern technology.

=== Fiat 147 ===
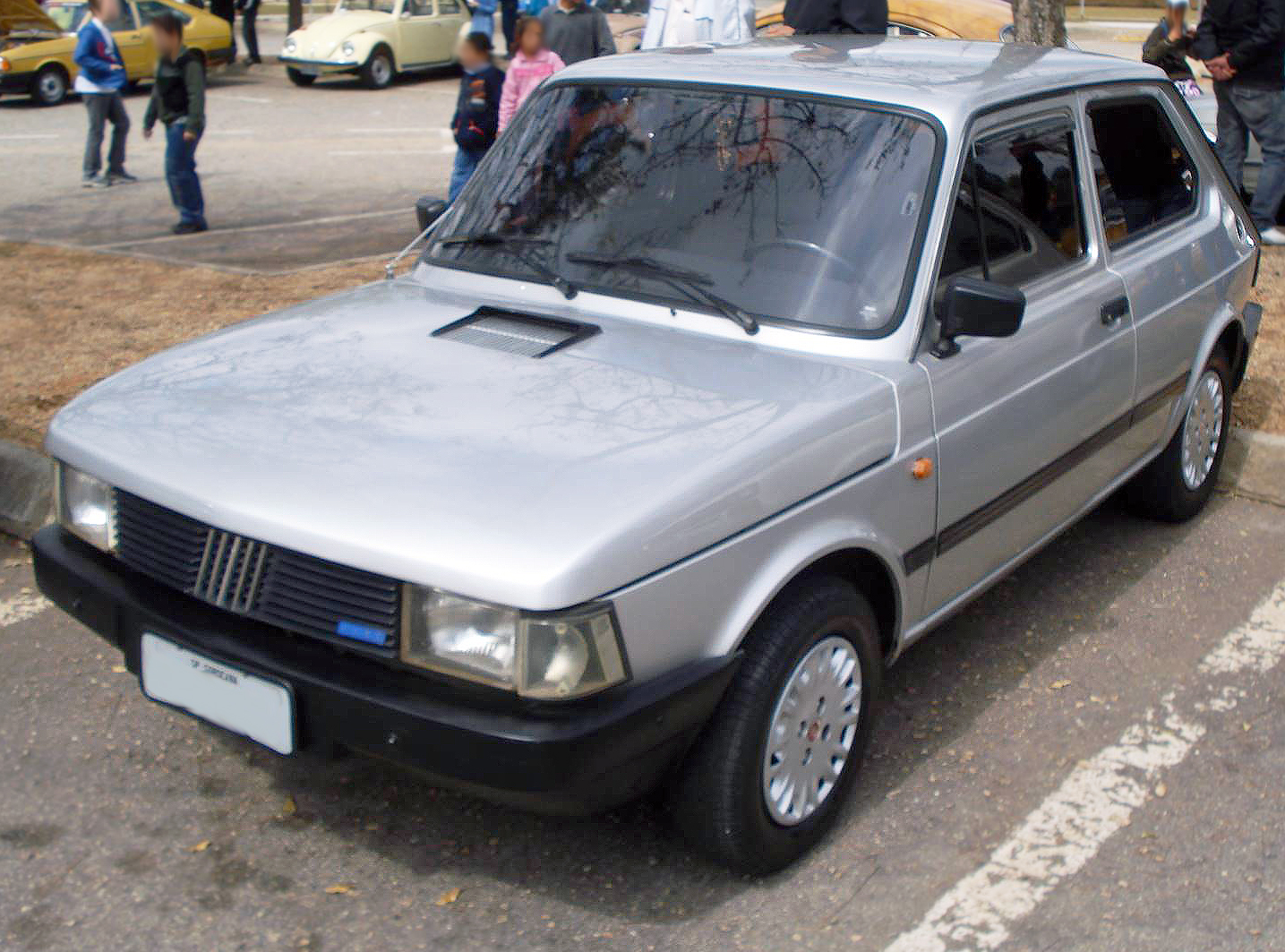
Fiat 147

In Brazil the car was known as the Fiat 147 (later Spazio), a three-door station wagon version called "Panorama". There was also a conventional two-door three-box saloon available, "Fiat Oggi", a pick-up called "City" and a van called "Fiorino" was also produced there. The Brazilian-built versions utilized a 1050 cc engine and a 1300 cc engine called "Fiasa" and also utilized a 1.3 L Diesel engine (for export markets only). From 1981 this variant (called a 127) was exported to Europe, to be sold alongside the 127 sedans and hatchbacks. A total of 1,169,312 units were built from 9 July 1976 to the end of 1986 in Brazil and 232,807 units were also built in Argentina between 1982 and 1996, as the Fiat 147, Spazio, and Vivace. It was also assembled in the CCA in Colombia.

Although the car achieved reasonable selling figures, the model was titled as "low-level" and "not so reliable" by early buyers, because Fiat was just starting to sell cars in Brazil in the late 1970s and early 1980s. It was the first model produced by FIAT in Brazil, in 1976.

=== VAZ-1101 ===
The Soviet manufacturer VAZ expanded its existing collaboration with Fiat in the early 1970s to develop a 127-derived supermini which would have slotted below the existing Fiat 124-based Zhiguli sedan. The car, designated VAZ-1101 however never made production, but formed the basis of the later Lada Niva (VAZ-2121) off-roader, which as a result, retained key styling features of the Fiat 127 — most notably the distinctive forward-opening 'clamshell' hood; with the stepped beltline and glasshouse also bearing a strong resemblance to the 127.

== Specials ==
Italian coachbuilder Moretti made a canvas-topped version in the style of the Renault Rodeo and Citroën Méhari called the "Midimaxi" (to set it apart from the smaller, 126-based Minimaxi). In spite of its rugged appearance, the front-wheel drive underpinnings remained the same. The Midimaxi was first shown at the 1971 Turin Motor Show, which was also when the very similar Fissore 127 Scout first appeared.The Scout 127 was also produced in Greece by Autokinitoviomihania Ellados, which further developed the model into the 127 Amico version, producing a total of just over 6,000 units.

Another special was a station wagon derivative (127 Familiare) developed by small Turinese coachbuilders Coriasco, first shown in 1971. Coriasco also developed a panel van derivative. In 1978, Coriasco presented a high-roofed leisure vehicle version, akin to the Talbot Matra Rancho, called the Coriasco 127 Farm. Coriasco displayed two 127 Coupés but these never entered production.

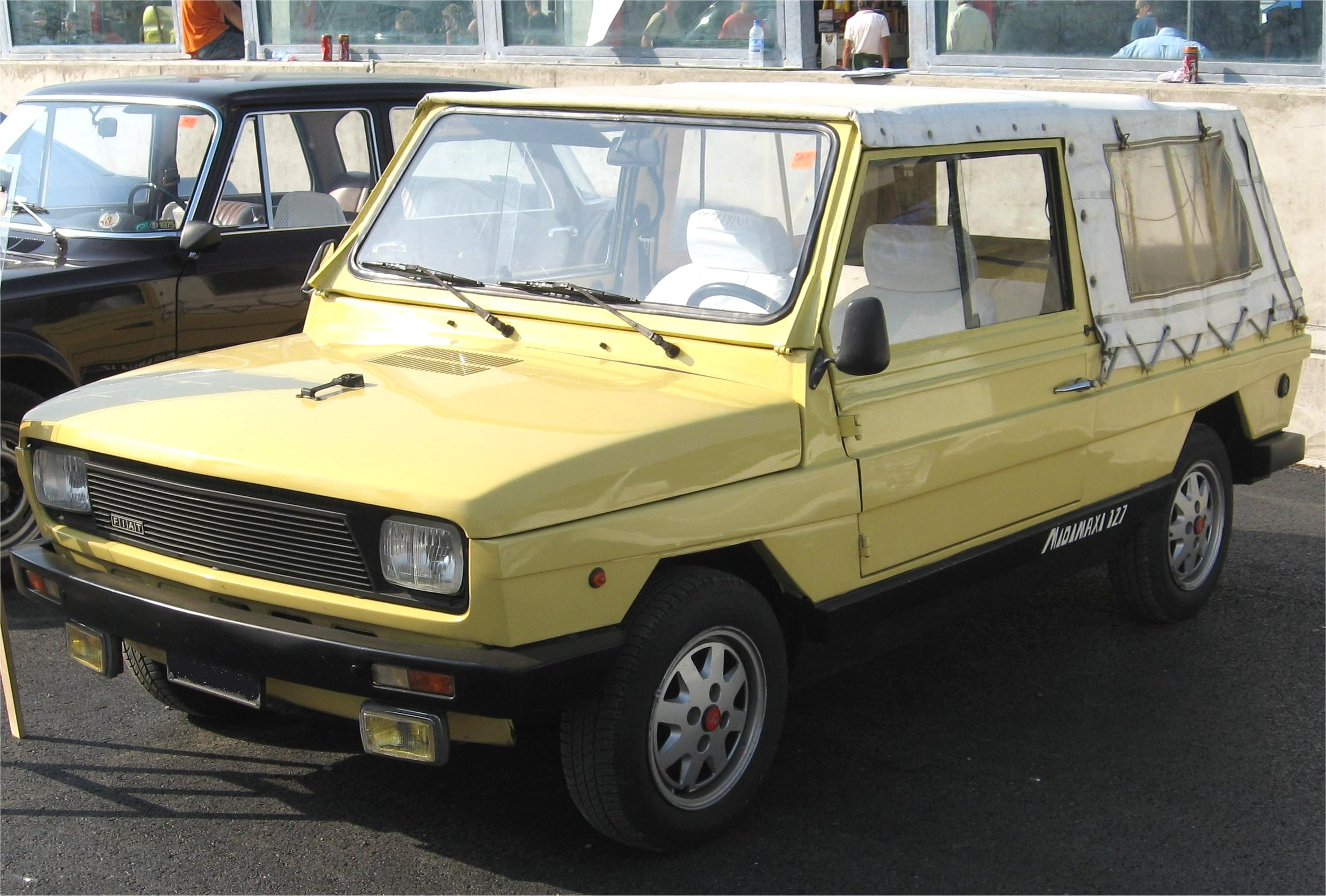
1980 Moretti Midimaxi (2nd series)

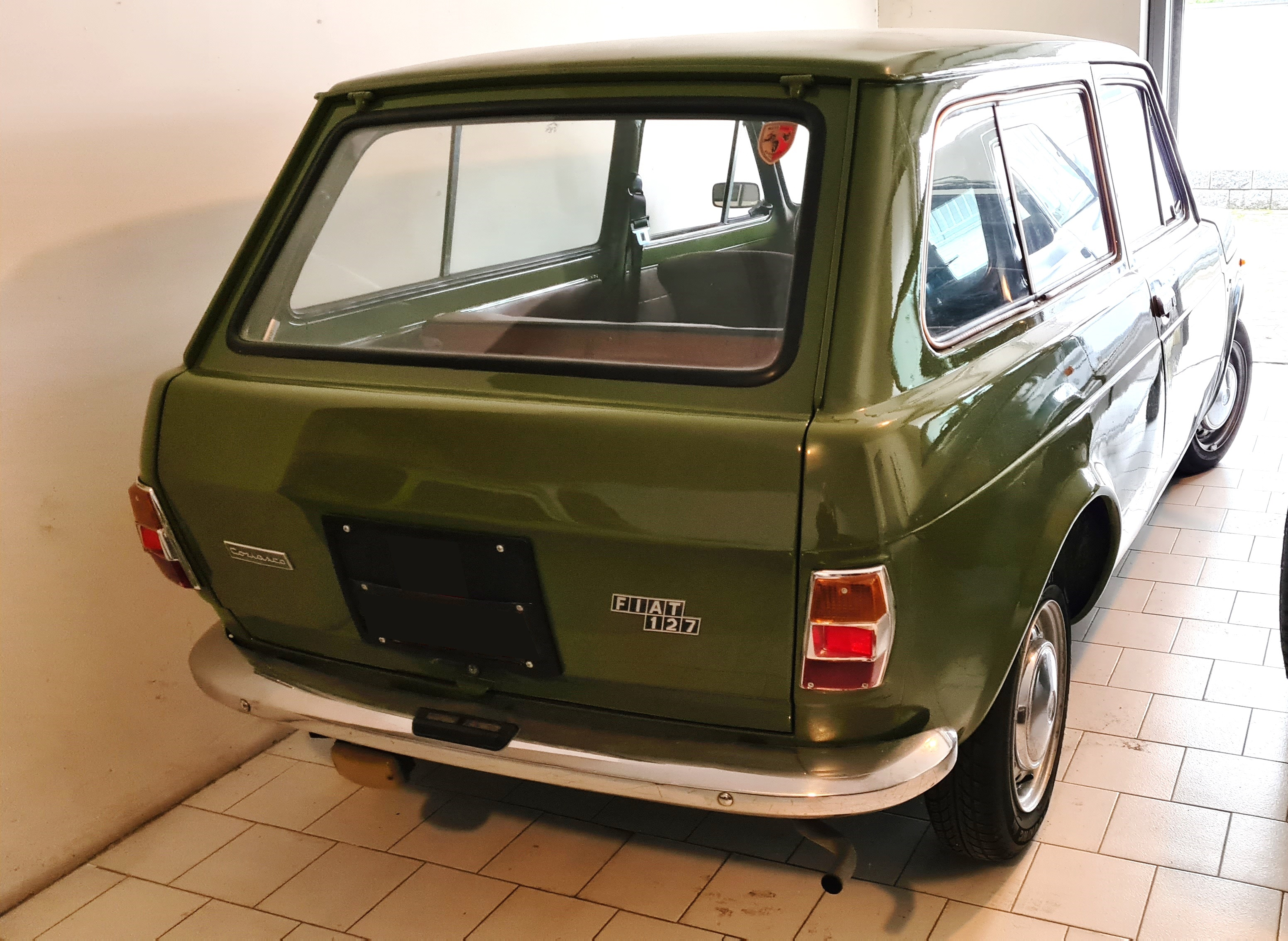
Fiat 127 Coriasco Familiare, rear
