= Cadillac Debutante =

1950 concept car

The Cadillac Debutante was exhibited at the Chicago Auto Show as a concept car in 1950. The interior was upholstered in leopard skin and had 24-karat gold instrument panels and fittings. At $35,000, it was claimed to be Cadillac's most luxurious car ever at the time. However, it never reached the production line, making it a one-off.
