= Ford SYNus =

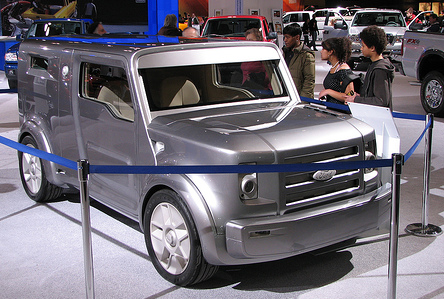

Overview
- Manufacturer: Ford
- Production: 2005
- Designer: Jose Paris; Joe Baker

Body and chassis
- Class: Concept car
- Body style: 3-door wagon

Powertrain
- Engine: 2.0L Duratorq I4 (diesel)
- Transmission: 5-speed manual

The Ford SYNus was a concept car produced by Ford and created by the Spanish designer Jose Paris (exterior design) and Joe Baker (interior). The SYNus debuted at the 2005 North American International Auto Show.

The unusual name, which is pronounced "sin-you-ehs", comes from the words synthesis (synthesis of the tough exterior and the soft interior) and US, which stands for Urban Sanctuary. Its name is a homophone of sinuous, which means curving, or graceful.

== Design ==
The design mimics that of an armadillo, in that it had a tough exterior and a soft interior. Armadillo was a working title of the SYNus, but was discarded when it was discovered that there was another concept car from Fiat with this title. Other production names have included "Ford Knox" and "Gorilla".

The SYNus shared its powertrain design with the Ford Mondeo. The engine was a diesel powered, 16 valve, turbocharged, 2.0L DOHC 4-cylinder Duratorq TDCi Diesel engine that produced 134 horsepower (100 kW). The SYNus had a five-speed manual transmission. Its wheels were 18 inches (457 mm) in diameter. It had an IEEE 802.11g compliant wireless LAN hub. The SYNus was designed to maximize safety, and derived its aesthetic from modern bank vaults. The car's windows and frame were bullet-resistant. It had no rear window, and instead displayed a video feed on a large LCD monitor installed in the back of the car's interior. Also, when in "lockdown mode" steel shutters closed around the front windshield, windows and the exterior lights.

The car also, as mentioned earlier, was an "Urban Sanctuary". When in "lockdown mode", the car's seats could be configured to face rearwards, to watch movies or relax in otherwise hectic city life. In this sense, the car could be used to shut out the outside world.
