= Pio Manzù =

Italian automotive and industrial designer

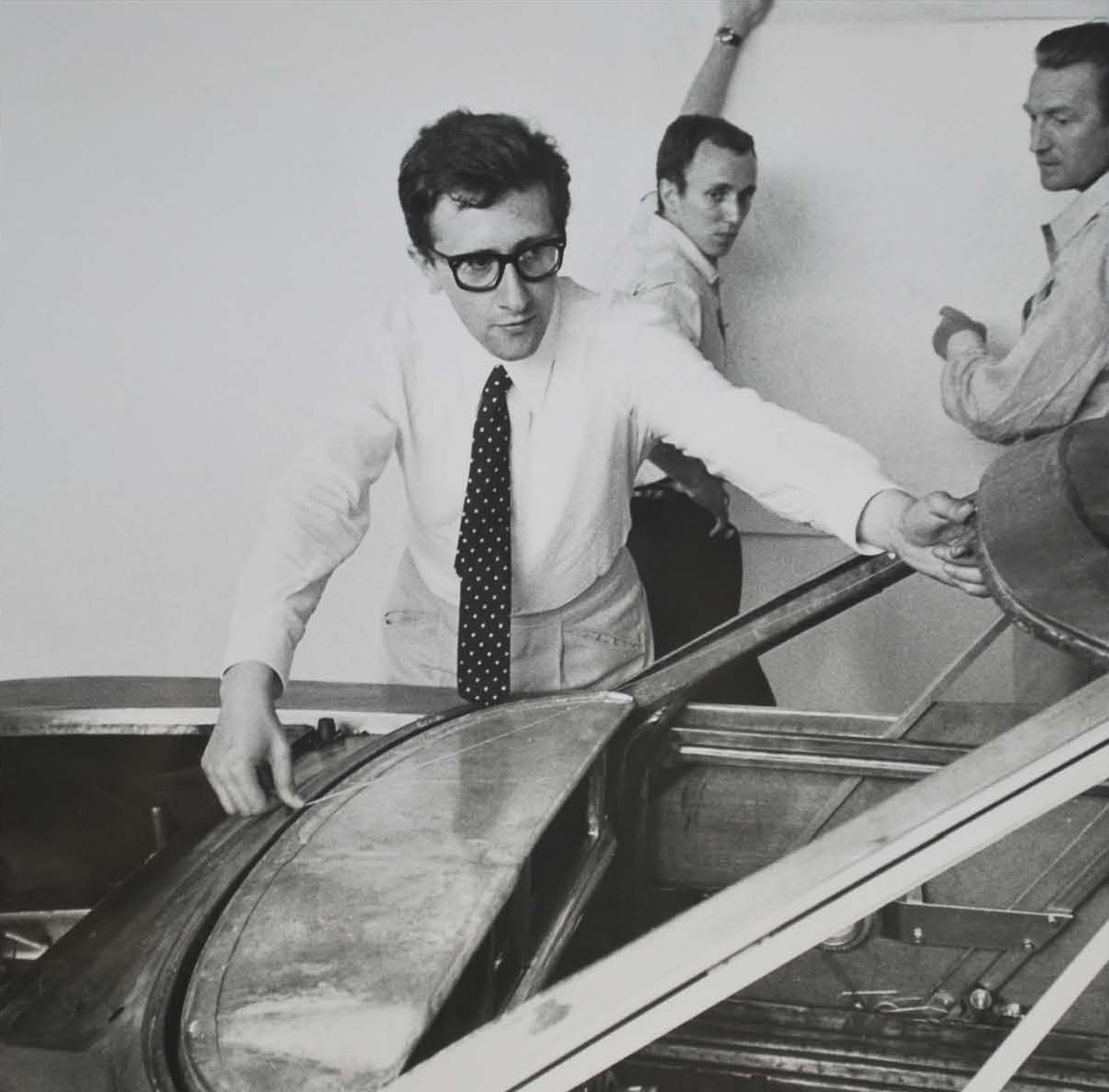
- Pio Manzù around 1964 working on the NSU Autonova GT concept
- Born: Pio Manzoni; 2 March 1939; Milan, Italy
- Died: 26 May 1969 (aged 30); Brandizzo, Italy
- Burial place: Cimitero monumentale di Bergamo; 45.69861654069445°N 9.690904101166039°E
- Education: Ulm School of Design
- Occupation: Industrial designer
- Years active: 1964–1969
- Employer: Fiat
- Notable work: Fiat 127, Cronotime clock, Parentesi lamp
- Spouse: Eleonora Liebi
- Children: 2
- Father: Giacomo Manzù
- Awards: Compasso d'Oro (posthumously)

Pio Manzoni (2 March 1939 – 26 May 1969), was an Italian automotive, product, and furniture designer who worked under the name Pio Manzù. One of his best known designs is that of the Fiat 127.

== Education ==
A son of sculptor Giacomo Manzù and his first wife Antonia Oreni, Pio Manzù studied product design at the Ulm School of Design (German: Hochschule für Gestaltung Ulm), in Germany, under the guidance of Argentine designer and philosopher Tomás Maldonado. After his graduation in 1964 as the first Italian at this institution, he continued as a teaching assistant at the Ulm school. In 1962 he entered an international competition of the Swiss magazine Année Automobile, which he won with a design for an Austin Healey 3000. The prize was that the design would be executed by Carrozzeria Pininfarina, who displayed it at motorshows in Turin and London.

== Work ==
=== Autonova ===
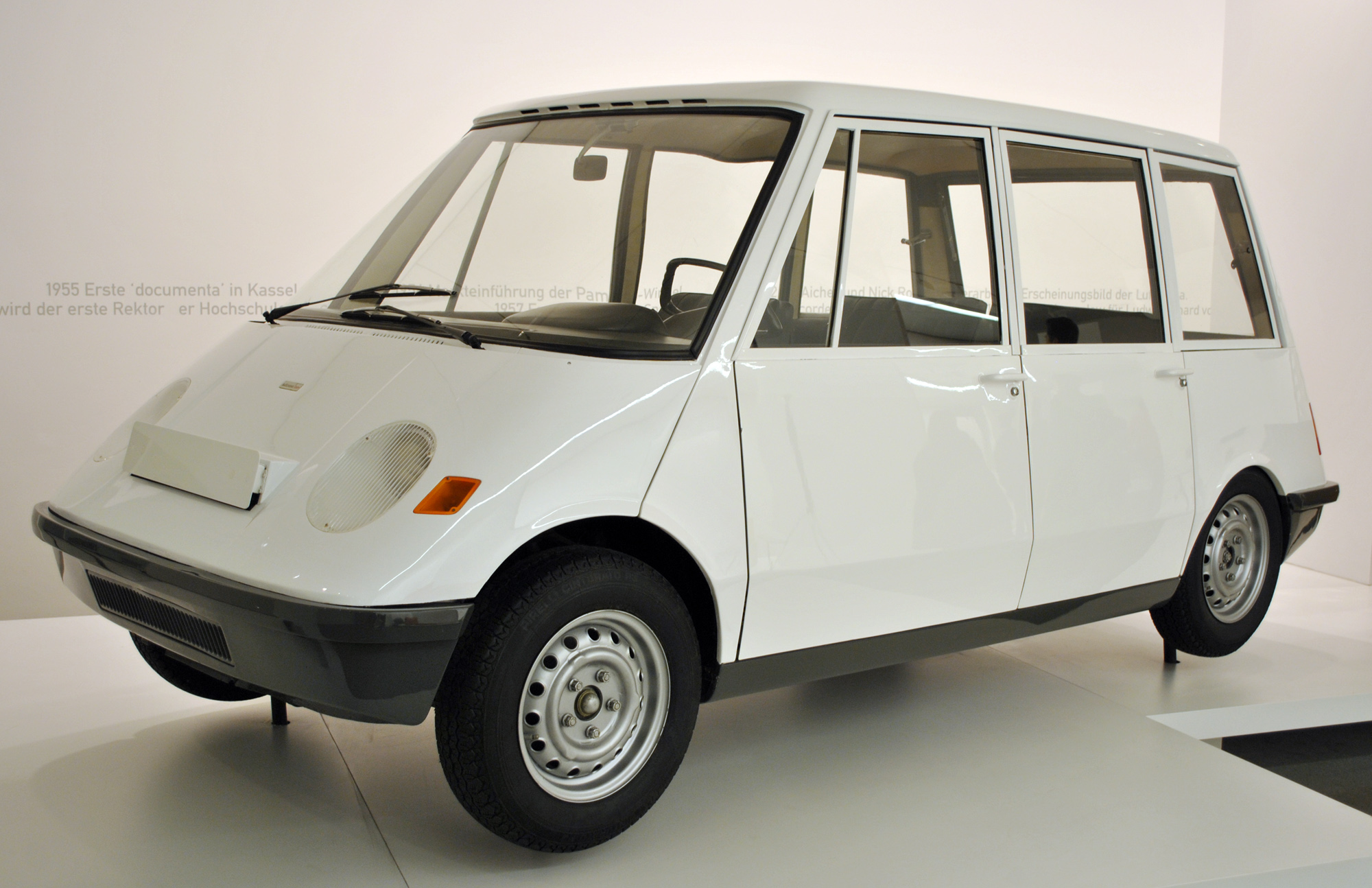
Autonova Fam, designed by Busch, Conrad and Manzù (1965)

Manzù realised a number of projects for interior decoration and started collaborating with several international publications, writing articles and making designs in the automotive field.

In 1965, together with automotive writer Fritz Bob Busch and fellow-Ulm-graduate Michael Conrad, Manzù set up the project group Autonova. They developed prototypes like the Autonova GT, based on the NSU Prinz and NSU Ro 80, and the Glas 1004-based Autonova Fam, a mini MPV before the category existed. The prototypes were realized by Turinese coachbuilders Sibona-Basano. The Autonova Fam immediately caught the attention of engineer Dante Giacosa, head of the Fiat development department and styling center, but also the management of companies like NSU, Glas, Pirelli, Recaro, VDO and BASF had an eye on these concept cars.

=== Furniture and more ===
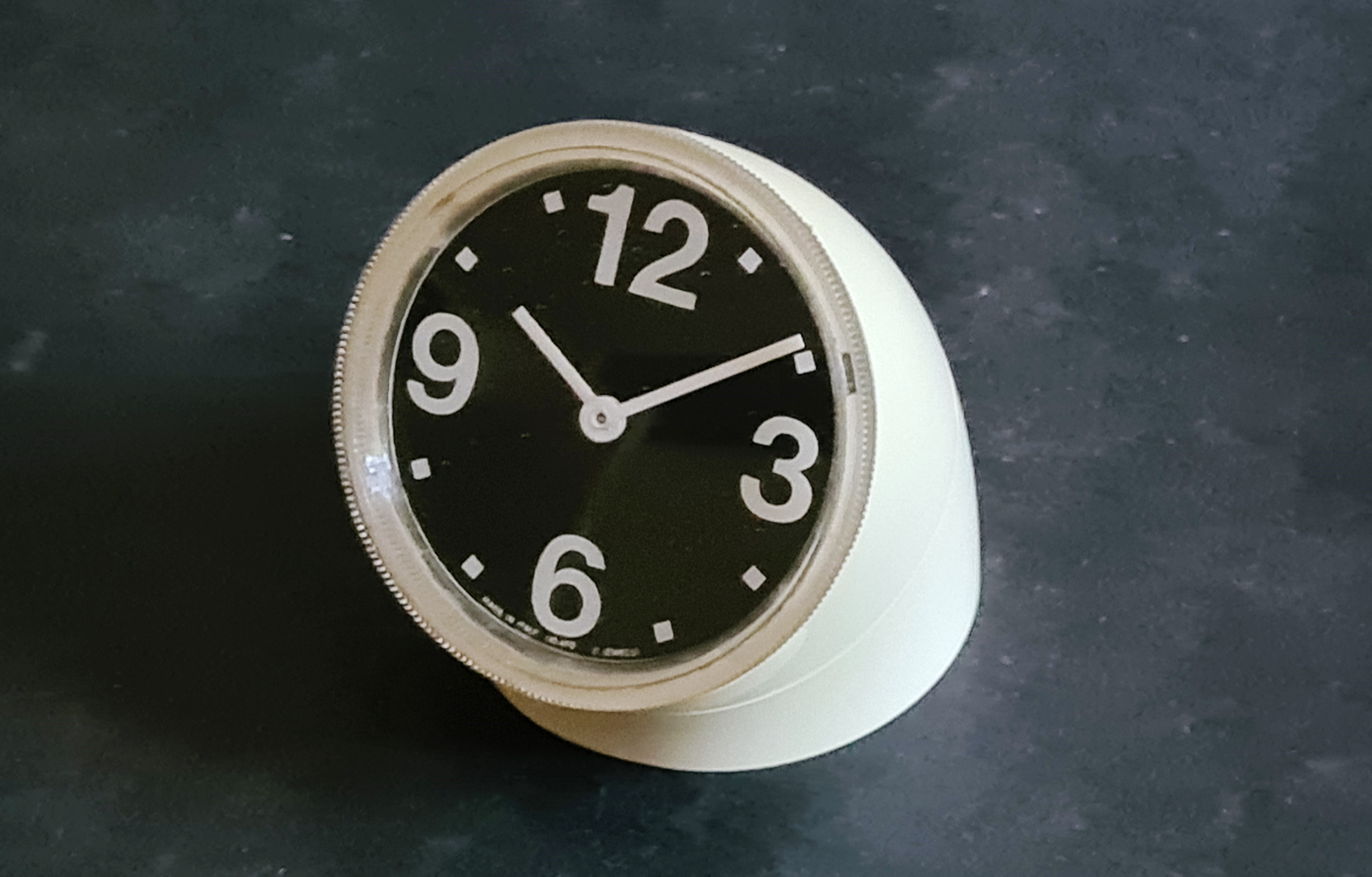
Ritz-Italora Cronotime (1966)

Other designs that carry the signature of the designer from Lombardy were in the field of home accessories. An example is the Cronotime table clock, that resembles the exhaust pipes or cooling water hoses of a car engine, and was originally made in 1966 as a giveaway for Fiat customer relations. It then became a Ritz-Italora product that was available in La Rinascente department store and has been included in the MoMA collection. Later it was added to the Alessi catalogue, in which it currently still is. Other product designs were writing and desktop materials for Kartell, and an automobile inspired lounge chair and a one-legged table for Alias.

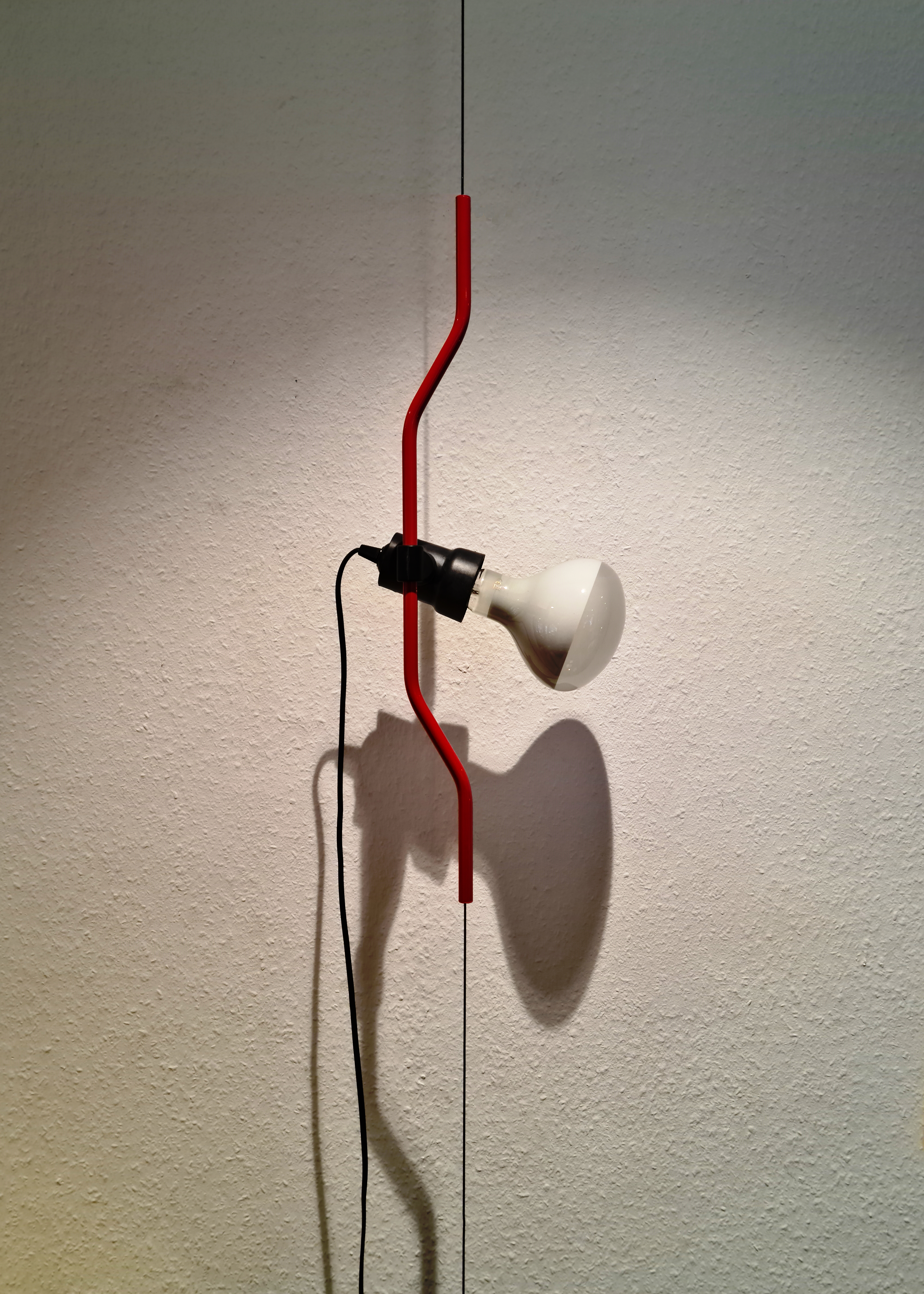
Flos Parentesi lamp by Achille Castiglioni (developed posthumously from a Manzu concept sketch)

The Parentesi lamp for the lighting manufacturer FLOS (over 800,000 sold) was developed by Achille Castiglioni in the early 1970s, based on a sketch made earlier by Manzù; the lamp is in the MoMA collection as well and was awarded the Compasso d'Oro in 1979.

Manzù also worked as a consultant for Piaggio and Olivetti. The collaboration with these companies lead to the realisation of the two Autonova prototypes.

In 1969, Manzù was the only non-French jury member for the selection of the Bolide Design exhibition organised by the Musée des Arts Décoratifs in Paris.

=== Fiat projects ===
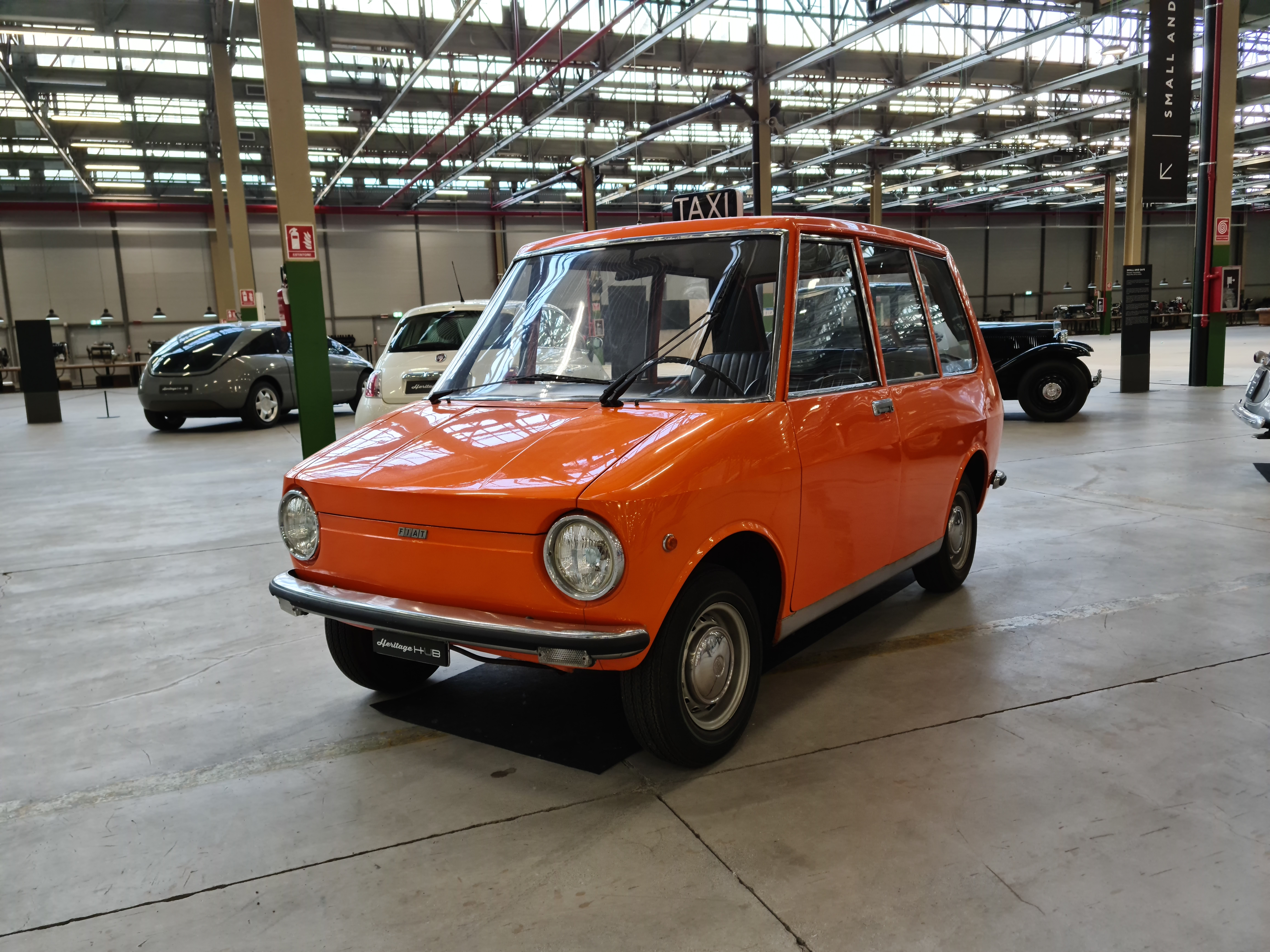
Fiat City Taxi concept car (1968)

At Fiat Styling Center, Dante Giacosa at first was hesitant about the newly hired consultant Manzù's ability to fit in with the strict procedures of industrialisation of a product design. In 1968, his first project, however, led to the execution of a concept car for use as a taxi, mechanically based on the Fiat 850 with cutting-edge technical and styling solutions that Manzù had already developed at Autonova. The result, the Fiat City Taxi, was sort of a monospace avant-la-lettre and, while it didn't go into production, stylistically it formed the basis of what a few years later would become the successor to the Fiat 500, the 126.

Another project in 1968 was the Autobianchi sports coupé G.31, which had already been started by OSI a few years before. Manzù had to bring it back to life, and did so very much to the satisfaction of Giacosa as well as the public, whose response during the Turin Auto Show was very positive. Nevertheless, it was decided that the car would not see production.

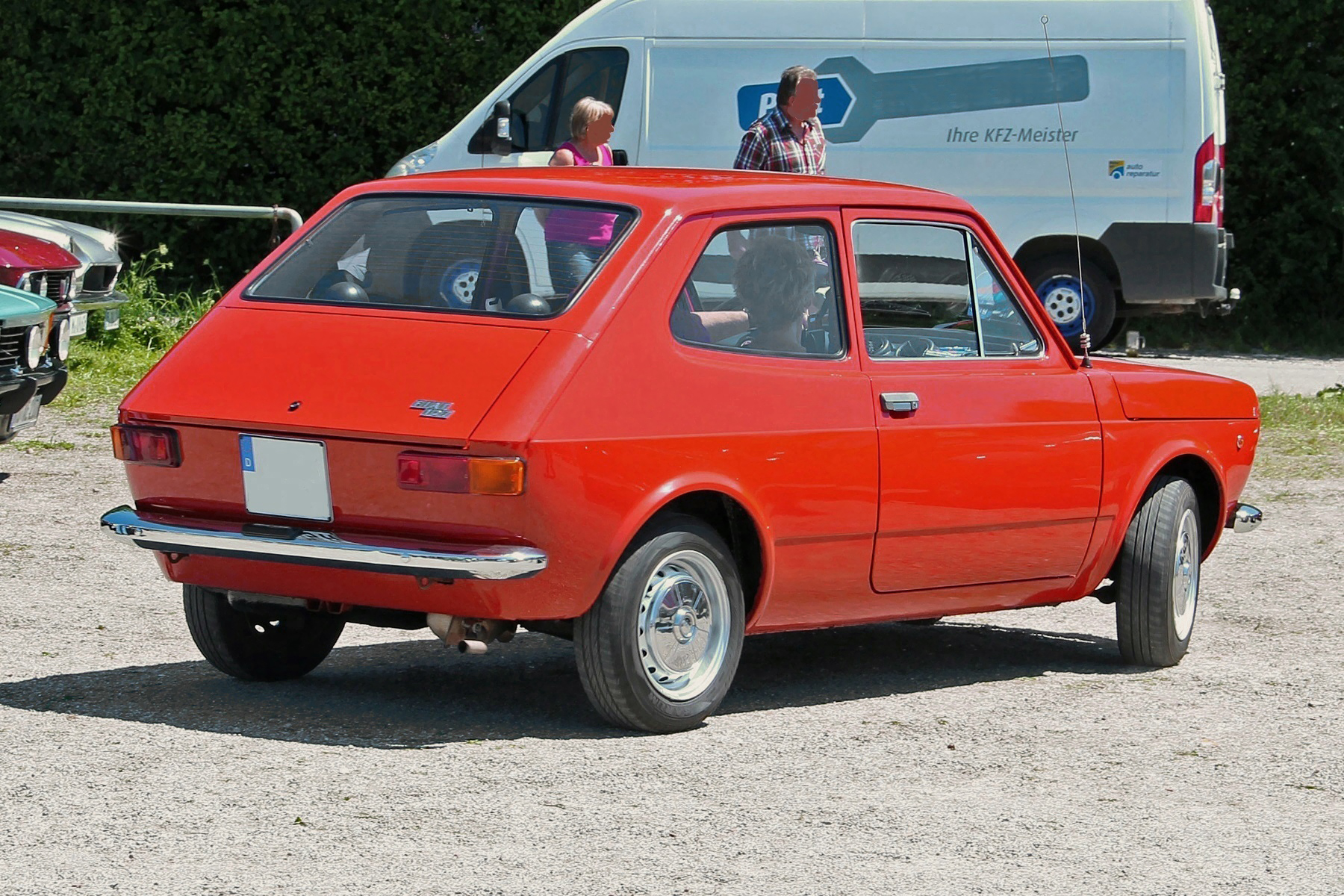
Fiat 127 (1971)

Manzù's work convinced Giacosa to entrust him, in the same year, with the styling of the Fiat 127, a new car that was to become a revolutionary concept for the people's car and a reference for the global car production in the 1970s. Almost 8 million would be built in two decades.

== Death ==
Pio Manzù never saw the result of his French museum judging job, his conceptual idea for the Parentesi lamp or his important project at the Fiat Styling Center. In fact, he was on his way to the presentation of the final Fiat 127 mock-up to the top management, in May 1969, when he had a one-sided car accident on the A4 autostrada Milan-Turin, near the toll booths of the Brandizzo exit, just 10 km before reaching Turin. Having come home late the night before, and having left early to get to the 8.00 a.m. presentation in time, Manzù had chosen to drive his wife's Fiat 500 instead of his own Fiat Dino. For an unknown reason, his car had rolled over. Manzù died in the ambulance before it reached the hospital.

== Other recognition ==
- Apart from the items in the MoMA collection, parts of Manzù's work are also in the collections of Galleria d'Arte Moderna e Contemporanea in Bergamo, which staged a retrospective exhibition of the designer's work in 2008, and in the Pinakothek der Moderne in Munich.
- In 1969, the UN founded Pio Manzù International Research Centre in Rimini, Italy, in order to facilitate studies of economic and scientific aspects of the relationship between man and his environment. It closed in 2016.
- Fondazione Manzù has been established in order to support high-profile initiatives, projects and events to encourage studies and research in the field of design, technology of materials, production processes, means and infrastructures for mobility, and environment.
- There is a secondary school ("Liceo Artistico Giacomo e Pio Manzù") and a street ("Via Pio Manzù") named in his honour in Bergamo.
- In 2021, the Museo Nazionale dell’Automobile in Turin staged an exhibition titled Che Macchina! 1971–2021 Pio Manzù e i cinquant'anni della 127 'What a Car! 1971–2021 Pio Manzù and the fiftieth anniversary of the 127'.

== Publications ==
- Finessi, Giuseppe; Fagone, Enrico (2008). Pio Manzù: Quando il mondo era moderno [Pio Manzù: When the world was modern] (in Italian and English). Milan: Electa. p. 172. ISBN 978-8837066918.
- Alfarano, Giampiero; Guglielmi, Eugenio (2019). Pio Manzù: Designer di Transizione tra Moderno e Contemporaneo (in Italian). Macchione. ISBN 978-8865705698.
