= Fiat City Taxi =

1968 concept vehicle from Italy

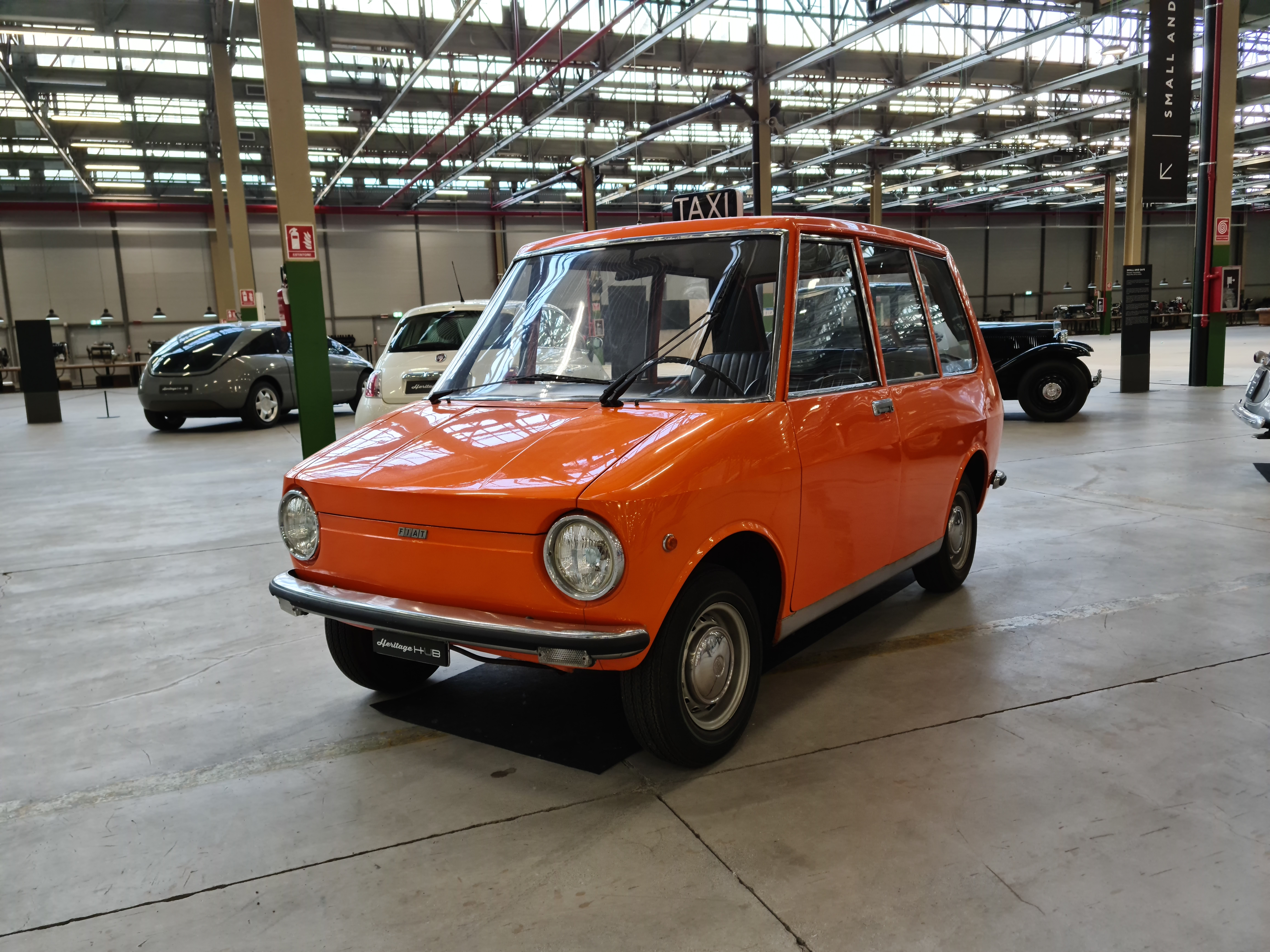
- The Fiat City Taxi Prototype in FCA's Heritage HUB in Turin, Italy

Overview
- Type: Modified Sedan
- Manufacturer: Fiat
- Production: 1968
- Designer: Pio Manzu

Body and chassis
- Layout: Rear-mounted, rear-wheel drive
- Platform: Fiat 850
- Doors: 2 (One traditional and one sliding)

Powertrain
- Engine: 843cc Inline Four (Gasoline)
- Power output: 34 bhp

Dimensions
- Length: 3250 mm
- Width: 1450 mm
- Height: 1600 mm

The Fiat City Taxi is a concept car produced by Fiat for the 1968 Turin Auto Show. The car's design was a heavy modification of the mass-produced Fiat 850. Its design was led by Pio Manzu in collaboration with Fiat's internal design center.

== History ==
The creation of the Fiat City Taxi was originally spurred by Dante Giacosa, a longtime Fiat designer who was behind the Fiat 600 Multipla. His goal was to design a car purely for commercial use, making no concessions for private drivers. This car was primarily to be driven in cities where roads were very cramped, so a main design constraint was to keep the car small and maneuverable while also maintaining a comfortable passenger compartment. To spearhead this project, Giacosa picked Pio Manzu. Fiat filed 15 patents along with the creation of this prototype, alluding to its ingenuity.

== Passenger comfort ==
To accentuate passenger comfort, many novel design choices were made, most notably an asymmetric sliding door on one side of the vehicle. It is reminiscent of a minivan's sliding door today, giving ease of entry and exit on one side. The passenger compartment itself was made more spacious with a high roof, and the back bench seat could sit three across. There was a fourth passenger jump seat available next to the driver that could be folded down to increase storage space.

== Mechanics ==
With the goal of this car being for short city trips, maneuverability and driving ease were two important considerations. The car featured a semi-automatic gearbox which eliminated the need for a clutch pedal. This was done with a hydraulic torque converter, as was done on the Fiat 850 Special Idroconvert. The dashboard included an integrated taxi meter, as well as a small radio receiver, a microphone built into the sun visor, and a small television. The City Taxi was equipped with novel safety features as well, such as an articulated steering column to lower danger in head-on collisions, and the use of padded material in the dashboard.

== Reception and influence ==
No production run of this car was ever undertaken, and it was shown only once at the 1968 Turin Auto Show. Many of the safety features first demonstrated on this model are now standard across many production cars.

The single prototype that was produced is currently held in the "Small and Safe" section of FCA's Heritage HUB in Turin.
