= Autobianchi A111 =

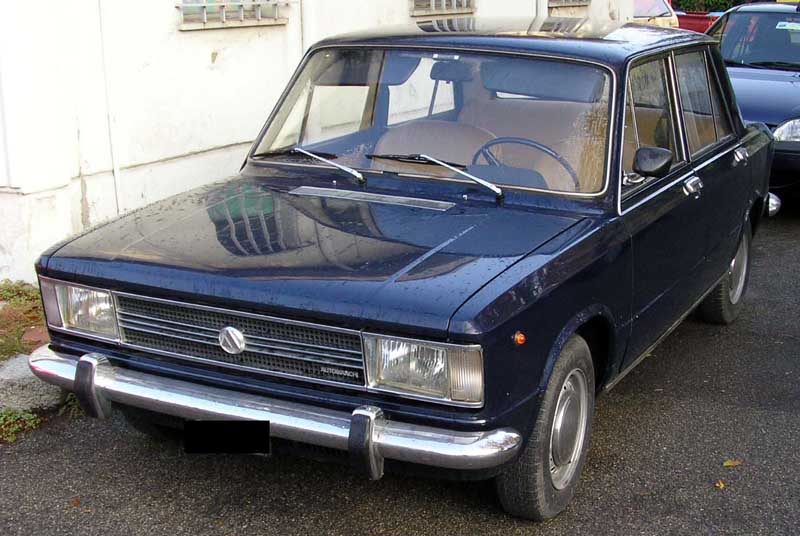
- Autobianchi A111 (series 1)

Overview
- Manufacturer: Autobianchi
- Production: 1969–1972
- Assembly: Italy: Desio, Milan
- Designer: Dante Giacosa

Body and chassis
- Class: Family car
- Body style: 4-door saloon
- Layout: Transverse front-engine, front-wheel-drive
- Related: Autobianchi Primula

Powertrain
- Engine: 1.4 L Fiat 124 BLC I4
- Transmission: 4-speed manual

Dimensions
- Wheelbase: 2,363 mm (93.0 in)
- Length: 4,020 mm (158.3 in)
- Width: 1,610 mm (63.4 in)
- Height: 1,400 mm (55.1 in)
- Kerb weight: 930 kg (2,050 lb)

Chronology
- Predecessor: Autobianchi Primula

The Autobianchi A111 is a 4-door saloon family car produced from 1969 to 1972 by Italian car manufacturer Autobianchi, a subsidiary of the Fiat group. Despite rather modest dimensions, at roughly 4 metres long, it was the largest Autobianchi ever made, as the brand specialized in small cars. A modern front-wheel drive construction like the Fiat 128 launched concurrently, it was based on the revolutionary Autobianchi Primula, Fiat's first "experiment" with the transverse engine front-wheel-drive setup.

== History ==
=== Development ===
In 1957 Autobianchi produced the Bianchina, an upmarket version of the Fiat 500, and the Primula small family car. Offered both as a fastback saloon and hatchback, the 1964 Primula was Fiat's first front-wheel drive production car. It had pioneered the transverse-engined front-wheel drive layout with the transmission and clutch to the left of the engine, which today is almost universally used on front-wheel drive cars. The brainchild of Dante Giacosa (Note: At the head of Fiat's technical office, Giacosa had been experimentation with transverse-engined front-drive cars since the 1940s.) this mechanical layout had been developed for the Fiat 123, an experimental project undertaken to test various unconventional engine and transmission layouts for a mid-sized 1100 replacement; when Fiat's management endorsed the traditionally laid out (front-longitudinal engine, rear-wheel drive) 124 instead, it had spawned the innovative Autobianchi Primula.

To replace the Primula the managing director of Autobianchi, Enrico Ghiretti, desired a new three-box saloon. According to Giacosa's memoirs, Ghiretti feared competition from the upcoming front-wheel drive Fiat 128 small family car (at the time still known as project X1/1) and was a proponent of conservative three-box styling, as opposed to than the Primula's current 2-box hatchback or fastback bodies. The project was authorized by Fiat management, but since Fiat's style centre was already overworked, decision was taken to use a design for the dismissed project 123. The chosen design was the most recent proposal for the transverse-engined front-wheel drive 123 E4; it was updated, chiefly in the front end to incorporate new rectangular headlamp lenses, and approved by Ghiretti for production. Therefore, on the outside the A111's lines unsurprisingly recalled coeval Fiat designs, especially the 124 and 128. Christened A111, the new car—albeit larger in size—was based on the Primula's platform and mechanicals, and used the 1.4-litre drivetrain of the most powerful Primula, the Coupé S of 1968. Size-wise, the A111 slotted between Fiat's 128 and 124 sedans, being also significantly bigger than the previously biggest Autobianchi, the said Primula.

=== Launch, updates and demise ===
The Autobianchi A111 was introduced in April 1969, and deliveries began in May. The interior, seating four or five, was rather well-appointed, with a genuine wood fascia on the dashboard, individual sliding and reclining front seats, fully carpeted floor, and cloth, cloth-and-leatherette or full leatherette upholstery. Autobianchi advertised a top speed of 155 km/h (96 mph).

A lightly revised A111 was introduced at the 52nd Turin Motor Show in October/November 1970. A distinguishing feature of these "series 2" cars were double-stacked tail lamps, using two the same design seen on the initial model. New bumpers gained rubbing strips but dispensed with the over-riders (bringing overall length to less than four metres), there was new model badging on the tail, and the interior was partly redesigned, including a new centre console and a shorter gear shifter.

As the 1970s progressed, Fiat has introduced an increasing number of FWD cars under its own brand, and thus the Autobianchis became redundant. The last A111 left the production line in 1972, making the total number produced 56,984. The A111 remained without a direct replacement within the Autobianchi range, and thus the brand was reduced to a single model—the A112 upmarket supermini and its successor the Y10, the last car to bear the Autobianchi badge.

=== Competition ===
The A111 did not see much competition and there was no factory effort, but some privateers chose to rally the car. One was entered in the 1970 Monte Carlo Rally, where Federico Confalioneri and co-driver Adolfo Pasta retired.

== Specifications ==
The Autobianchi A111 was a unibody front-wheel drive 4-door sedan with a transversely mounted engine. The Fiat type 124 BLC.000 1.4-litre overhead valve four-cylinder unit was the same installed on the Fiat 124 Special and on the Autobianchi Primula Coupé S; (Note: This engine should not be confused with a more powerful engine of the same displacement from the Fiat Twin Cam series, which was installed in the 124 Special T, but not in the A111.) The four-cylinder had a displacement of 1,438 cubic centimetres, a bore and stroke of 81 and 71.5 mm, and a compression ratio of 9.3:1. Fed by a twin-choke downdraught Weber 32 DFB carburettor, it produced 70 PS DIN (51 kW; 69 hp) – 75 PS SAE – at 5,400 rpm, and 108 N⋅m DIN (80 lb⋅ft) at 3,000 rpm. The engine was mated to an all-synchromesh 4-speed manual transmission with floor-mounted shifter. Neither an automatic or different engine options were offered.

Suspension was as on the Primula. At the front it consisted of A-arms and an upper transverse leaf spring, which doubled both as upper link and an anti-roll bar, as well as providing the attachment point for double-acting hydraulic dampers; at the rear there was a beam axle on longitudinal semi-elliptic leaf springs, plus double-acting hydraulic dampers.

Steering was by means of a rack-and-pinion mechanism positioned beneath the transverse leaf spring and behind the engine. The braking system comprised four disk brakes, front-rear split hydraulic circuits, a vacuum servo and proportioning valve on the rear axle.
