= A112 =

A112 may refer to:

- Autobianchi A112 (also known as the Lancia A112), a car
- A112 road (Great Britain)
