= Autobianchi =

Italian automobile manufacturer

- Industry: Automotive
- Founded: 11 January 1955
- Defunct: 1995; 31 years ago
- Fate: Merged into Lancia
- Successor: Lancia
- Headquarters: Desio, Italy
- Products: Automobiles
- Revenue: U$1.7 billion dollars (1967)
- Number of employees: 4,500 (1967)
- Parent: Fiat S.p.A.

Autobianchi (Italian: [autoˈbjaŋki]) was an Italian automobile manufacturer, created jointly by Bianchi, Pirelli and Fiat in 1955. Autobianchi produced only a handful of models during its lifetime, which were almost exclusively small cars, with the biggest being the short-lived Autobianchi A111, a small family car. Autobianchis were priced higher than Fiat models of similar size and the brand was used by Fiat to test innovative concepts which later found their way into mainstream Fiat vehicles; these concepts included fibreglass bodies and front-wheel drive.

The most famous Autobianchi models include the A112 released in 1969, a small hatchback very popular in Italy for racing, and which ceased production in 1986; as well as the Y10, which was the first car to use Fiat's new FIRE (Fully Integrated Robotised Engine). With the Primula model, Fiat was able to introduce and prove an innovative front-engine, front-drive layout, which enabled an especially large interior volume and ultimately became the predominant front engine/drive layout, worldwide.

Autobianchi was subsequently purchased by the Fiat group and integrated into the operations of Lancia. The Autobianchi marque survived in Italy until 1995, when Y10 production ended.

== History ==
=== Origins ===
Bianchi, founded in 1885 by Edoardo Bianchi and now remembered primarily as a bicycle manufacturer, was also active in passenger car manufacturing from 1899. Bianchis were in general high-end luxury cars, made with high attention to detail. The company's factory in Abruzzi was destroyed by bombing during World War II. Edoardo Bianchi himself died in 1946 in a car accident, and the ownership of the firm passed to his son, Giuseppe. Even though a new, modern facility was constructed in Desio after the war, economic conditions forced Giuseppe not to resume passenger car production, but rather to focus on bicycles, motorcycles and commercial vehicles. Bianchi bicycles are still manufactured.

Bianchi's general manager, Ferruccio Quintavalle, wanted to take advantage of the company's extensive experience in manufacturing cars and ordered the preparation of studies and prototypes of possible new models. Soon it became apparent that resuming passenger car production would not be feasible without the help of a stronger partner. Therefore, Bianchi turned to large industrial groups Fiat and Pirelli with a proposal to form a new company to produce automobiles. Thus, the Autobianchi company was born, with the agreement signed by the three parties on 11 January 1955, and share capital of 3 million lira, 33% of which belonged to the Bianchi family. A new, modern, purpose-built plant for the production of Autobianchi cars was erected on an area of 140,000 square metres in Desio.

Each of the partners had a clearly defined role and interest in the venture. Fiat was to provide the technical base and components for the assembly of the cars. It was seeking to capture the premium niche of the small car market, at that time occupied by coachbuilders such as Moretti and Vignale, who were building their models on Fiat chassis. Pirelli, which was to supply tires for the cars, sought to expand their OEM market share. Bianchi, was assigned the duties of preparing the bodies and assembling complete vehicles; a step towards their desired return to full passenger car production.

=== The Bianchina ===
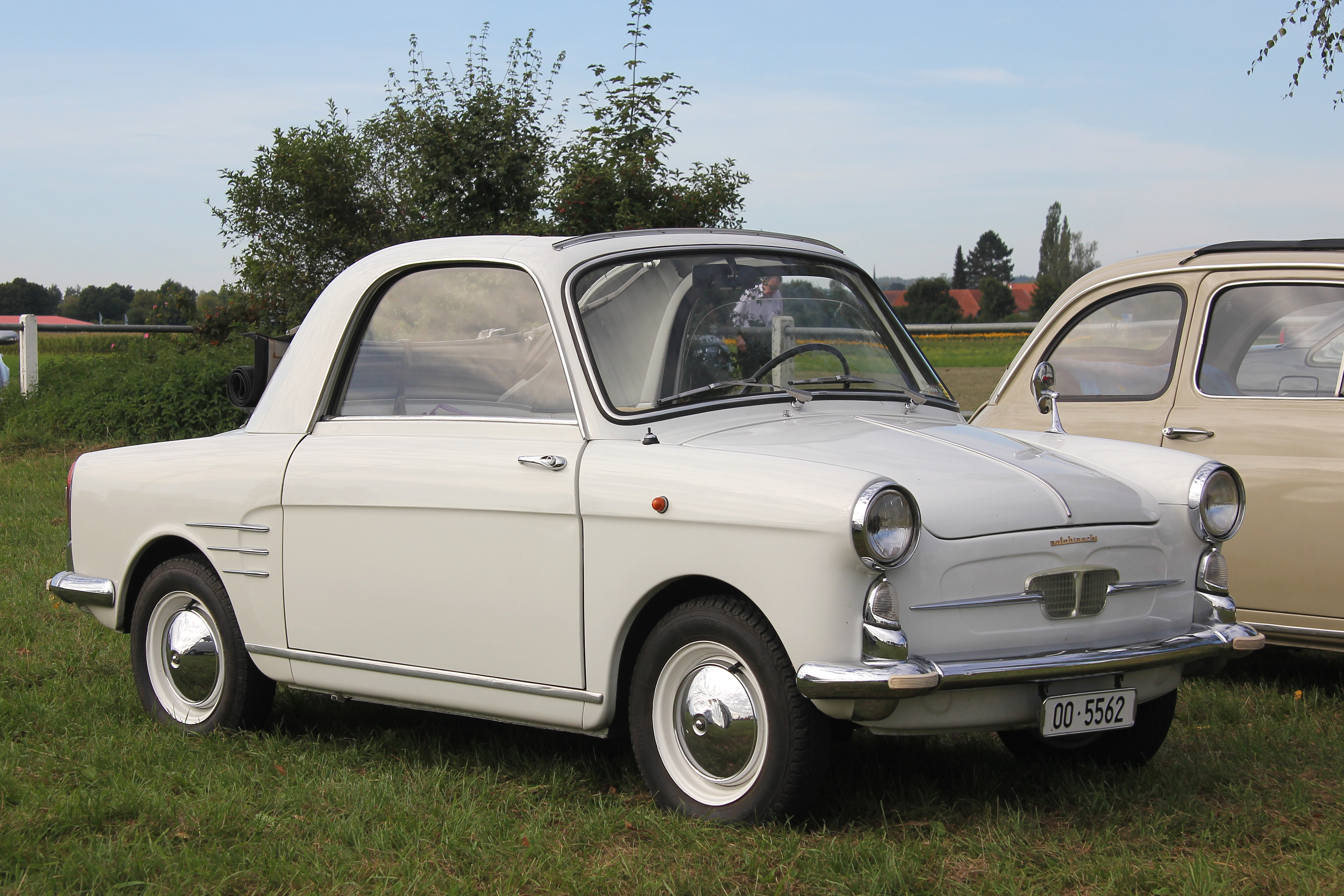
Autobianchi Bianchina Trasformabile Special

The first car to be produced by the new company was the Bianchina, whose name was a tribute to Edoardo Bianchi's first 1899 car. The Bianchina was based on Fiat 500 mechanicals – with its two-cylinder, air-cooled engine mounted in the rear – but featured a completely new stylish body designed by Luigi Rapi, who was in charge of Fiat's special body unit and helped to set up production in Desio. With many premium design and equipment features, the Bianchina was an upscale city car, positioned above the Fiat 500 in the market. Marketed as a "second vehicle in the household", and a luxurious "recreational vehicle", also being targeted at affluent middle-class women, it mirrored the increasing affluence in Italian society.

The first Bianchina rolled from the production lines in Desio on September 11, 1957, and had the unusual body style of a two-door landaulet, called "Trasformabile". It remained the sole body style until 1960, when a two-door "Cabriolet" full convertible was introduced, followed by a three-door estate version, the "Panoramica" and a two-door saloon, the "Berlina". Finally, two van versions were launched: one resembling a two-seater version of the Panoramica, and another, with a raised and expanded cargo section.

=== Stellina and Primula – Autobianchi pioneers new concepts ===
Five years after the debut of the Bianchina, at the 1963 Turin Motor Show, a completely new Autobianchi model debuted: the Autobianchi Stellina. A two-door spider based on the Fiat 600D's chassis was distinguished by its fibreglass body, designed by Tom Tjaarda. It was Italy's first production car with such a body. The vehicle was only produced for two years (1964 and 1965) and only 502 Stellinas were made. Nevertheless, the model was an important step in the development of new technology for Fiat and the rest of the automotive industry. Its lofty price-tag of almost a million lira further emphasized the elevated status of the Autobianchi brand within the Fiat empire.

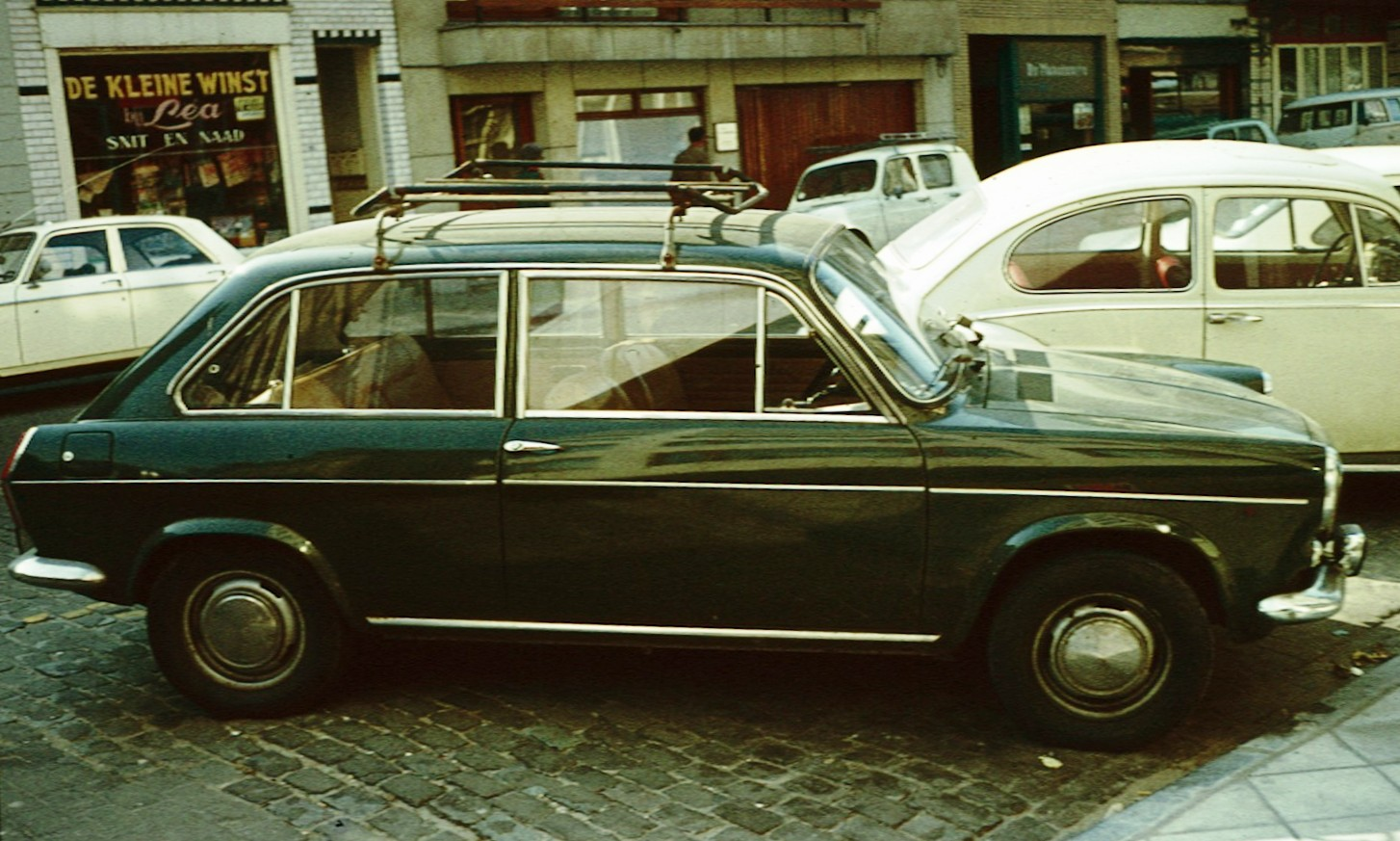
Autobianchi Primula 3-door

Even more important was the following year's presentation, the Autobianchi Primula. It was Fiat's first attempt at a front-wheel drive car with a transverse engine, a configuration popularized by the British Mini and allowing for very compact and efficient utilization of the body space. Designed by Fiat's technical director, Dante Giacosa, it was launched under the Autobianchi brand to test market reaction to the new concept. The Primula's particular configuration of front wheel drive with a transverse engine, but with a gearbox on the end of the engine and unequal length drive shafts, rather than a gearbox in the sump like the Mini, became universal; as did its use of conventional steel suspension in almost all other cars with the exception of Citroen – usually MacPherson struts at the front and a "dead" rear axle. Indeed, Peugeot in facelifting their 305 range on the early 1980s switched from their former adherence to the Mini in-sump gearbox to the Primula's end-on gearbox configuration. The Primula is thus a car design of far greater significance than is often realised, as its design influence spread far beyond even the mainstream high volume Fiats such as the 127 and the 128 of the late 1960s. Even though the new Autobianchi was priced higher than Fiat models of similar size, the car met with a favorable reception. Fiat would gradually move all of its models to front-wheel drive.

Throughout its production run the Primula was available as a two-door or four-door saloon, three-door of five-door hatchback, and two-door coupé, with either a 1,221 cc or a 1,197 cc four-cylinder engine. The top-of-the-line Primula Coupé S used a 75 PS (SAE) 1,438 cc four-cylinder from the Fiat 124 Special. The lack of a fifth gear limited the high-end capacity of all Primula models.

=== Into the 1970s ===
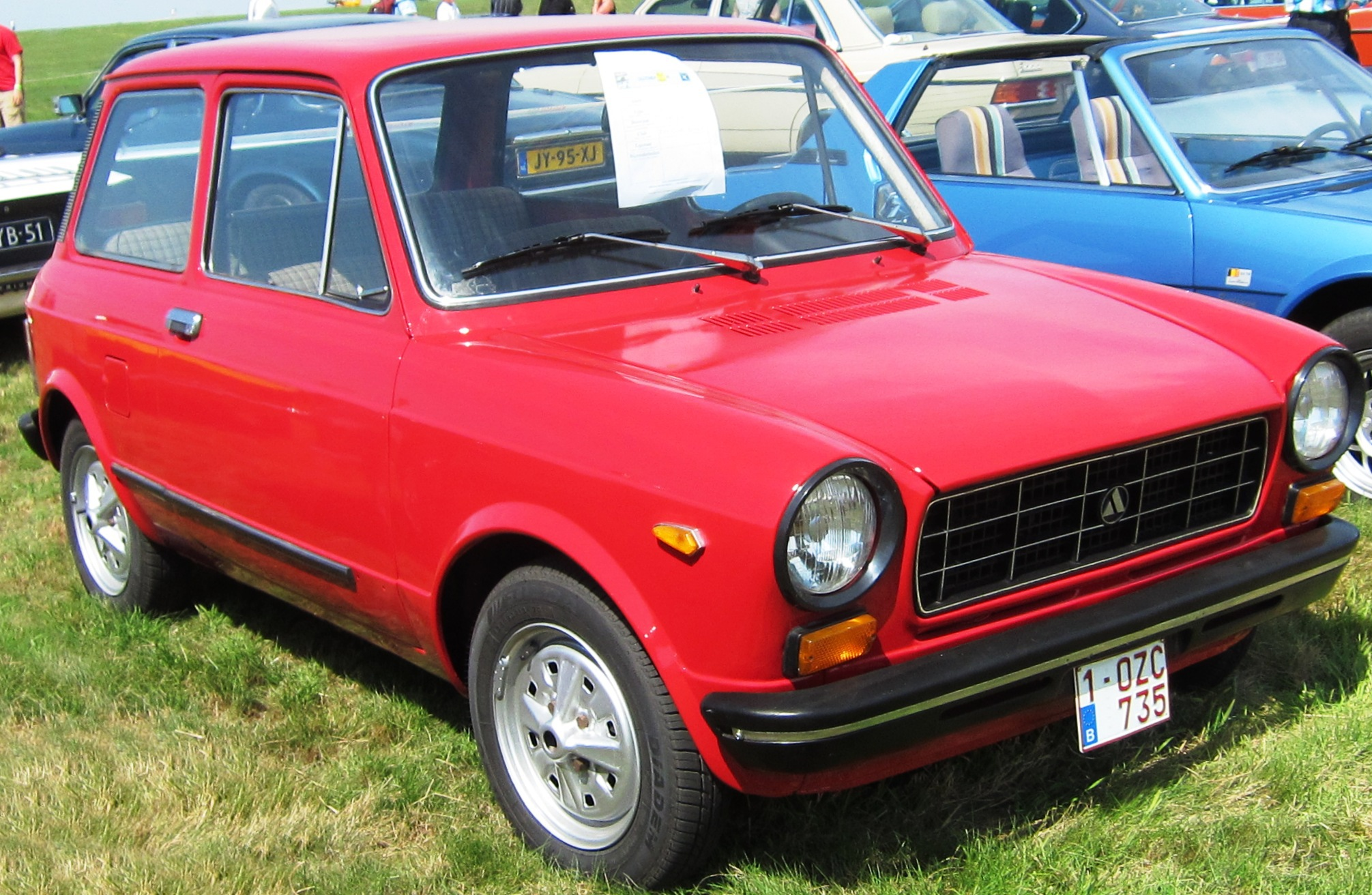
Autobianchi A112

Facing a crisis in the motorcycle market, Bianchi was forced to sell its share in Autobianchi and the company was finally fully integrated into Fiat S.p.A. in 1968. 1969 marked many important developments for the marque. First of all, Bianchina production was finally stopped. Moreover, Autobianchi was positioned within the Fiat Group under the control of the newly acquired luxury marque Lancia. And significantly, two new Autobianchi models were launched this year: the Autobianchi A111 and Autobianchi A112, both named after their internal Fiat development codes, in a similar fashion to coeval Fiat-branded vehicles.

The A111 was derived from Primula mechanicals, but much bigger and more spacious, marking the first (and only) entry of the brand into the small family car class. As usual, it was priced higher than similar Fiat models, notably the first front-wheel drive Fiat per se, the Fiat 128, and did not find much favour with customers. After little more than 50,000 A111s were made, production ended in 1972. The A112 was much more successful. A modern, front-wheel drive supermini it was in many ways similar to the Innocenti Mini, which gained substantial popularity in Italy, following on from the popularity of the original Mini throughout Europe. Similarly, the A112 saw strong demand and built a loyal following, reinforced by the introduction of Abarth sporting versions and Autobianchi's engagement in racing with modified versions of the model.

With Primula production ceasing in 1970 and the quick demise of the A111, Autobianchi became effectively a one-model brand. Consequently, the A112 was marketed as a Lancia from the mid-1970s in most markets, except for Italy, France and Israel, where it retained the Autobianchi branding until the end of production.

=== Discontinuation ===
The A112 continued in production for 17 years, with frequent, often substantial, changes. After production over 1,250,000, the last A112 was built in May 1986 and was replaced by the Autobianchi Y10, based mechanically on the Fiat Panda. Branded as a Lancia for most export markets (except for France and Israel, until 1989), it retained Autobianchi badging and branding in Italy. The Desio plant closed in 1992 and the Y10 replaced by the Lancia Y (branded as Lancia in all markets including Italy), the Autobianchi brand ended in 1996.

The rights to the brand are now held by the Registro Autobianchi, the official club of the marque in Italy.
