= Ettore Cordiano =

Automotive engineer at Fiat

- Born: 1923; Messina
- Died: 20 February 1998 (aged 74–75); Turin
- Education: Polytechnic University of Turin
- Spouse: Francesca
- Children: Marco Cordiano
- Parent: Giuseppe Cordiano
- Engineering career
- Discipline: automotive engineering
- Institutions: SIRA
- Employer: Fiat S.p.A.
- Projects: Autobianchi Primula
- Significant design: compact clutch assembly for front wheel drive

Ettore Cordiano (Messina, 1923 – Turin, 22 February 1998) was an automotive engineer who mainly worked for Fiat S.p.A. and I.DE.A Institute. He is known for the technological concept that best enables transverse engine placement and front wheel drive, nowadays the norm in many car segments.

== Career ==
Cordiano started his studies in 1944 at the Polytechnic University of Turin, and after a course in automobile design specialized in engine technology. Via a recruiter looking for the best engineers, he was hired by Fiat, while he still studied for his PhD.

After starting at Fiat in 1948, Cordiano spent a couple of years at the Heilbronn (Germany) branch, where the best engineers of the Fiat Automobile Technical Office were sent to gain experience in car development. In 1956, Cordiano would become fully responsible for the Heilbronn Study Centre. Meanwhile he had learned the German language.

From 1958 until 1966, Cordiano was department director for advanced research and development, working directly with Dante Giacosa, Fiat's lead engineer since 1946.

In 1966, Cordiano had become the director of the board of development and product planning of Fiat passenger cars. After Dante Giacosa retired in 1970, he stepped into his shoes and became the final responsible director of engineering at Fiat Auto.

== Professional achievements ==
Around 1960, Cordiano came up with the idea of setting up scouting and research centres in what were considered the three leading countries in the automotive field: United States (Detroit), Japan (Tokyo) and Germany (Heilbronn). There, Fiat staff would be able to work close to where other cultures and creatives were producing designs that would once make it elsewhere in the world.

Around the same time, Giacosa had decided to pick up his front wheel drive development project again (it was abandoned in 1947) because it had many advantages for small and mid-size cars, especially when built with a transversely placed engine and gearbox. But for various reasons he didn't want to use the solution already in production in BMC's Mini, where the transmission is underneath the engine and both share the oil sump. Putting the engine and transmission in one line, but with separate oil systems, however, would create a unit that would be too wide for a normal sized engine bay. Cordiano took up the challenge and constructed a clutch system about 40 mm (1.6 in) compacter than normal, thus cutting the unit width by that same size (some sources even speak of a 100 mm (3.9 in) gain). Although Giacosa was the father of the overall concept, this breakthrough solution by Cordiano can be seen as the key to front wheel drive with a transverse engine and gearbox, with separate oil sumps, which became the standard for most small and medium sized ICE cars since the 1970s. It premiered in the Autobianchi Primula of 1964.

Some of the other automotive engineering solutions developed by Cordiano, for which he received patents, are: a hydraulic braking system, power-assisted rack-and-pinion steering mechanism, electronic device for indicating engine speed (to inform the driver he should switch gears), synchroniser for a gearbox, independent driven wheel suspension (for Fiat 130 and Fiat Dino). Cordiano also was director of the 130 development project X1/3.

Later in his career, Cordiano contributed to the establishment of I.DE.A Institute in 1978, an initiative of Franco Mantegazza, who had been trained by him.

== Personal ==
Cordiano was married and had one son. He wasn't the typical director. Despite his high position, he remained self-critical and did not see himself as 'boss'. His interests outside engineering were collecting sniff-tobacco boxes, studying 18th century paintings and reading belles-lettres and crime fiction.
