= Autobianchi Primula =

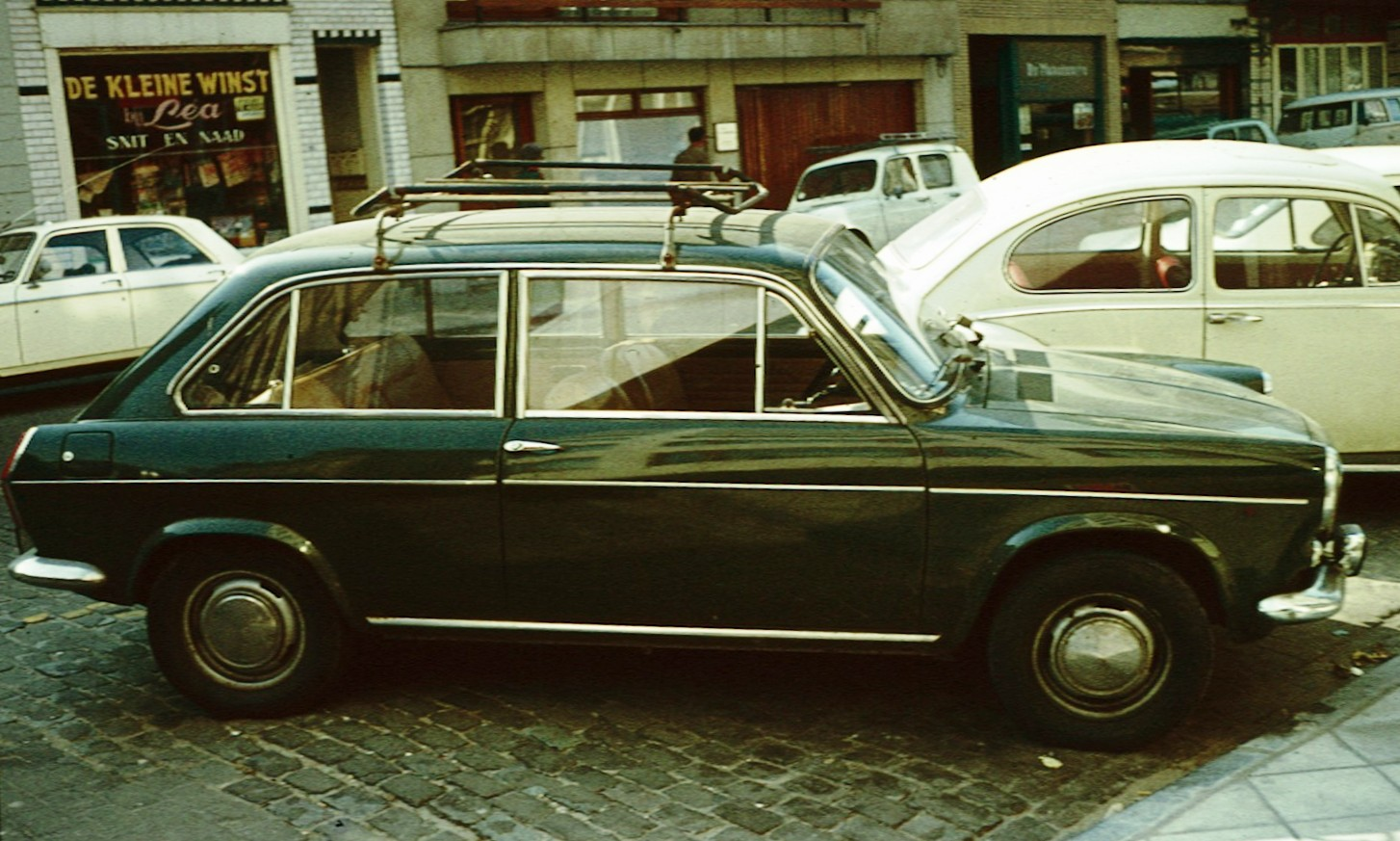
- Autobianchi Primula 65C 3-door hatchback

Overview
- Manufacturer: Autobianchi
- Production: 1964–1970
- Assembly: Italy: Desio, Milan
- Designer: Dante Giacosa (Berlina); Touring (Coupé)

Body and chassis
- Class: Supermini
- Body style: 2-door saloon; 4-door saloon; 3-door hatchback; 5-door hatchback; 2-door coupé
- Layout: Transverse front-engine, front-wheel-drive
- Related: Autobianchi A111

Powertrain
- Engine: 1,221 cc OHV I4 (Berlina and Coupé); 1,197 cc OHV I4 (Berlina 65C); 1,438 cc OHV I4 (Coupé S)
- Transmission: 4-speed manual

Dimensions
- Wheelbase: 2,300 mm (91 in)
- Length: 3,785 mm (149.0 in) (Berlina); 3,715 mm (146.3 in) (Coupé)
- Width: 1,578 mm (62.1 in)
- Height: 1,400 mm (55 in) (Berlina); 1,350 mm (53 in) (Coupé)

Chronology
- Successor: Autobianchi A111; Autobianchi A112

The Autobianchi Primula is a supermini economy car manufactured between 1964 and 1970 by the Italian automaker Autobianchi, partly owned by and later a subsidiary of the Fiat Group.

The Primula is best known for its automotive legacy as one of the first Italian front-wheel-drive cars; it integrated a hatchback body configuration with the innovative Dante Giacosa-designed front-wheel drive, transverse engine layout (later popularized by the Fiat 128) and an engine layout/body configuration that would ultimately become an industry-standard.

For model year 1964, the Primula was introduced as a three-door hatchback. For model year 1965, Autobianchi introduced sedan, five-door hatchback as well as fastback coupé variants, the latter designed by Carrozzeria Touring.

The Primula was manufactured in the Autobianchi factory in Desio, with production reaching approximately 75,000 before ending in 1970. It was Fiat's first model with rack and pinion steering.

The Primula nameplate derives from the genus of herbaceous perennial plants, in English, primrose.

== Concept ==
Prior to the Primula, all Fiat Group passenger cars were rear-wheel drive; the larger models following the classic FR layout (front engine powering the rear axle), and small cars using a rear-engine, rear drive layout. Fiat had steered away from a transverse, front-drive configuration after a 1932 test accident during which the first front-wheel-drive FIAT prototype caught fire, personally involving Giovanni Agnelli.

Meanwhile, a practical concept emerged, namely the front-wheel drive layout with the engine mounted transversely, allowing for very efficient space utilization and popularized by the British Motor Corporation's Mini, launched in 1959. That car had its transmission integrated into the engine's oil sump, producing a very compact drivetrain suitable a small car, though poorly refined, loud and awkward to service. The early issues were resolved and the concept spread to larger BMC products, notably the 1100/1300 series built in Italy by Innocenti. These larger models did not require the transmission-in-sump arrangement for the purposes of space utilization (as on the Mini) but retained it for design and parts commonality.

Fiat's chief designer, Dante Giacosa, recognized the potential of the concept and sought ways to improve on it - namely by removing the transmission from the sump. This would produce a larger overall powertrain unit but this was not essential in the type of cars Giacosa proposed. In return such cars would be easier to service and repair and benefit from greater refinement and lower noise levels.

Oreste Lardone and Giacosa managed to convince Fiat's top management to experiment again with a technical solution that offered clear advantage on small and medium-sized cars. No one, however, felt like using the FIAT brand for this experiment, preferring the less crucial Autobianchi brand. Thus began 1961's "Project 109". Using a new floor pan and placing an inline four cylinder engine in a transverse arrangement with a synchronized first gear, which would become the 1964 front-drive Primula.

Key to the innovative design was a compact concentric clutch release mechanism engineered by Ettore Cordiano, using a hydraulic piston mounted inside a hollow gearbox input shaft, thus doing away with the traditional external clutch lever and release arm and the internal clutch thrust bearing. This allowed the powertrain to be short enough to fit across the Primula's engine bay while allowing for the required steering angles and the determined overall width. With the transmission mounted end-on to the engine and the final drive therefore offset from the car's centre line, the Primula had unequal-length driveshafts.

== Driveline ==
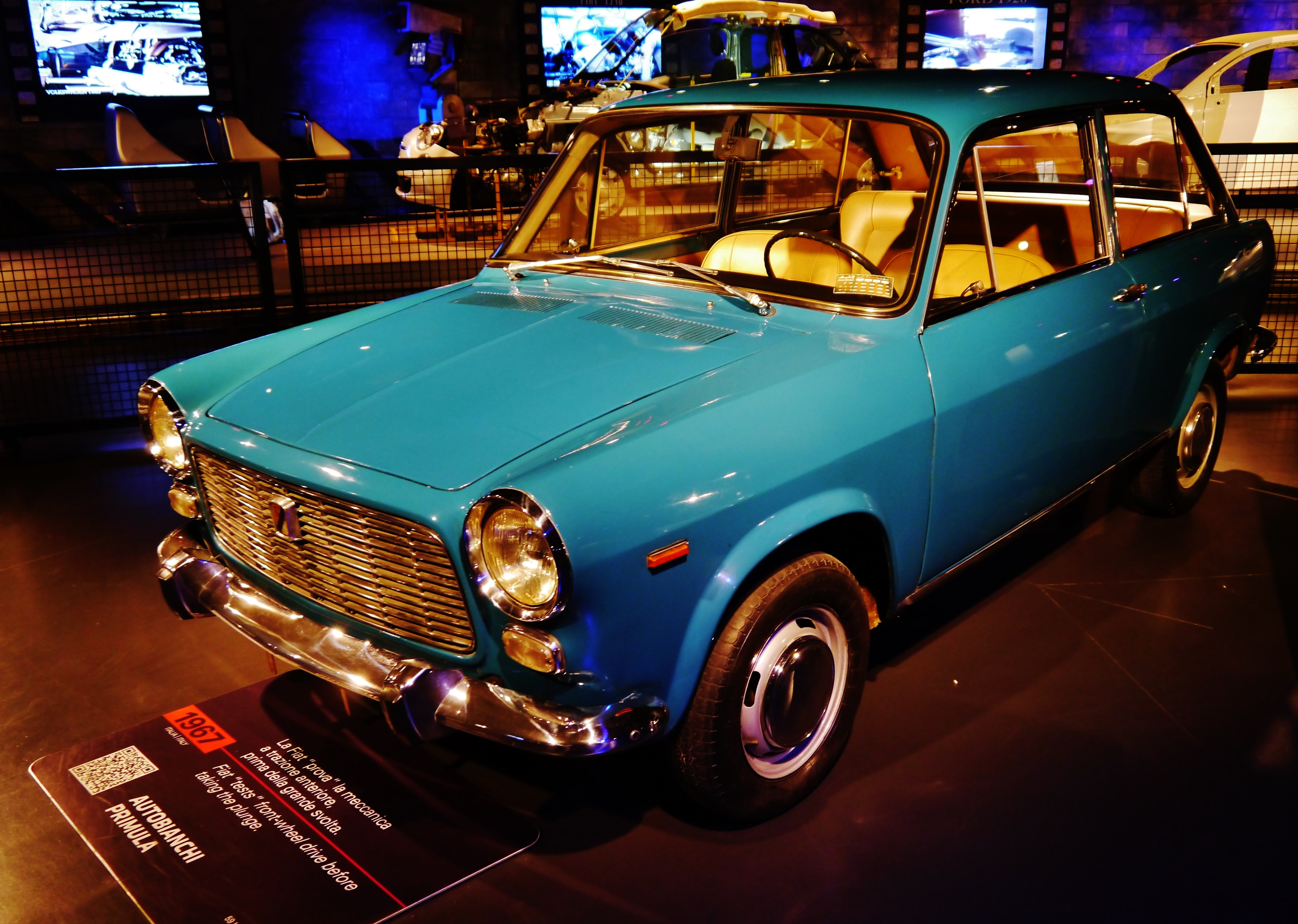
Autobianchi Primula at National Automobile Museum, Turin

Initially, the Primula was fitted with the 1221 cc engine from the Fiat 1100 D (for the coupé it was uprated to 65 hp (48 kW)), but in 1968 it was replaced with Fiat 124 engines—the berlinas received the 1197 cc 60 hp (45 kW) engine from the standard versions, while the coupé was fitted with the more powerful 1438 cc 70 hp (52 kW) unit. All engines used in the Primula had overhead valves (OHV)—the later twin cam derivative of the 1438 cc unit was not used in any Autobianchi (Fiat did use it later in the Lancia Beta- the issue at the time in a transverse installation of a twin-cam head being the arrangement of the exhaust manifold of the necessarily cross-flow head). Unlike contemporaneous BMC and Peugeot models, which had the transmission in the oil sump, the Primula had its manual transmission placed end-on, above the differential. The Primula also featured disc brakes on all four wheels, uncommon in small cars of the time.

The Primula's particular configuration of front wheel drive and transverse engine, but with a gearbox on the end of the engine, Fiat-designed clutch release mechanism and unequal length drive shafts, rather than a gearbox in the sump like the Mini, has become universal among front-wheel-drive cars. The suspension used a single wishbone and upper transverse leaf spring at the front (which eliminated an upper suspension arm pivot and thus allowed space for the gearbox), with a "dead" axle at the rear. The Primula is thus a car design of great significance, as its design influence spread, far beyond even the mainstream high volume Fiats such as the 128 and the 127 of the late 1960s which used its driveline layout combined with MacPherson struts (which also allowed space for the gearbox); to every front wheel drive transverse engined car in production today.

== Reception ==
The Primula was favorably received in the marketplace and came second in the 1965 European Car of the Year awards, after another front-wheel drive car, the Austin 1800. This convinced Fiat to develop the drive concept further. In 1969 the first Fiat with a front-mounted transverse engine, the Fiat 128, was launched, along with two new front-wheel drive Autobianchis: the Autobianchi A112, smaller than the Primula, and the larger Autobianchi A111. The 128 secured Fiat the Car of the Year title in 1970, with A112 coming second.
