= Transverse engine =

Vehicle engine whose crankshaft axis is perpendicular to the direction of travel

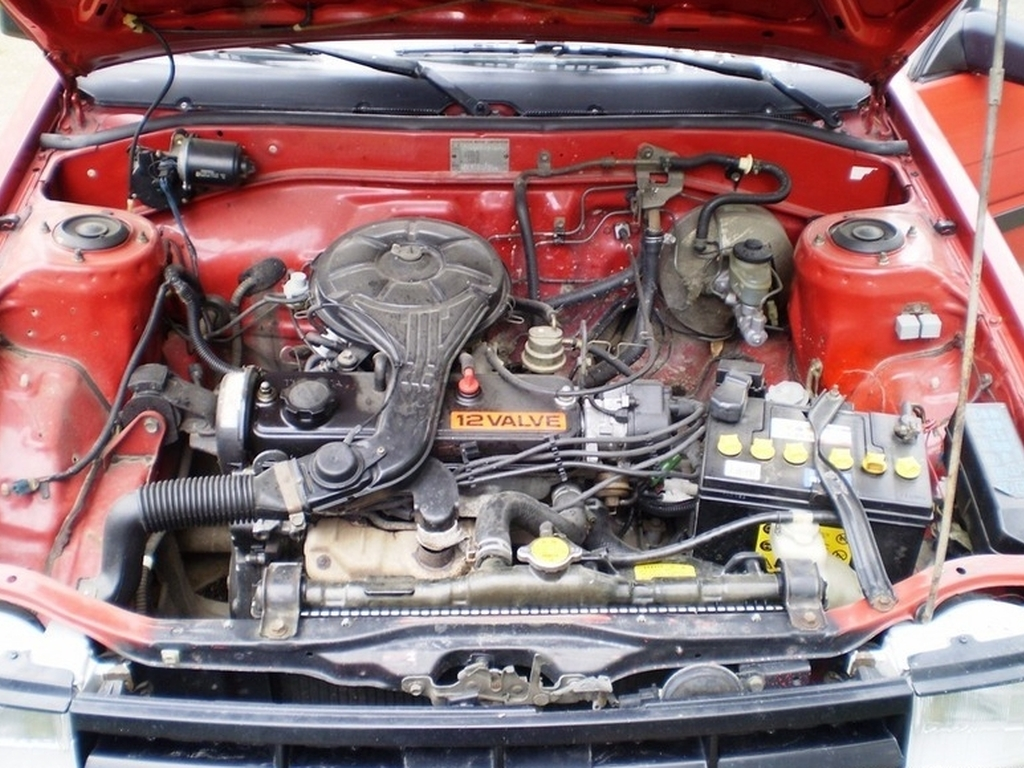
Transversely mounted engine in Toyota Corolla E80

A transverse engine is an engine mounted in a vehicle so that the engine's crankshaft axis is perpendicular to the direction of travel. Many modern front-wheel drive vehicles use this arrangement. Most rear-wheel drive vehicles use a longitudinal engine, where the engine's crankshaft axis is parallel with the direction of travel. (Some rear-mid engine vehicles use a transverse engine and transaxle mounted in the rear instead of the front). Transverse engines save space in light vehicles, and are used on armoured fighting vehicles for the same reason.

== History ==
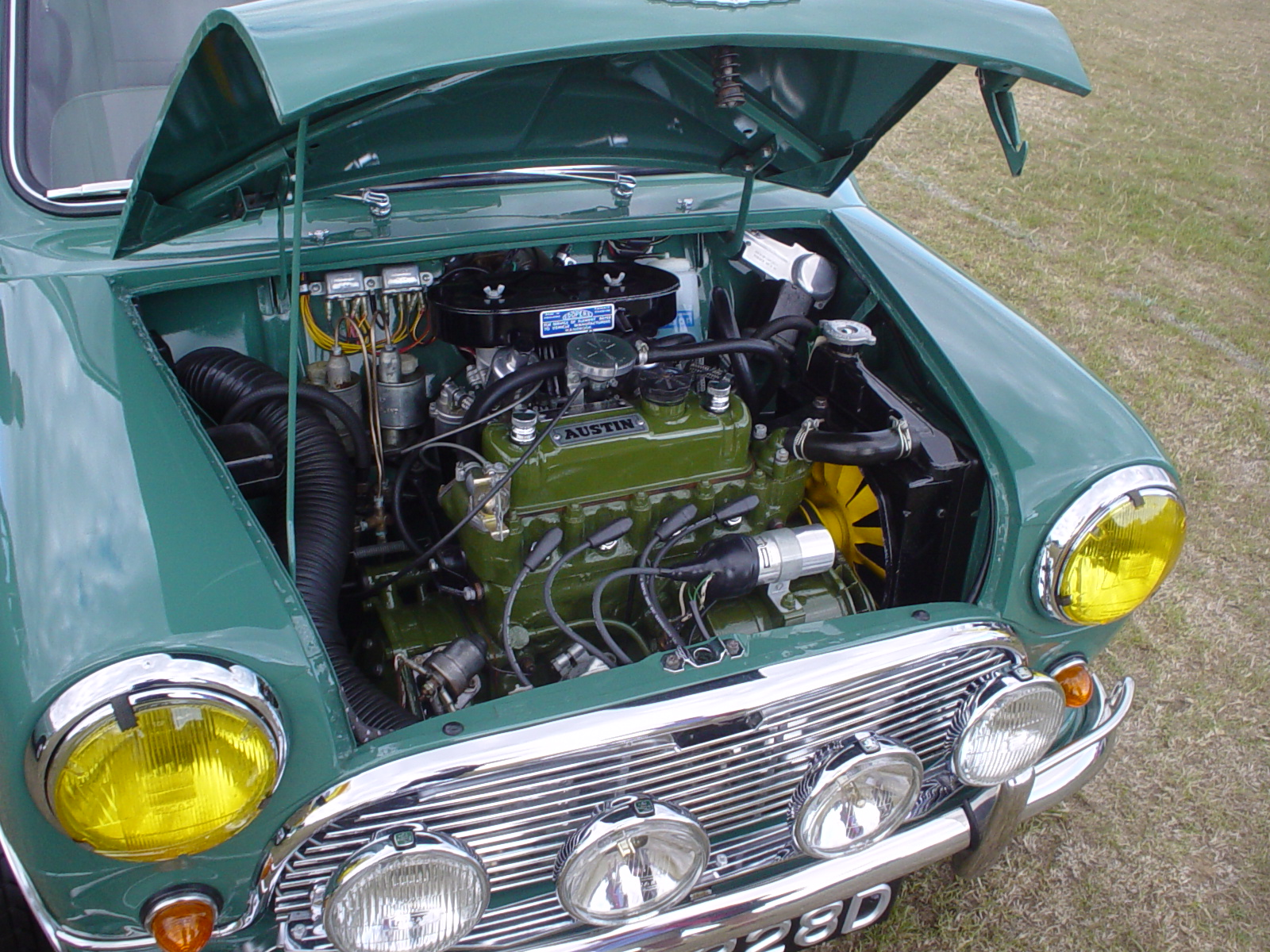
Transversely mounted engine in Mini Cooper

The Critchley light car, made by the Daimler Motor Company in 1899, had a transverse engine with belt drive to the rear axle. The first successful transverse-engine cars were the two-cylinder DKW F1 series of cars, which first appeared in 1931.

During WWII, transverse engines were developed for armored vehicles, with the Soviet T-44 and T-54/T-55 tanks being equipped with transverse engines to save space within the hull. The T-54/55 eventually became the most produced tank in history.

=== Postwar use ===
After the Second World War, Saab used the configuration in their first model, the Saab 92, in 1947. The arrangement was also used for Borgward's Goliath and Hansa brand cars. The East German-built Trabant, which appeared in 1957, also had a transversely mounted two stroke engine, and this design was kept until the end of production, in 1991. However, it was with Alec Issigonis's Mini, introduced by the British Motor Corporation in 1959, that the design gained acclaim. Issigonis incorporated the car's transmission into the engine's sump, producing a drivetrain unit narrow enough to install transversely in a car only 4 feet (1.2 m) wide. While previous DKW and Saab cars used small, unrefined air-cooled two-stroke engines with poor performance, the gearbox-in-sump arrangement meant that an 848 cc four-cylinder water-cooled engine could be fitted to the Mini, providing strong performance for a car of its size. Coupled to the much greater amount of interior space afforded by the layout (the entire drivetrain only took up 20% of the car's length), this made the Mini a genuine alternative to the conventional small family car.

This design reached its peak starting with Dante Giacosa's elaboration of it for Fiat. He connected the engine to its gearbox by a shaft and set the differential off-center so that it could be connected to the gearbox more easily. The half shafts from the differential to the wheels therefore differed in length, which would have made the car's steering asymmetrical were it not for their torsional stiffness being made the same. Giacosa's layout was first used in the Autobianchi Primula in 1964 and later in the popular Fiat 128. With the gearbox mounted separately to the engine, these cars were by necessity larger than the Mini, but this proved to be no disadvantage. This layout, still in use today, also provided superior refinement, easier repair and was better-suited to adopting five-speed transmissions than the original Issigonis in-sump design.

The Lamborghini Miura used a transverse mid-mounted 4.0-litre V12. This configuration was unheard of in 1965, but became more common in the following decades, with cars such as the Lancia Montecarlo, Noble M12, Toyota MR2, Pontiac Fiero, and first-generation Honda NSX using such a powertrain design.

The Land Rover LR2 Freelander, along with all Volvo models from 1998 on (including V8 models), employ a transversely-mounted engine in order to increase passenger space inside the vehicle. This has also allowed for improved safety in a frontal impact, due to more longitudinal engine compartment space being created. The result is a larger front crumple zone.

Transverse engines have been widely used in buses. In the United States, they were offered in the early 1930s by Twin Coach and used with limited success in Dwight Austin's Pickwick Nite-Coach. Transverse bus engines first appeared widely in the Yellow Coach 719, using Dwight Austin's V-drive; they continued in common use until the 1990s, though shorter V-configuration engines in a longitudinal "T-drive" configuration became common in the 1960s. Transverse engines were used in the British Leyland Atlantean, in many transit buses, and in nearly all modern double decker buses. They have been widely used by Scania, MAN, Volvo and Renault's bus divisions.

== Position placement of transverse engines ==
Engines may be placed in two main positions within the motor car:

- Front-engine transversely-mounted / Front-wheel drive
- Rear mid-engine transversely-mounted / Rear-wheel drive

== Common types of transversely placed engines ==
Space allowed for engines within the front wheel wells is commonly limited to the following:

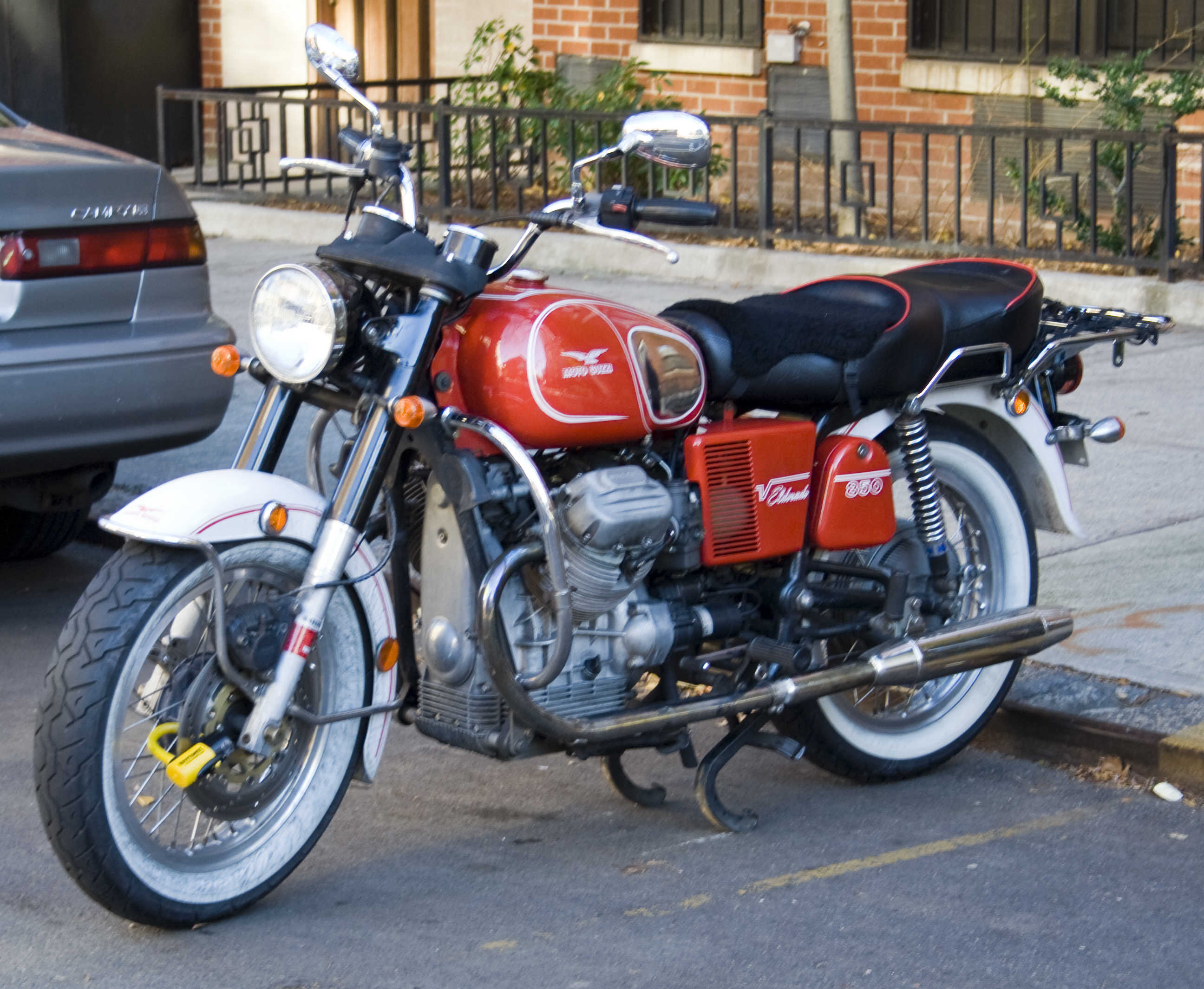
The engine in this Moto Guzzi motorcycle is described as "transverse" despite the crankshaft being in line with the frame.

- Single cylinder
- Inline-two
- Inline-three
- Inline-four
- Inline-five
- Inline-six (for rear-engined buses)
- V4
- V6

== Less common types of transversely-placed engines ==
- Inline-six: Austin Kimberley, Tasman; Austin 2200, Morris 2200, Wolseley Six); Austin/Morris 2200 HL, Wolseley Saloon, Princess; Daewoo Magnus (aka Chevrolet Epica/Evanda, Suzuki Verona); Daewoo Tosca (aka Chevrolet/Holden Epica); Land Rover Freelander 2 (aka LR2); Volvo S80; Volvo S60 (2nd generation, also V60); Volvo V70 (3rd generation); Volvo XC60; Volvo XC90
- V8: Buick LaCrosse LaCrosse Super (2008–2009), Cadillac Allanté, Ford Taurus SHO (3rd generation), Hyundai Equus/Centennial (1st generation), Lancia Thema 8.32, Lincoln Continental (1995-2002 only), Mitsubishi Dignity, Mitsubishi Proudia, Oldsmobile Aurora, Volvo S80, Volvo XC90
- V12 (mid-engine only): Lamborghini Miura
- V16 (mid-engine only): Cizeta-Moroder V16T

== Alternative convention with twin-cylinder motorcycles ==
The description of the orientation of V-twin and flat-twin motorcycle engines sometimes differs from the convention as stated above. Motorcycles with a V-twin engine mounted with its crankshaft parallel to the direction of travel, e.g. the AJS S3 V-twin, Indian 841, Victoria Bergmeister, Honda CX series and several Moto Guzzis since the 1960s, are said to have "transverse" engines, due to the cylinders being perpendicular to the direction of travel.
