= Dante Giacosa =

Italian automobile designer (1905–1996)

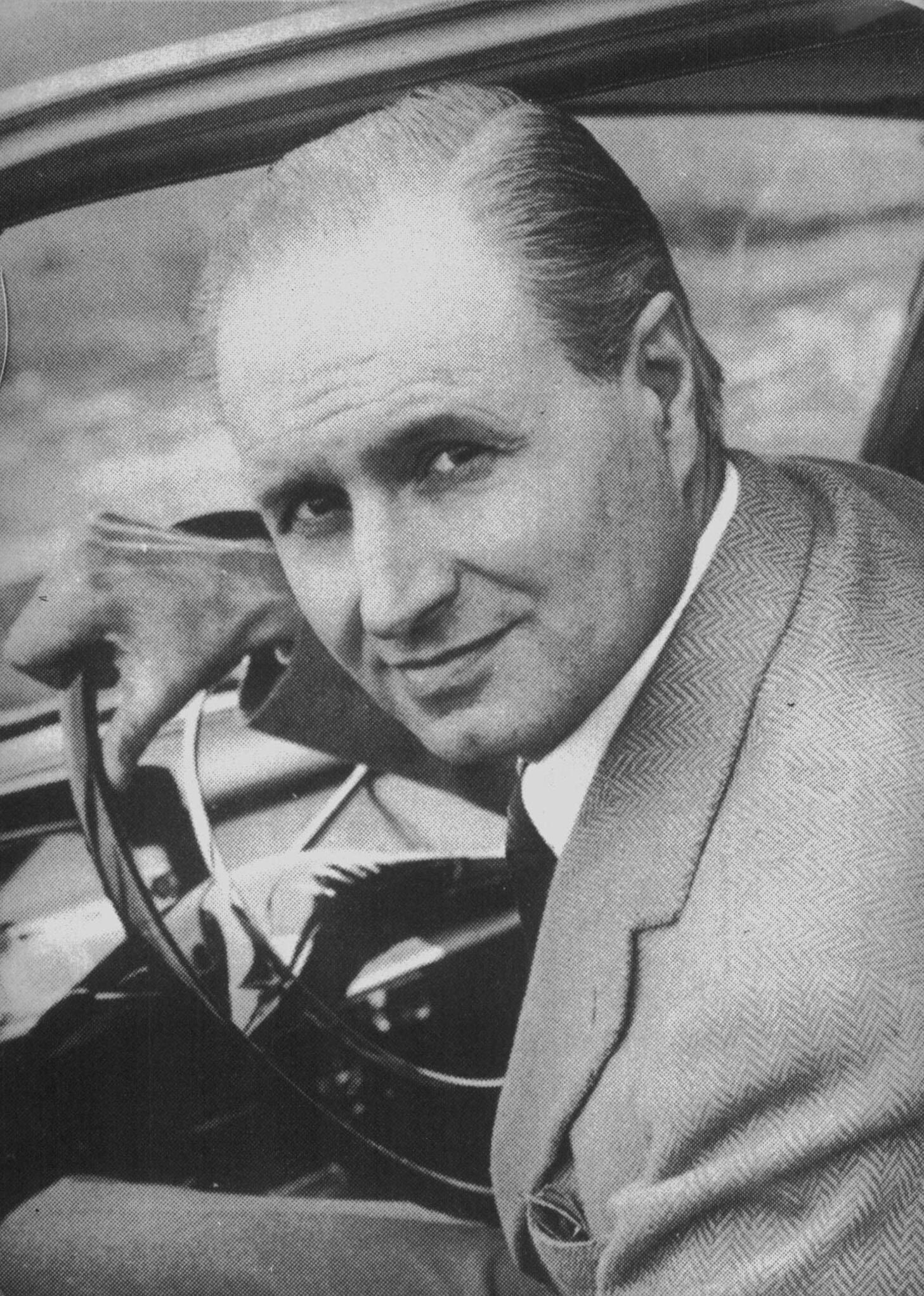
- Giacosa in 1966
- Born: 3 January 1905; Rome, Kingdom of Italy
- Died: 31 March 1996 (aged 91); Turin, Italy
- Occupations: Lead Engineer, Fiat, 1946 to 1970
- Known for: Industry Standard Front Wheel Drive Layout

Dante Giacosa (3 January 1905 – 31 March 1996) was an Italian automobile designer and engineer responsible for a range of Italian automobile designs — and for refining the front-wheel drive layout to an industry-standard configuration. He has been called the deus ex machina of Fiat.

== Background ==
Born in Rome, where his father was undertaking military service, Giacosa's family roots were in Neive on the southern edge of Piedmont. He studied engineering at the Polytechnic University of Turin until 1927. After completing his compulsory military service he joined Fiat in 1928, at first working on military vehicles and then in the aero engine division. The director of the aero-engine division was Tranquillo Zerbi, designer of Grand Prix cars for Fiat. In 1933 when work commenced on the Fiat 500, the director of the aero-engine division was Antonio Fessia. He had sufficient confidence to entrust the design of all the mechanical components of the car including the chassis to Giacosa. Giacosa was engineering manager at Fiat by 1937 and he had become director of the engineering division of Fiat by 1950. He retired from his full-time position with Fiat in 1970, but retained close association with the company courtesy of a position which translates as "Consulting Engineer to Fiat's Presidency and General Management and a Company's Ambassador with National and International Organizations". Following his retirement he wrote several volumes of memoirs concerning his professional life.

Giacosa served as President of FISITA, the International Federation of Automotive Engineering Societies, from 1967 to 1969 and authored Motori Endotermici (translated from Italian: Endothermic Engines), which discusses diverse features related to internal combustion machines with explanations of their design, construction and function. The work became a reference for mechanical engineering courses in many universities and was translated into numerous languages.

Giacosa died in Turin in 1996.

== Career ==
The Fiat Topolino was a state of the art two-seat miniature car that soon proved popular when production commenced in 1936. It was a two-seater and had a 569 cc side-valve engine. Its big advantage was the efficient use of the internal space, with the engine located over the front wheels and radiator behind it over the four-speed synchromesh gearbox. Independent front suspension with a transverse leaf spring and wishbones and excellent hydraulic brakes offered good ride comfort and safety. The fuel consumption was very low for the period, around 5.6 l/100 km. The maximum speed of 90 km/h coupled with good handling allowed average cruise speed of 60 km/h. Between 1936 when first introduced until the end of production in 1948, 122,000 were made of this original version.

Giacosa's subsequently designed the Fiat 508C, replacing the 508 Balilla, the 508C or as it became known as the "Millecento", had a short-stroke 1,100 cc (67 cu in) engine, with overhead valves (the 500 engine had side valves), an outstanding chassis design that earned it a reputation for good handling and ride quality. It was with a 508C chassis that as engineering manager Giacosa led a team that developed the Fiat 508CMM a streamlined coupe. Fiat used the car to win the 1100 cc class in the Mille Miglia of 1938. This model was produced in small numbers until 1940. The 508C was produced from 1937 to 1948, when it was replaced by an updated versions the 1100B and 1100E which was produced until 1953.

Wealthy Italian industrialist Piero Dusio approached Giacosa in 1944 with a request to design a single seat racing car that could be purchased for a relatively low price. This he did in his free time away for the Fiat factory. The design utilised components from the Fiat 500 and 508C. The resulting car the Cisitalia D46 was on sale in 1946. The space frame chassis was designed using steel tubes and the body consisted of light alloy panels - this was the famous superleggera ("super-light") construction technique. The Fiat 1100 cc fitted to the car was tuned to produce 60 bhp (61 PS; 45 kW) bhp. A maximum speed of 175 km/h (109 mph) was claimed. A batch of twenty cars was laid down in 1946 and the cars were raced successfully throughout the rest of the 1940s.

Giacosa did the initial design work on the next Cisitalia model, a two-seat sports car, the Project 202. Again he used a multi tube space frame chassis. The design being an adaptation of the single seat model. The prototype was fitted with a coupe body similar to the Fiat 508CMM. Before series production commenced, he passed over responsibility for the design to Giovanni Savonuzzi.

Though Giacosa had become director of the engineering division of Fiat, it didn't mean he could follow his own inclinations regarding the design of any new cars. The Fiat sales department had an overriding influence on new the model produced, and thus, the Fiat 1400 of 1950 was only a qualified success. Fiat wanted to produce a car that satisfied the needs of countries with a poor road system that had previously been supplied by American manufacturers before their cars had become bloated. They wanted a car with good stability, good visibility, and room for six people and their luggage, a speed of 120 km/h and a fuel consumption of 10 km/L. Unfortunately they also wanted the car with a modest size engine that wasn't too expensive to run in Italy. Despite Giacosa's best efforts they got a car that was neither one thing nor another. Only one hundred and twenty thousand examples were produced in eight years.

His next light car design was the 1100-103; this model perpetuated the name Millecento previously given to the 508C. This Millecento was a compact unitary construction saloon fitted with wishbones and coil springs at the front and a live axle and half-elliptic springs at the rear. Its excellent handling and good performance was in the tradition of its predecessor. Of conventional design for its period, with a water-cooled OHV inline four-cylinder engine of 1,089 cc (66.5 cu in), at first producing 33 bhp (33 PS; 25 kW) rising to 44 bhp (45 PS; 33 kW) but much more when tuned. The gearchange for the four-speed gearbox was on the steering column, and the handbrake worked on the transmission. Through a series of models culminating with the 1100R (the 1100D had a 1,221 cc (74.5 cu in) engine), the Millecento remained in production until 1970 and one and three quarter million examples had been produced.

=== Fiat 600 (1955) ===
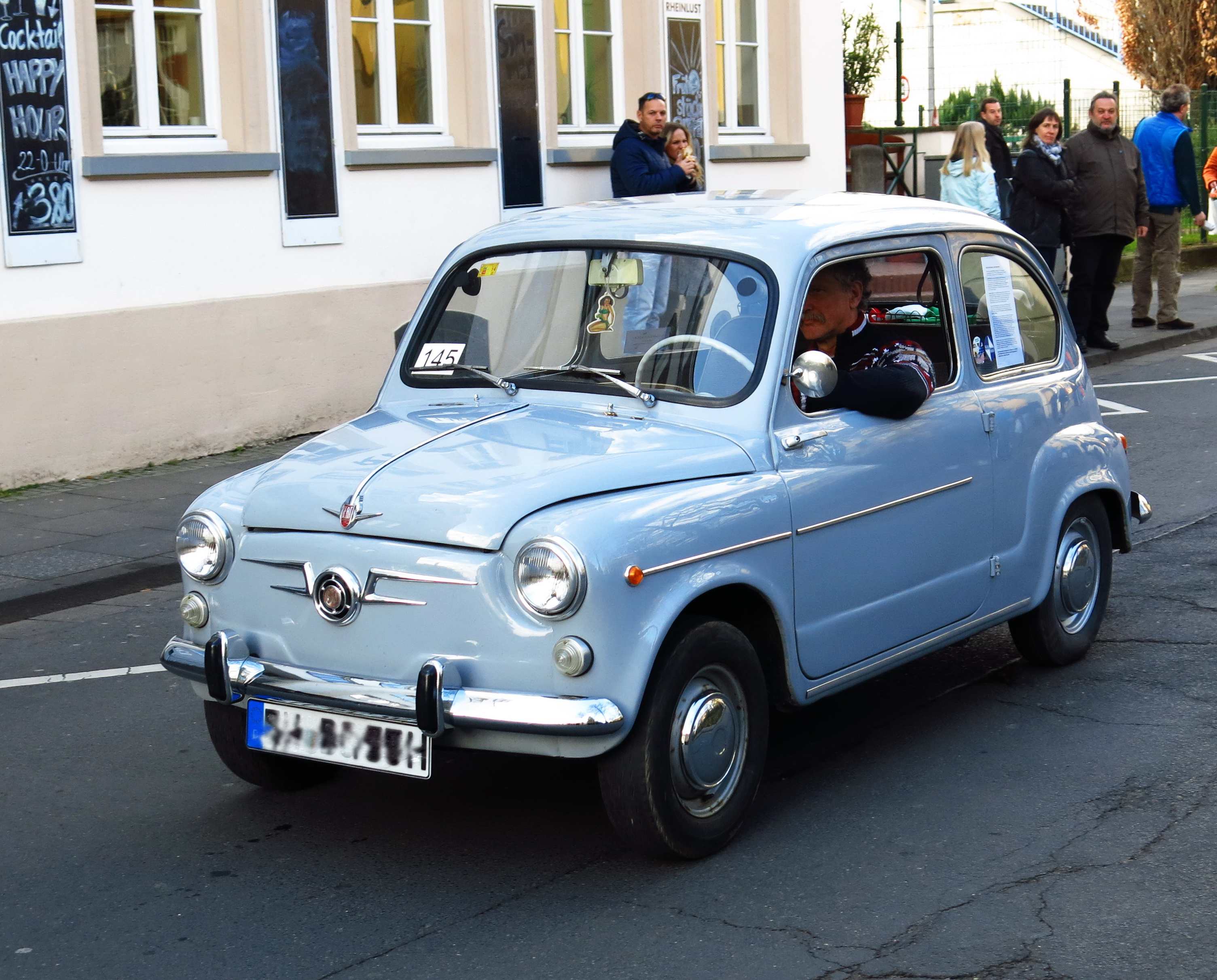
Fiat 600

Next Giacosa and his team designed a replacement for the Fiat 500 "Topolino". The last version of the 500C had been discontinued the previous year 1954. The Fiat 600 was a totally new car, and for Fiat a new layout with the engine at the rear as well as unitary construction. When the 600 were introduced in 1955, rear-engined cars had been produced for well over a decade and their advantages and disadvantages by then well known. Giacosa used the advantages to produce a four-seat car, although with limited luggage space, that had a reasonable performance from an engine of only 633 cc, due to its low weight of 585 kg (1,290 lb) and also compact dimensions. Capable of almost 100 km/h (62 mph) and returning a fuel consumption of 16 to 20 km/L and the ability to cruise at 80 km/h (50 mph). He overcame the stability problems associated with other rear-engined designs by identifying that the problem was not the weight distribution of the cars, but the simple swing axle rear suspension used in those designs. His answer was to use a semi-trailing arm type of rear suspension that eliminated the large change in the camber of the rear wheels that was inherent with the simple swing axle suspension system.

Within a year of the launch of the 600, a seven-seat version went in production, the Multipla (precursor to the contemporary minivan). By replacing the transverse leaf spring used in the front suspension by upper links and coil springs of the 1100-103, the mechanical components of the 600 were utilised in a forward control unitary body, removing the front luggage compartment and any trace of crumple zone (similar to the VW Type 2, but considerably smaller), therefore needing only a small increase in wheelbase to accommodate three rows of seats. Over seventy six thousand of this first version of the Multipla were produced by 1963. The 600 was replaced by the 600D in 1960. The engine size was increased to 767 cc (46.8 cu in), with a maximum speed up to 110 km/h (68 mph). Production ceased in Turin in 1970, but carried on in the SEAT factory in Barcelona. The 600 was also produced by NSU/Fiat in Germany, Zastava in Yugoslavia, and Concord in Argentina. Over two and a half million were eventually produced.

=== Nuova 500 (1957) ===
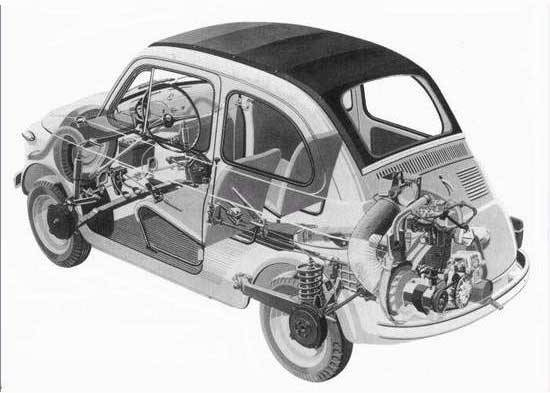
Fiat 500

Giacosa's next rear engine car for Fiat was the Nuova 500 of 1957, with a similar layout to the 600, but with a two-cylinder air-cooled engine instead of the water-cooled inline four-cylinder unit, and an unsynchronised 4-speed gearbox (the shortcomings of which being blunted by its own low inertial mass, plus that of the engine and entire vehicle), a layout kept for the entire lifespan of the model. Being a two/plus/two-seat car, it was the true replacement for the Topolino, at the bottom of the Fiat range. With a wheelbase fractionally over six feet and a length under nine feet, it was also a lightweight weighing less than five hundred kilograms. The 479 cc (29.2 cu in) engines in the early production cars were so underpowered, with only 13 bhp (13 PS; 9.7 kW), they were recalled and an uprated 16.5 bhp (12.3 kW) engine fitted. The final 500F of 1965 had a 499 cc (30.5 cu in) engine producing 18 bhp (18 PS; 13 kW), sufficient to get to 95 km/h (59 mph) and a fuel consumption 20 km/L. In 1960 Fiat introduced the Giardiniera, a 499 cc (30.5 cu in) station wagon with a similar inline twin-cylinder engine as the 500, but with cylinder horizontal. The engine was located under the floor at the rear of the car. With a slight increase in wheelbase and the weight increased to 570 kg, it was newer a four-seat car with a luggage area over the engine. In parallel with the Fiat models, the "500", platforms where clothed in prettier bodies by Autobianchi at their Desio factory. Named the Bianchina, a convertible; a four-seat saloon, an estate, and a van on the Giardiniera platform were later added. The Puch 500 was a version of the Nuova 500 made by the Austrian company Steyr-Puch from 1957, with their own boxer air-cooled engine and swing axle drive and suspension. Their Steyr 650TR II of 1965 to 1969 was the hottest 500 model made and a competent rally car. Giacosa was awarded the 1959 Compasso d'Oro for the Nuova 500. He was cited for his "courageous renunciation of the traditional figurative nature of the automobile through a careful re-examination of all its fundamental elements".

Fiat introduced a roomier four-seat two-door saloon in 1964, to run alongside the 600. The 850 had an 843 cc (51.4 cu in) engine and a 270 cm (110 in) increase in the wheelbase, but the specification was the same as the 600. An 850T version of the Multipla was also available the following year. Fiat also produced coupé and spyder versions using the 850 platform, with an engine producing 47 bhp (48 PS; 35 kW), later and later a 903 cc (55.1 cu in) engine with 52 bhp (53 PS; 39 kW). Over a half of a million of these were built by 1972. Spyder production had ceased by 1973. Many special versions were produced by the legion of specialist coachbuilders at work in Italy at the time. The 850 saloon and coupe models were also produced by SEAT. The 600 was discontinued by Fiat in 1970.

The "500" series was fifteen years old by 1972 when Fiat introduced their last rear-engined saloon, the Fiat 126, a four-seater the size of a BMC Mini on the wheelbase of the 500. The engine was increased in capacity to 594 cc (36.2 cu in), producing 23 bhp (23 PS; 17 kW) and a top speed of 105 km/h (65 mph). The 126 was in production before in Italy and then in Poland until 2000 and almost five million examples were produced.

=== Front wheel drive breakthrough ===
When Fiat began marketing the Fiat 128 in 1969 — with its engine and gearbox situated in an in-line, transverse front-drive layout, combined unequal drive shafts, MacPherson strut suspension and an electrically controlled radiator fan — it became the layout adopted by virtually every other manufacturer in the world for front-wheel drive. The approach of unequal drive shafts was crafted by Dante Giacosa.

This Active Tourer MPV wants to be more stable than a BMW M3, and using the Dante Giacosa-pattern front-wheel-drive layout compacts the mechanicals and saves space for people in the reduced overall length of what will surely become a production 1-series tall-sedan crossover..
– Robert Cumberford, Automobile Magazine, March, 2013

Transverse engine and gearbox front-wheel drive had been introduced to small inexpensive cars with the German DKW F1 in 1931, and made more widely popular with the British Mini. As engineered by Alec Issigonis in the Mini cars, the compact arrangement located the transmission and engine sharing a single oil sump — despite disparate lubricating requirements — and had the engine's radiator mounted to the side of the engine, but with fan blades shaped to expel heated air into the left wheel arch, and thus drawing cool rather than heated air over the engine. In various cars with front-drive configuration the whole power unit needed to be removed for many repairs, and especially for the clutch, but that did not apply to the Mini where the clutch could be removed with the power unit in-situ.

I have never considered it necessary to discuss projects in meetings with a number of other people during the phase of conception and design.
– Dante Giacosa

As engineered by Dante Giacosa, the 128 featured a transverse-mounted engine with unequal length drive shafts and (thanks to Ettore Cordiano's work) an innovative and compact clutch release mechanism — an arrangement which Fiat had strategically tested on a previous production model, the Primula, from its less market-critical subsidiary, Autobianchi.

Ready for production in 1964, the Primula featured the four-cylinder water-cooled 1,221 cc (74.5 cu in) from the Fiat 1100D mounted transversely with the four-speed gearbox located inline with the crankshaft. With a gear train to the offset differential and final drive and unequal length drive shafts. The layout enabled the engine and gearbox to be located side by side without sharing lubricating fluid while orienting the cooling fan toward fresh air flow. By using the Primula as a test-bed, Fiat was able to sufficiently resolve the layout's disadvantages, including uneven side-to-side power transmission, uneven tire wear and potential torque steer, the tendency for the power of the engine alone to steer the car under heavy acceleration.

Fiat quickly demonstrated the layout's flexibility, re-configuring the 128 drive-train as a mid-engined layout for the Fiat X1/9, and the compact, efficient layout — a transversely-mounted engine with transmission mounted beside the engine driving the front wheels through an offset final-drive and unequal-length driveshafts — subsequently became common with competitors and arguably an industry standard.

== See also ==
- Pio Manzù
