= Autobianchi A112 =

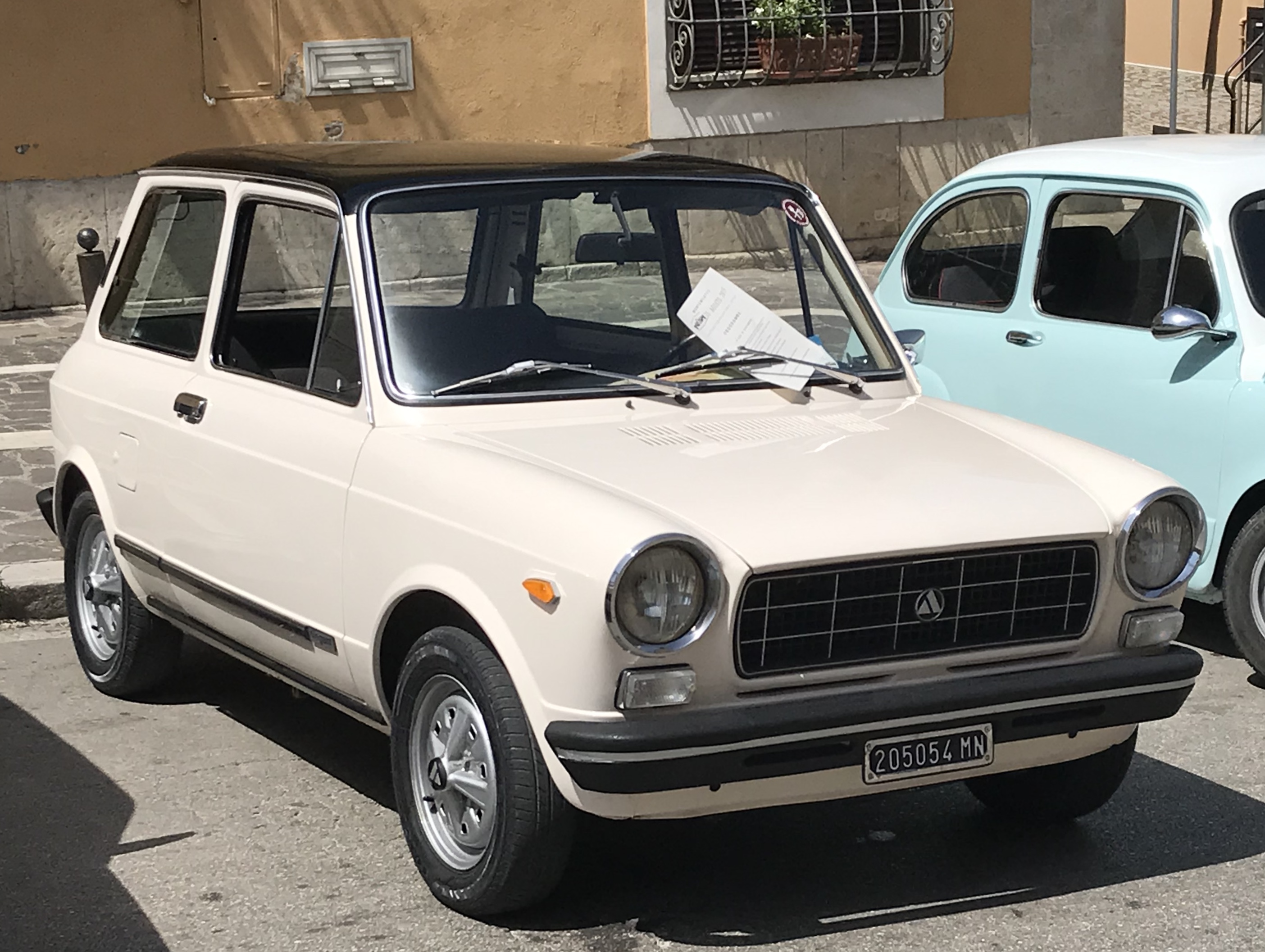

Overview
- Manufacturer: Autobianchi
- Also called: Lancia A112
- Production: October 1969–1986; 1,254,178 produced
- Assembly: Italy: Milan
- Designer: Marcello Gandini at Bertone

Body and chassis
- Class: Supermini (B)
- Body style: 3-door hatchback
- Related: Fiat 127

Powertrain
- Engine: 903 cc OHV I4; 965 cc OHV I4; 982 cc OHV I4; 1050 cc OHV I4
- Transmission: 4-speed manual 5-speed manual

Dimensions
- Wheelbase: 2,038 mm (80.2 in)
- Length: 3,230 mm (127.2 in)
- Width: 1,480 mm (58.3 in)
- Curb weight: 670 kg (1,477 lb)

Chronology
- Predecessor: Autobianchi Bianchina; Autobianchi Primula; Autobianchi Giardiniera
- Successor: Autobianchi Y10

The Autobianchi A112 is a supermini produced by the Italian automaker Autobianchi. It was developed using a shrunken version of the contemporary Fiat 128's platform. The mechanicals of the A112 subsequently underpinned the Fiat 127. It was introduced in November 1969, as a replacement for the Bianchina and Primula, and was built until 1986, when it made way for the more modern Autobianchi Y10 (branded in most export markets as the Lancia Y10). Over 1.2 million A112s were produced in Autobianchi's Milan factory.

== Engine ==
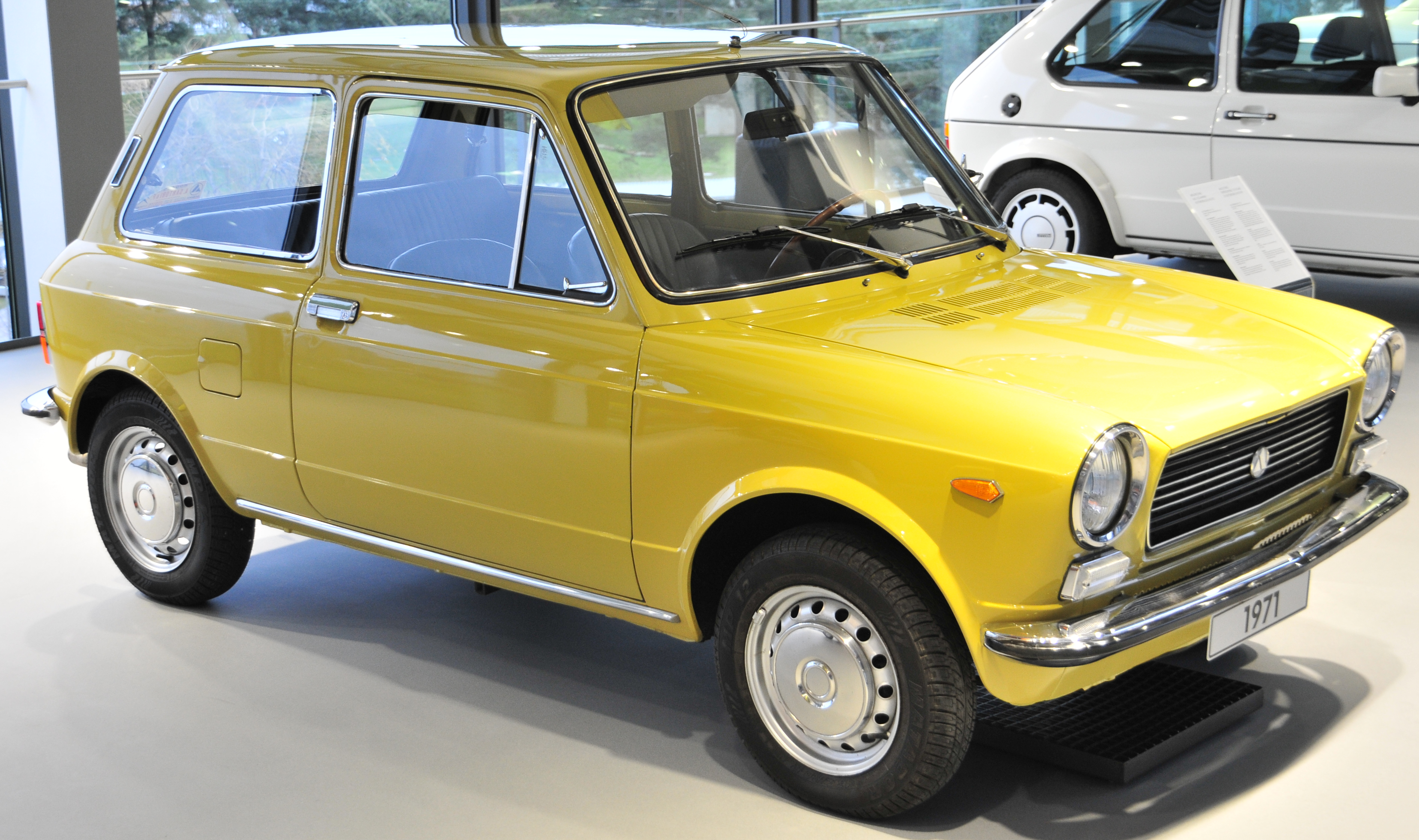
1971 Autobianchi A112 (first series)

The A112 was available only with a 3-door body. It was offered with the OHV engine of 903 cc from the Fiat 850 capable of attaining 42 PS (31 kW). The Autobianchi represented the first appearance of this engine in a front-engine, front-wheel drive configuration which would later become familiar to a wider range of drivers in the top selling Fiat 127 and its derivatives. Claimed power increased to 47 PS (35 kW) in 1971, but without any mechanical changes having taken place. Performance remained unchanged as well, this was most likely simply a correction to the claimed output.

The A112 reached a very particular market; by 1984 female buyers represented 35% of A112 owners and about a third were in the 18-24 age range.

== Developments ==
In September 1971, the A112 E ("E" for Elegant, which also became its name after the 1973 facelift) was introduced. This featured a roof painted in a contrasting colour, improved seats, higher grade trimming and equipment, as well as a five-speed gearbox later in life. The mechanics were originally identical to the regular version, now referred to as the Normale, but from 1975 until 1977 the Normale' received a less powerful engine. A performance edition "Abarth" was introduced too.

=== Second generation ===
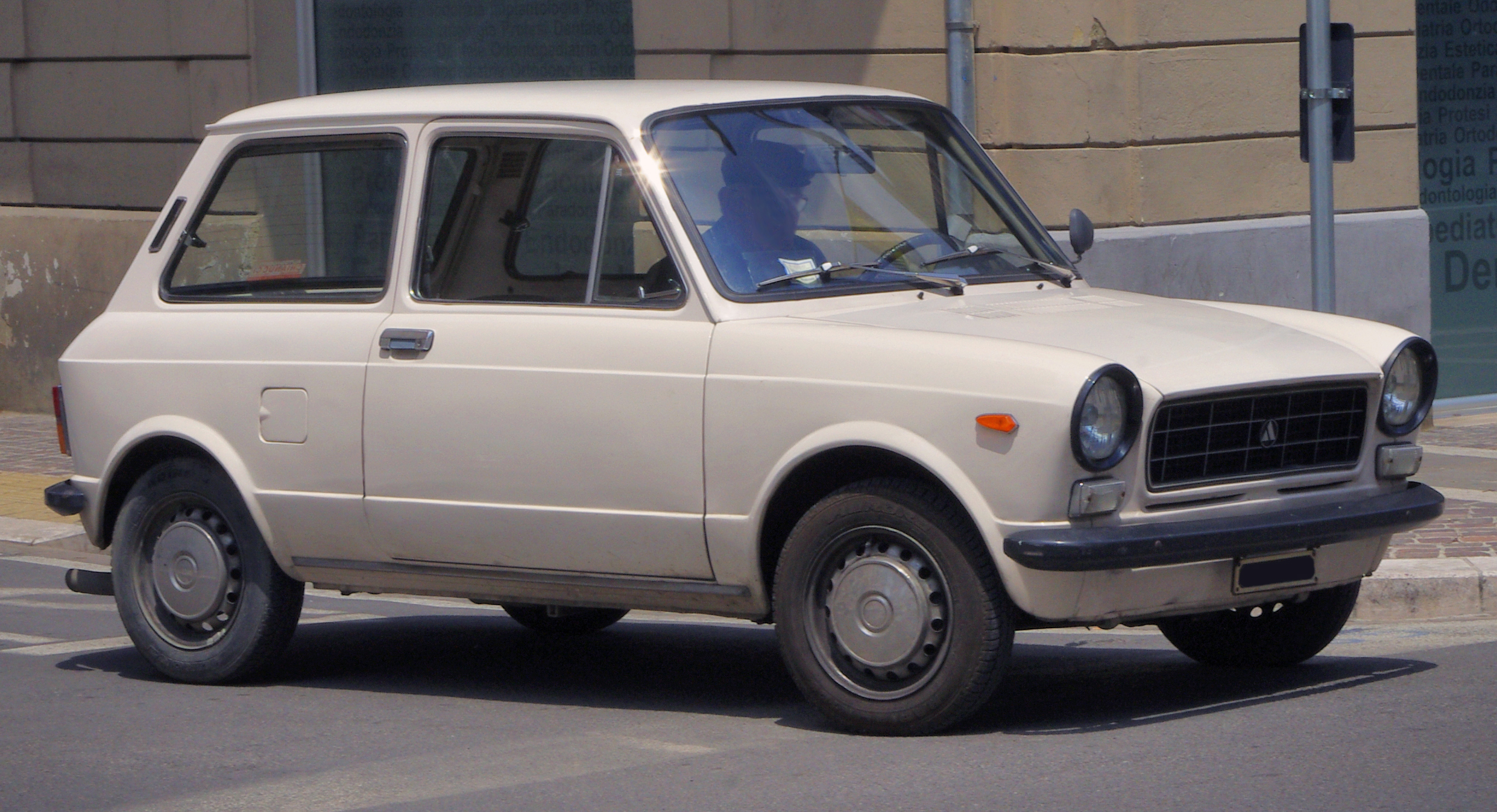
A112 Normale (second series)

In March 1973, the A112 received a makeover. The grille was new, with a larger mesh, and the bumpers were now of rubber with chrome insert (although the Normale retained the old metal bumpers with rubber strips). A new style of alloys were also available, and the seats and dashboard underwent some changes. The A112E was renamed Elegant, and was no longer only available in two-tone paintjobs. The Abarth was also available in single paints, and on two-tone models the contrasting shade was restricted to a black bonnet. The Scorpion logos on the flanks were removed, and it received a new chess pattern upholstery. Engines remained 903 cc and 982 cc for the Abarth.

=== Third generation ===
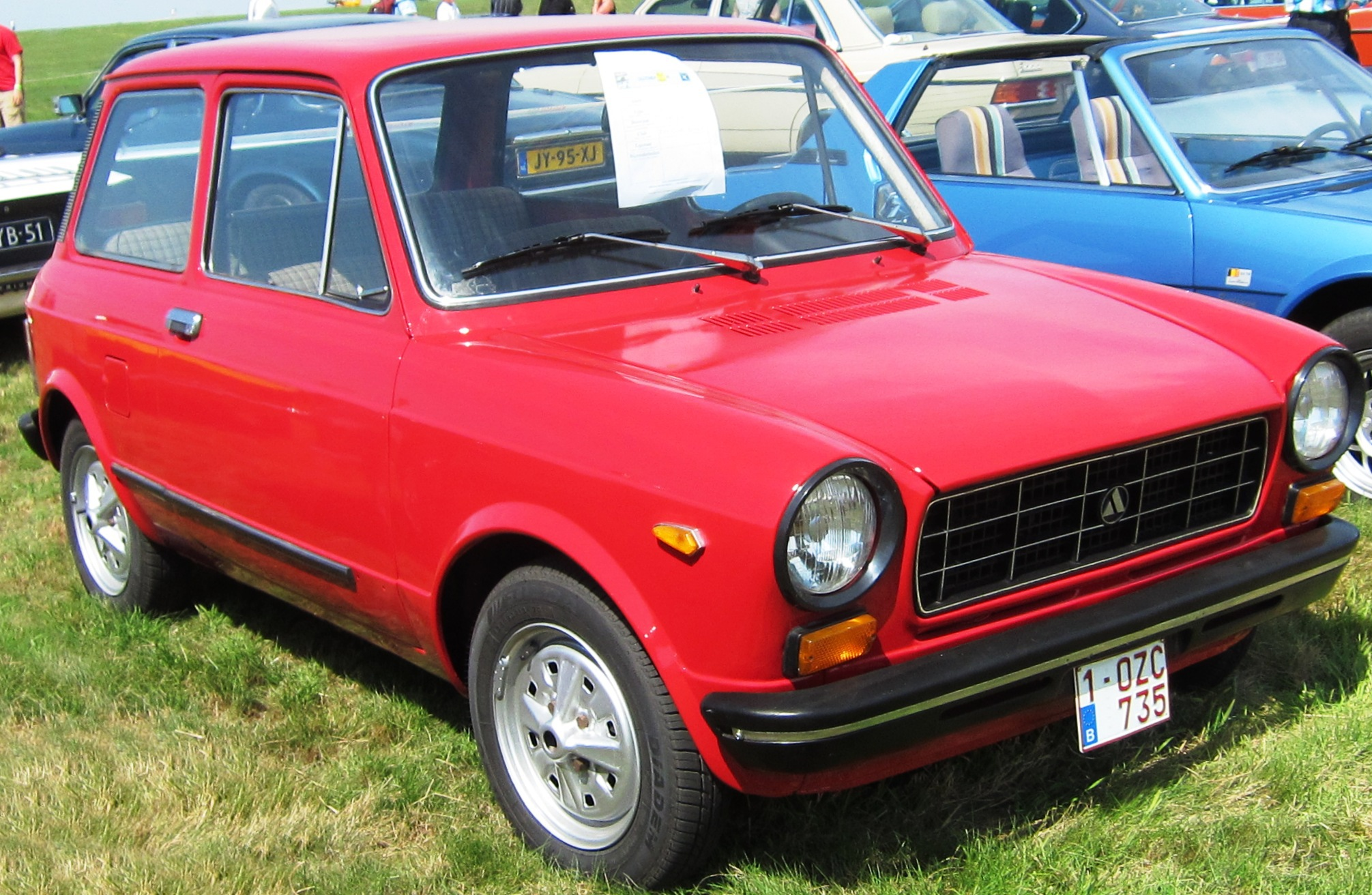
Third series A112

In 1975, the third series arrived. The insides in the rear were recontoured, so that the car now became a five-seater (instead of four). The easiest way to spot a third series is that it received new, much larger vents on the C-pillars, as well as redesigned taillights - with integrated reversing lights on the Elegant and Abarth. The Abarth also received a new larger 1050 cc engine ("70HP"), while the Normale's output dropped to 42 PS (31 kW) in July 1975. All engines were still pushrod units, derived from the old Fiat 100 series engine first introduced in the Fiat 600. In 1976, due to new emissions standards, the Elegant lost two horsepower, now down to 45 PS (33 kW). Third series Normales still received metal bumpers, but from now on they were painted black (instead of being chromed) and no longer had a rubber strip. This was the last model to have the diamond shaped turn signals on the front fenders, with later models receiving more orthodox rectangular ones. The A112 Elegant had metal bumpers with a black rubber cover over it and a strip of metal trim running horizontally across their width.

Rayton Fissore showed (and then sold) a special-bodied version of the A112 called "Gold Shadow" in 1978, with aerodynamically styled bodywork reminiscent of that of the Porsche 928.

=== Fourth generation ===
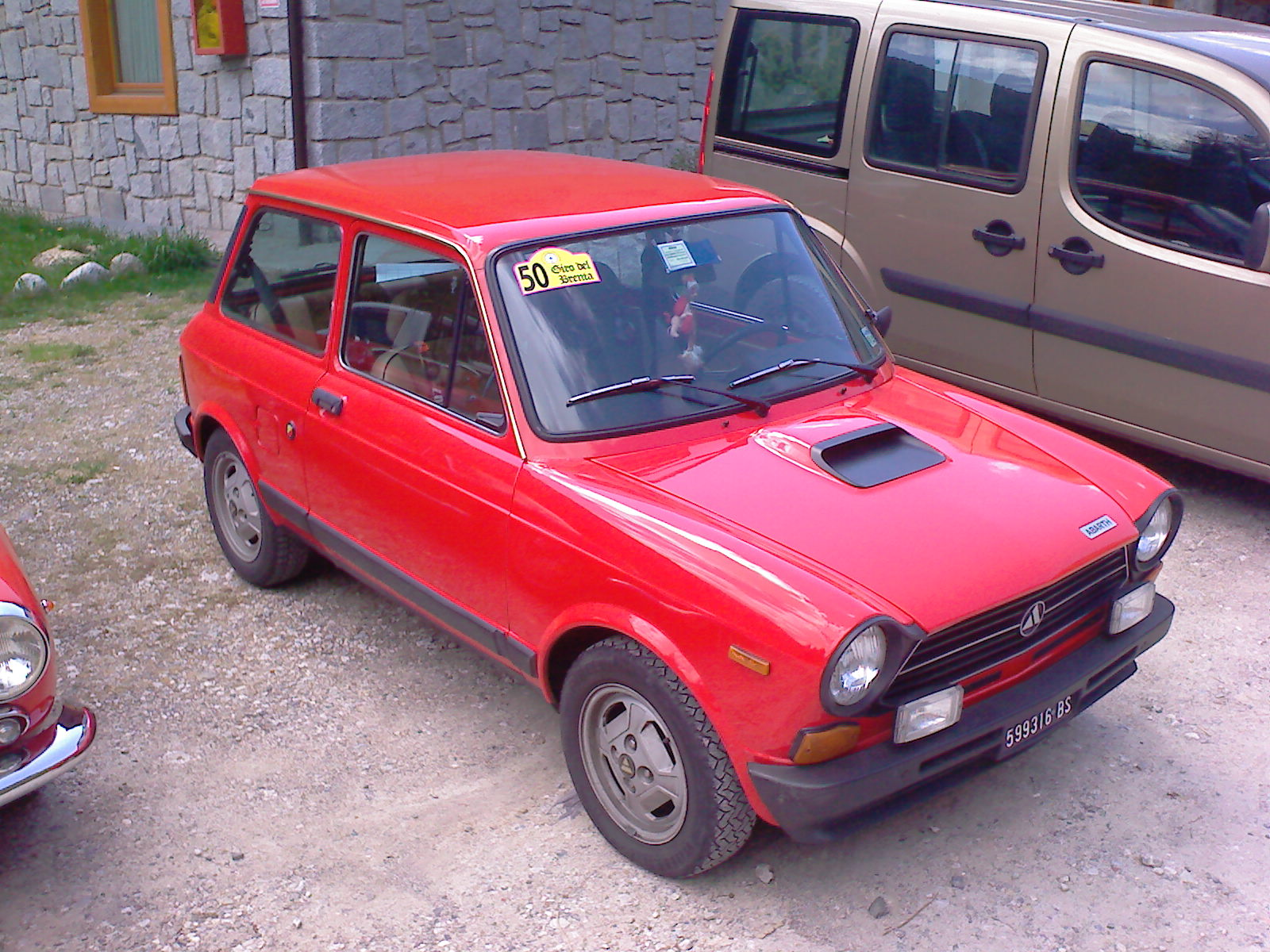
Fourth series Abarth A112

In November 1977, the "Nuova A112" (new A112) was introduced: The most obvious difference is a slightly taller roof, with a marked edge around the sides. This improved interior habitability considerably. Autobianchi also at this time modified the upmarket version branded as the "A112 Elegant" with an engine enlarged to 965 cc, now promising 48 PS (35 kW) and improved torque. The taillights of the fourth series were different (and short-lived, as they were altered again in 1979) with a stepped appearance, taller towards the outside of the car and narrower towards the center.

Later, there were also "A112 Elite" and "A112 LX" versions which received even more comfortable equipment. The 903 cc engine of the lesser A112 Normale remained unchanged. Beginning in March 1979, French and Swiss market A112 Abarths came equipped with a standard five-speed transmission, helping lower noise and fuel consumption, especially at higher speeds.

Starting from the end of 1977 this car was also badged as Lancia A112 in some markets outside of Italy.

=== Fifth generation ===
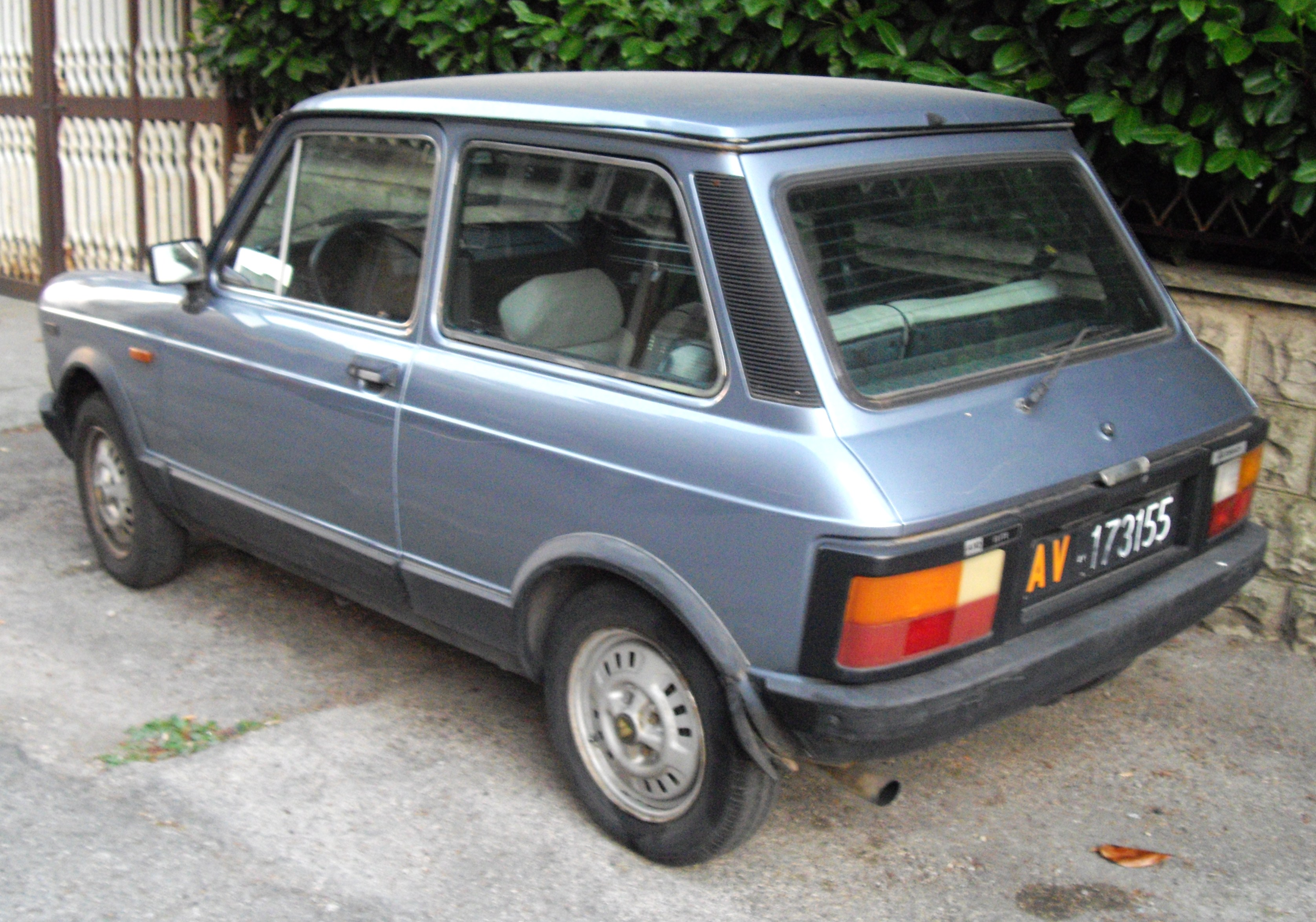
A112 Elite of the fifth series

In July 1979, the car underwent another styling modification, receiving large black plastic cladding on the rear, surrounding new taillights, and new side trim and bumpers. The grille was also new, and there was black plastic wheelarches to link all of the plastic parts together. The extractor vents behind the rear side windows were also larger, of black plastic, and wrapped around the pillar. In terms of transmissions, the five-speed transmission already seen in Abarths in some markets now became available on additional models. The fifth gear was an overgear, while the ratios of the four lower speeds and the final gearing remained unchanged. The front turn signals were moved from the front of the fenders to a spot just in front of the leading edge of the doors, while a small badge denoting the trim level appeared in the turn signal's old place.

In terms of trim levels, the Normale now became the Junior, and the Elite version was added, a notch above the Elegant in the lineup. There were some very light modifications to the interior. A large, rollback canvas sunroof became available on the Junior, and a rear window wiper became optional across the range. Aside from the new transmission there were no notable mechanical changes. Power outputs remained at 42, 48, and 70 PS (31, 35.5, and 51.5 kW respectively). The Abarth also received the new five-speed gearbox, as well as new alloy wheels and foglights as standard.

=== Sixth generation ===
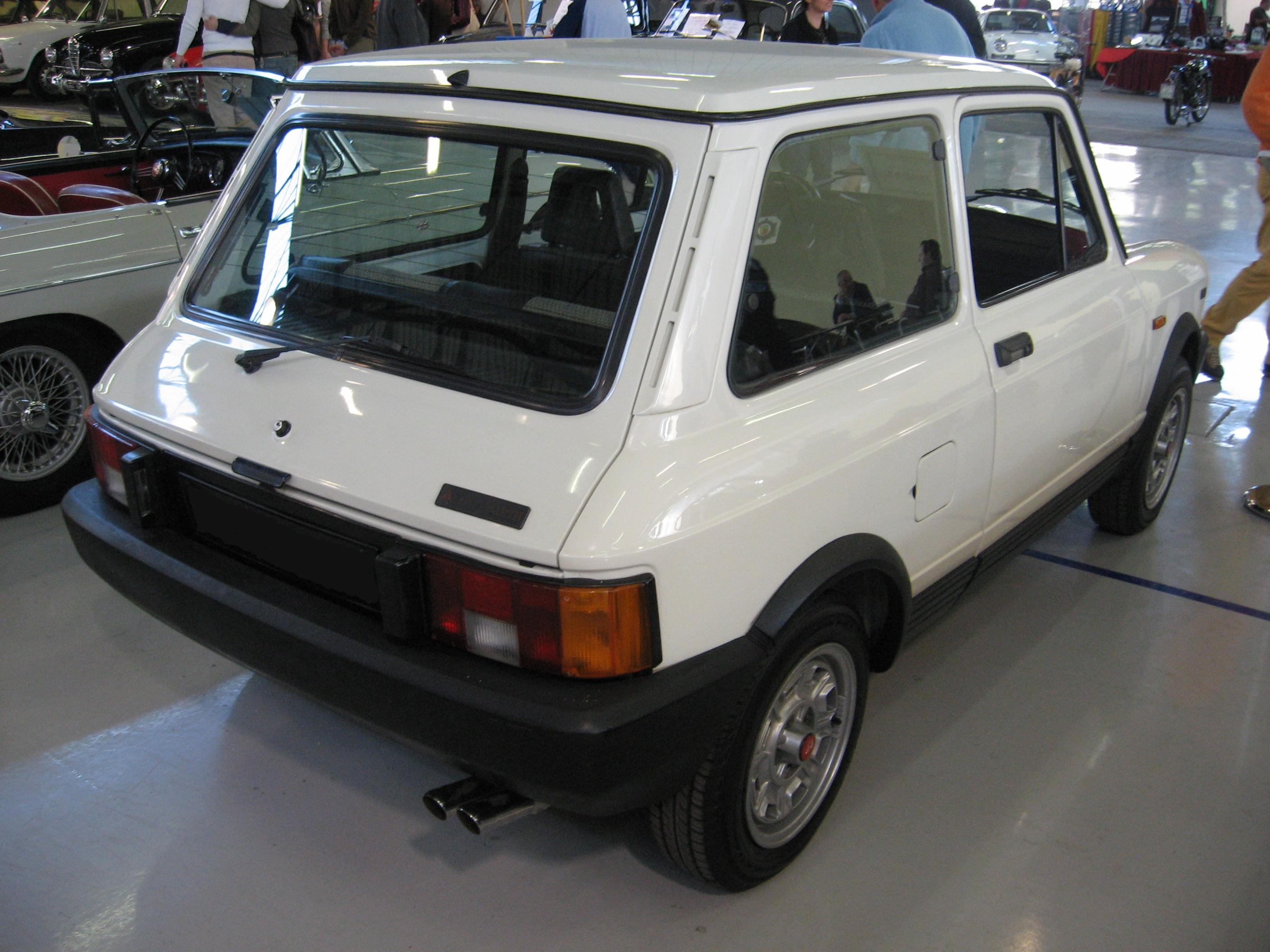
A112 Abarth of the sixth series

A lot of the plastic excesses of the fifth series were reversed for the sixth series, which was introduced in the autumn of 1982. New smoother bumpers, removal of the wheelarch trim, and a less heavy grille treatment brought back some of the original elegance of the A112, while the interior was also completely renovated. Another new version arrived, the top-of-the-line LX, which featured tinted windows, velvet seat trimming, power windows, metallic paintwork, and a digital clock amongst other creature comforts. Mechanically, the LX was identical to the Elite, with the five-speed transmission and 965 cc engine. The Elegant version was discontinued, with the Elite taking its position in the lineup. The sixth series also received new body-colored vents on the C-pillar, and the front corner lights were incorporated into the top of the bumper.

This was the first A112 to be marketed with Lancia badging, originally only in Sweden and in Switzerland. In Sweden, this car had already been sold by Lancia dealers with "Autobianchi" badging. In the Swiss and Swedish markets, the 903 cc engine no longer passed their stricter emissions standards, so the Junior received the same 965 cc engine as did the Elite and LX.

=== Seventh generation ===
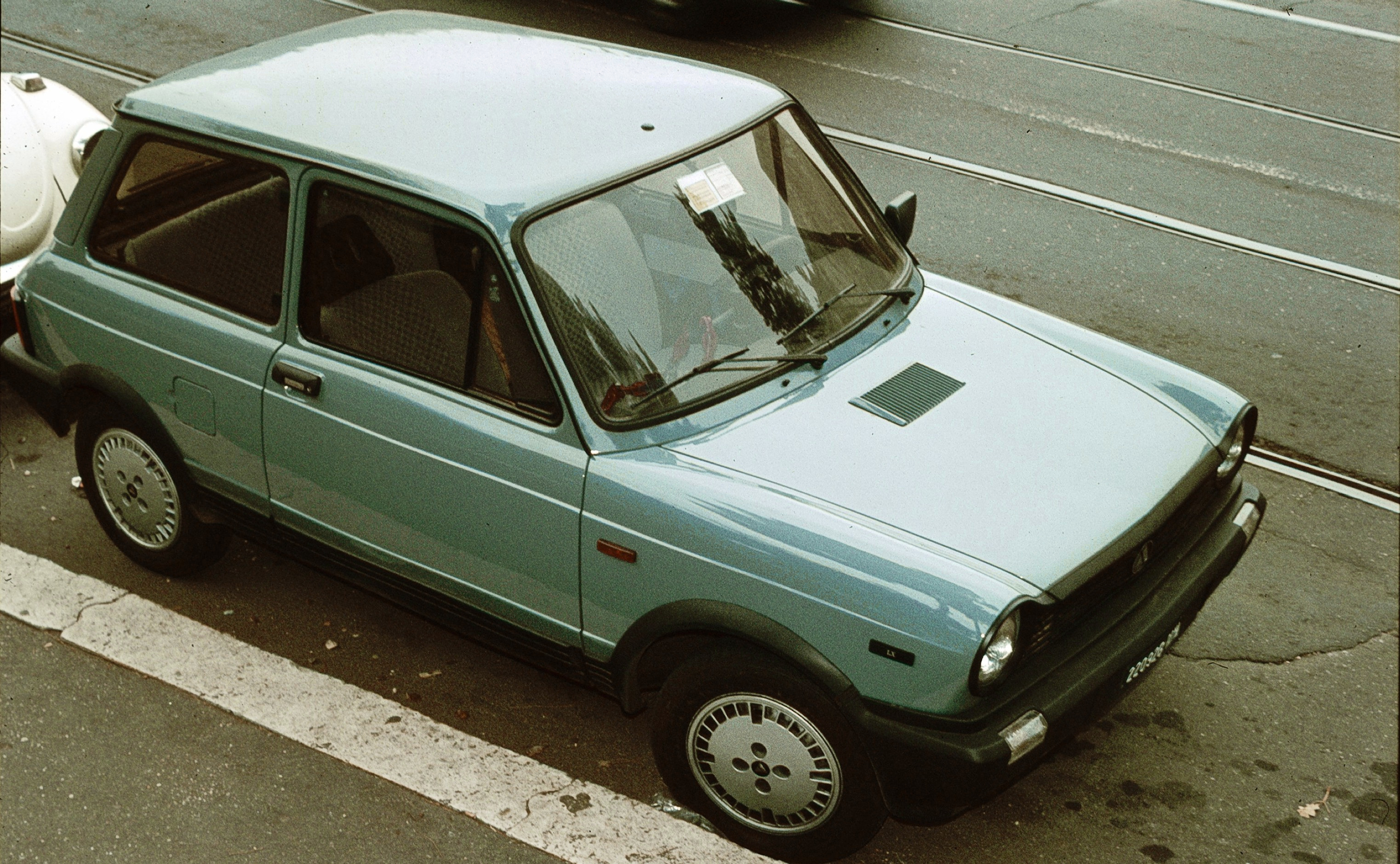
A112 LX (seventh series)

The seventh series, presented in 1984, only saw minor changes, largely remaining the same as the sixth. The taillights were again redesigned and were now joined by a reflective strip. The rear license plate was relocated to the bumper and the dashboard received modifications, more noticeable in the better equipped Elite and LX versions. The Abarth received standard front foglights, which were optional on the other versions. The Abarth also has red seatbelts. While the Junior retained small hubcaps, and the Abarth received alloys, the rest of the range now received full-face hubcaps. The front corner lights were now white, instead of orange as before. The engines remained as before, all models except the lowest-priced Junior now used five-speed transmissions.

By this time, only France, Italy and Israel still used the "Autobianchi" badge; all others had switched to calling the car a Lancia. At the time of the seventh series introduction, a total of 1,115,000 A112s had been built.

=== Eighth generation ===
As the new Autobianchi Y10 was introduced in 1985, the A112 range was cut down considerably, with only the Junior remaining on sale as a low-priced alternative. It was no longer called Junior, however, now being marketed simply as the "Autobianchi A112". Other than the name change, there were no design changes to the car. Production continued into 1986, at which point 1,254,178 Autobianchi A112s had been built.

== A112 Abarth ==
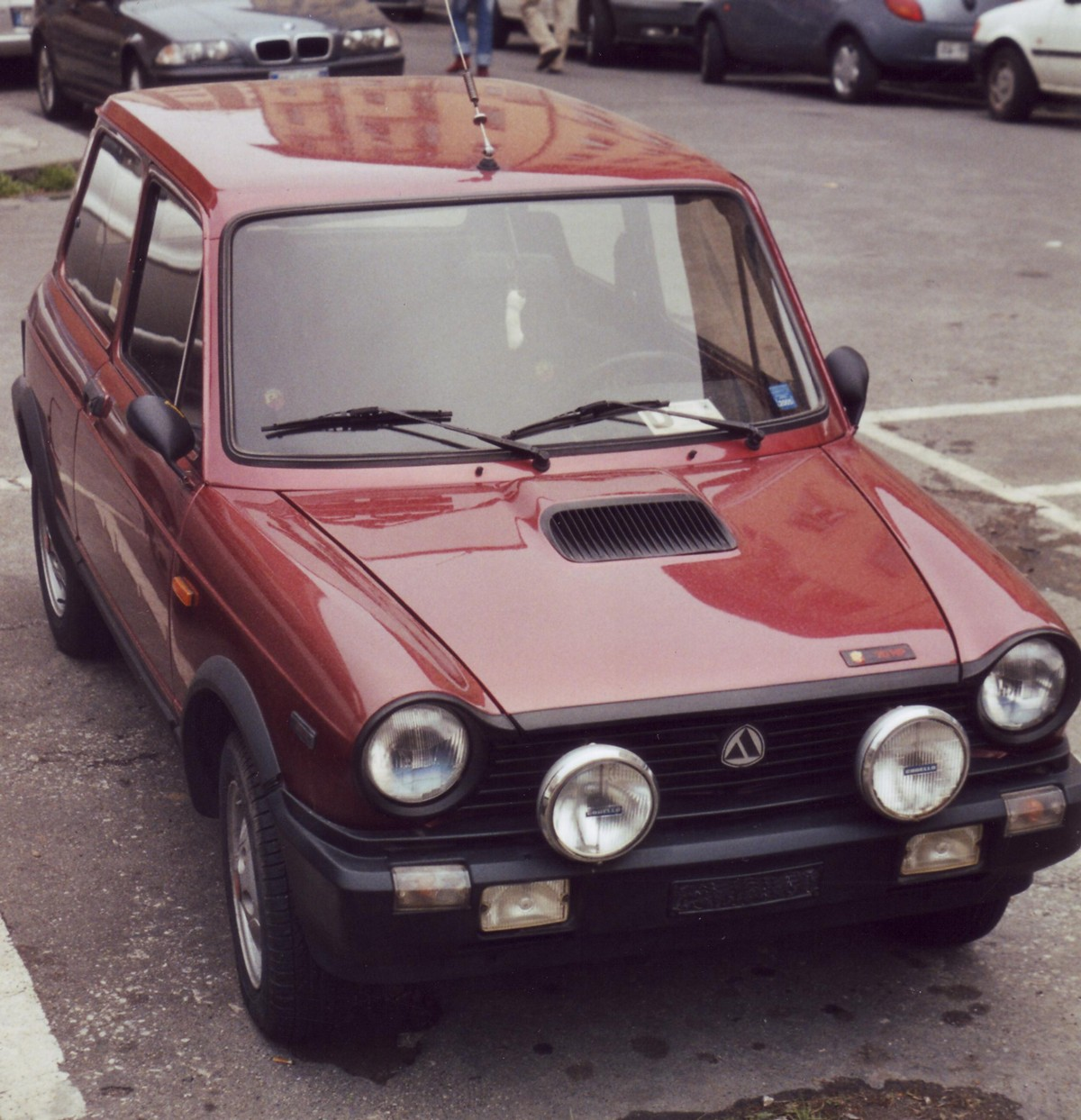
Autobianchi A112 Abarth 70HP.

The sportiest version was the A112 Abarth, introduced in September 1971 at the same time as the Elegant. It was prepared by the motorsports division of the Fiat Group, at first with a 982 cc engine, obtained by increasing the stroke, coupled to a sporting exhaust, a twin-choke carburetor, and a different camshaft. In 1975, displacement was increased to 1,050 cc, while power climbed from 58 PS (43 kW) to 70 PS (51 kW) at 6600 rpm, weighing only 700 kg (1,543 lb). The two engines were offered in parallel until production of the smaller unit ended in late 1976. The 1975 model was also the first A112 to use a (optional) five-speed manual gearbox. These changes turned the A112 into a nervous machine, much admired by young performance enthusiasts.

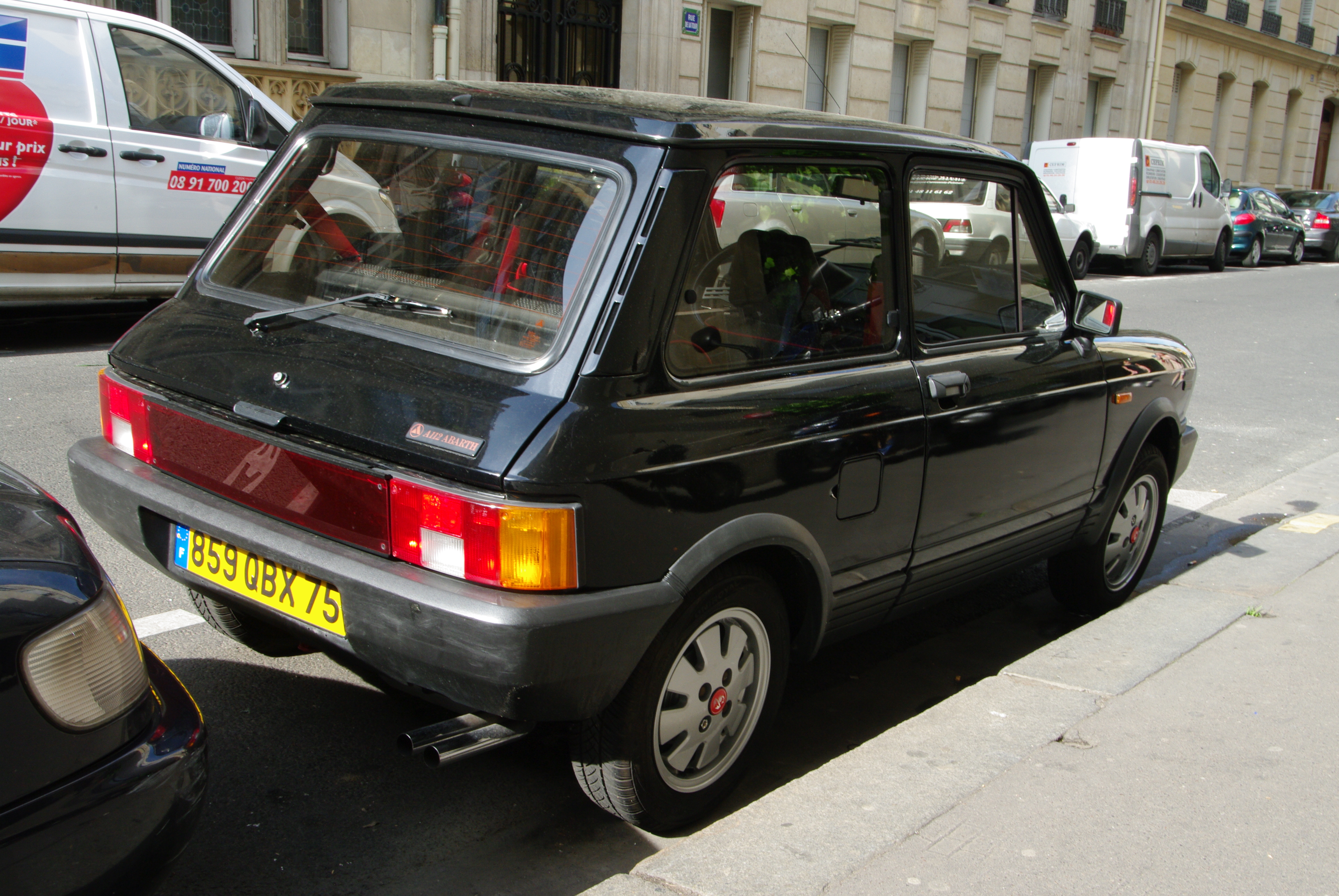
A112 Abarth rear view, seventh series.

The car was entered in various rallying events throughout Europe and even spawned a one-make trophy: the Campionato A112 Abarth spanned eight editions, from 1977 to 1984, and adopted contemporary Group 1 rules, which meant nearly-stock cars. Some famous Italian rally drivers, including Attilio Bettega, Fabrizio Tabaton and Gianfranco Cunico, were among the winners of the championship. The increasing popularity of the A112 in historic rallies and hillclimbs led to the reintroduction of a one-make trophy, called Trofeo A112 Abarth, in 2010. Abarths have often led hard lives, having been preferred by young owners with aggressive driving styles. Formula One driver Olivier Panis is one of many to have crashed an A112 Abarth.

== A112 Giovani ==
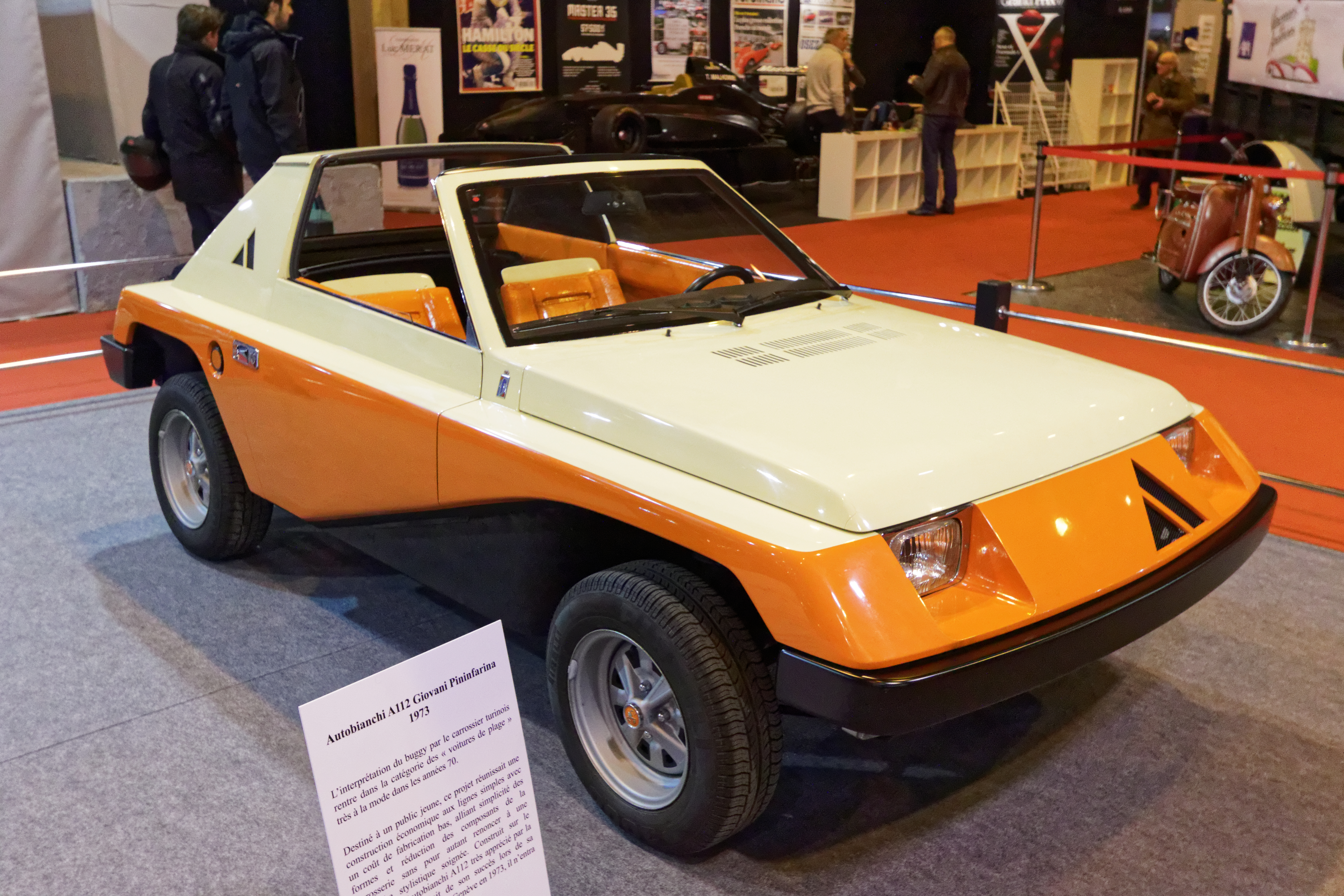
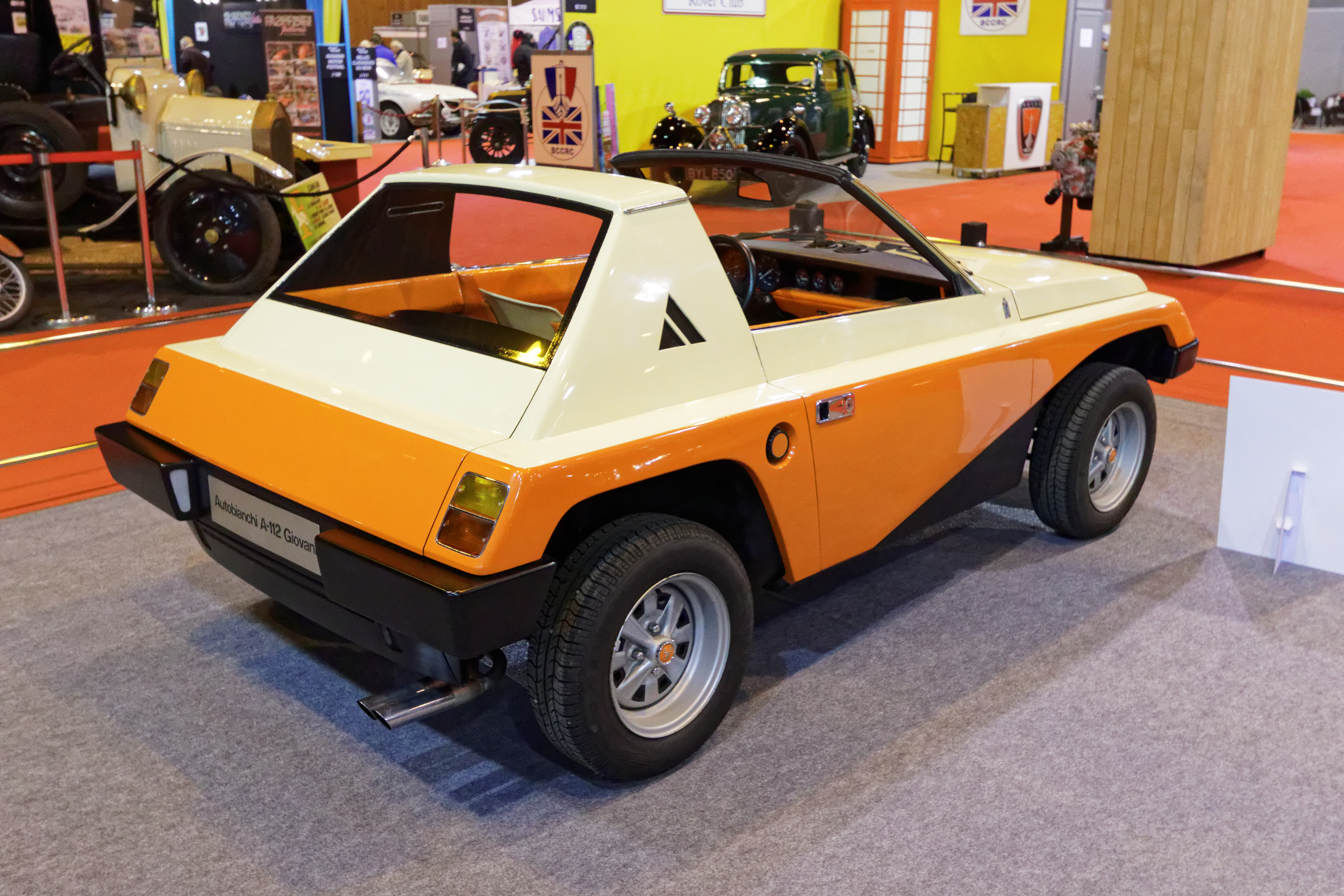
The Autobianchi A112 Giovani concept car exhibited in Paris at the Rétromobile auto show of 2015.

The A112 Giovani is a one-off concept car based on the A112 and designed by Diego Ottina at Pininfarina. It debuted in 1973 at the Geneva Motor Show. It is based mostly on standard A112 mechanicals but is powered by the 982 cc Abarth engine from the A112 Abarth producing 58 bhp (43 kW) and 54 lb⋅ft (73 N⋅m) of torque. The car was named "Giovani", the Italian word for youth, as it was designed as an entry level, sporty car for younger buyers. Unlike the standard A112, the Giovani features a targa roof design with a removable plastic hardtop roof and an integrated roll bar behind the seats. The body is made mainly from composite plastics and features integrated bumpers, as well as a radiator grille in the shape of the Autobianchi logo. It also does not have a latch on the trunk lid, with the trunk latch only being accessible via the passenger compartment. The interior features a plastic dashboard and metal seat frames with seats made from the same semi-soft plastics often used in boats. The A112 Giovani is currently owned by Italian collector Corrado Lopresto, who also owns the Lancia Sibilo and Lancia Stola S81 concepts.

== Generations ==
- First series: October 1969 – March 1973
- Second series: March 1973 – early 1975
- Third series: early 1975 – November 1977
- Fourth series: November 1977 – 1979 (Nuova A112)
- Fifth series: 1979–1982
- Sixth series: 1982–1984 (now sold also as Lancia A112 in most markets)
- Seventh series: 1984–1985
- Eighth series: 1985–1986 (only basic model available)

== Competition ==
The A112 was the first modern three-door supermini hatchback to be produced in Europe, arriving 18 months before the more successful Fiat 127. At the time of its launch, its main competitors were booted smaller cars including the Mini, Citroën 2CV, Renault 4 and Hillman Imp. However, the 1970s saw the arrival of a host of small cars (mostly hatchbacks) which met the growing demand for "supermini" type cars in the mould of the A112. A year after the launch of the Fiat 127 came the Renault 5. Within a few years, the A112 had gained a host of other competitors including the Ford Fiesta, Peugeot 104, Vauxhall Chevette and Volkswagen Polo, as well as Japanese offerings, the most popular of which in Europe was the Datsun Cherry. This type of car proved hugely popular all over Europe. Despite its popularity on continental markets, it was never offered in Britain, although Fiat did enjoy considerable success there with its 127 and even more so with its Uno successor from 1983. However, its successor the Y10 (sold in Britain as a Lancia), was available in right-hand drive for the British market from 1985. The Y10 was not a strong seller there.
