= Puch 500 =

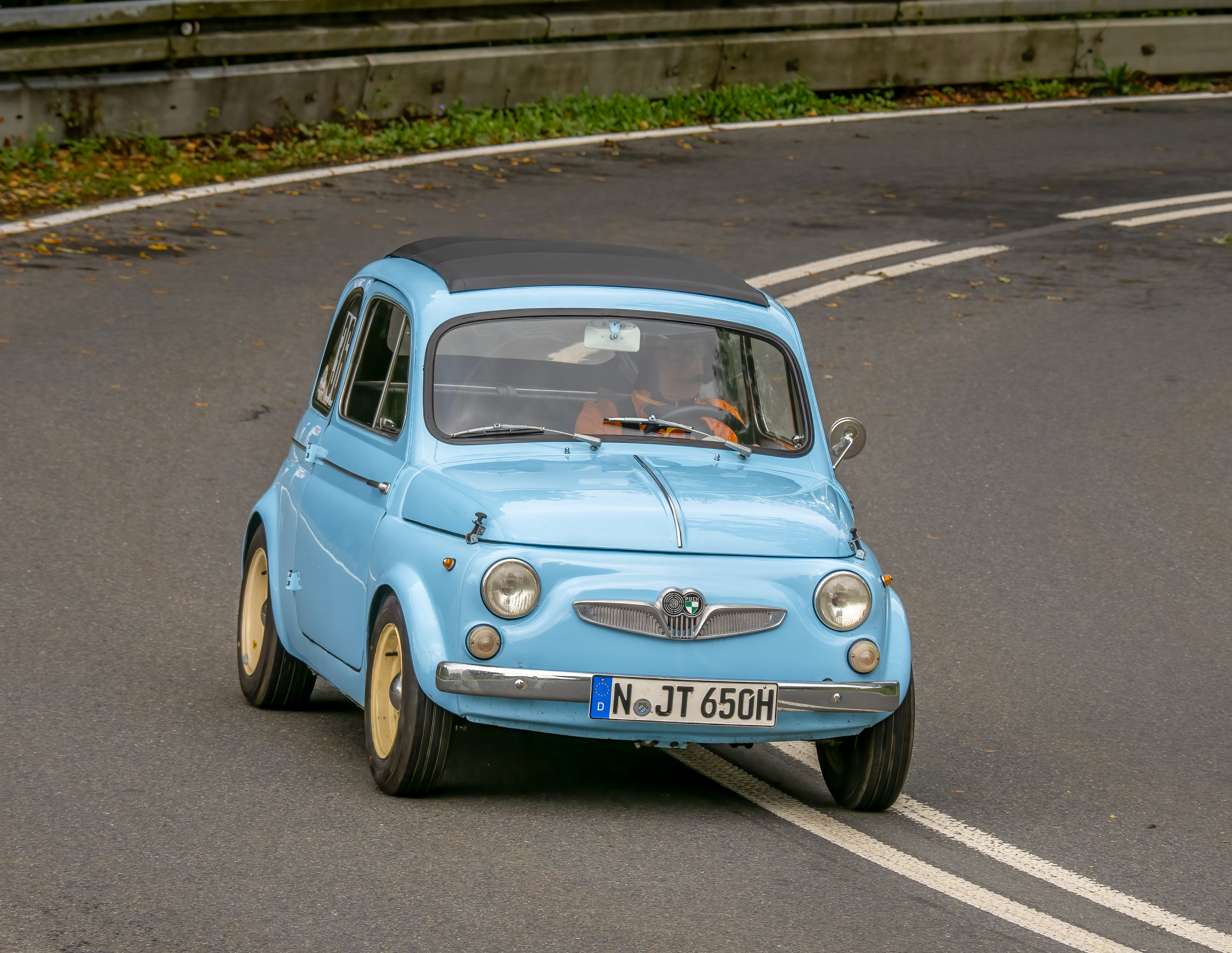

Overview
- Manufacturer: Puch
- Also called: Fiat 500
- Production: 1957–1975
- Assembly: Graz, Austria

Body and chassis
- Class: City car (A)
- Body style: 2-door saloon; 3-door estate
- Layout: Rear-engine, rear-wheel drive
- Related: Fiat 500; Autobianchi Bianchina; NSU/Fiat Weinsberg 500; Vignale Gamine

Powertrain
- Engine: 493 cc 2-cylinder flat engine; 643 cc; 660 cc
- Transmission: 4-speed manual

Dimensions
- Wheelbase: 1,840 mm (72.4 in)
- Length: 2,970–3,054 mm (116.9–120.2 in)
- Width: 1,320–1,374 mm (52.0–54.1 in)
- Height: 1,302–1,325 mm (51.3–52.2 in)
- Curb weight: 470–580 kg (1,036.2–1,278.7 lb)

Chronology
- Successor: Steyr Puch Fiat 126

The Puch 500 was a city car produced by the Austrian manufacturer Puch, a subsidiary of Steyr-Daimler-Puch in Graz. It was built under licence from Fiat and was based on the Fiat 500.

== The beginning ==
In 1954 it was decided at Steyr-Puch to resume car production after the war. Because of the high costs associated with the development of a completely new design, an agreement was made with Fiat to acquire and adapt the body in white of their Nuova 500 (Italian: Cinquecento) model designed by Dante Giacosa. Of the body, only the engine cover and later the roof was produced in-house. Engine, transmission and carriage were all manufactured by Steyr-Puch. The engine was a two-cylinder (16 hp/12 kW) flat engine which proved to be far more smooth-running than the straight-twin engine used by Fiat. It brought good driving behaviour for its time, especially in mountain rides. The Italians too had experimented mounting this engine to their car originally, but it was dropped in favor of the simpler in-line twin.

The first Steyr-Puch 500 Modell Fiat was launched in 1957 and sold well. At first it was offered with a folding roof only, and it was expected to draw in motorcyclists as a buying audience. The Puchwagen or Pucherl, as it was called, was the official car for the Austrian AA-service.

== Development ==
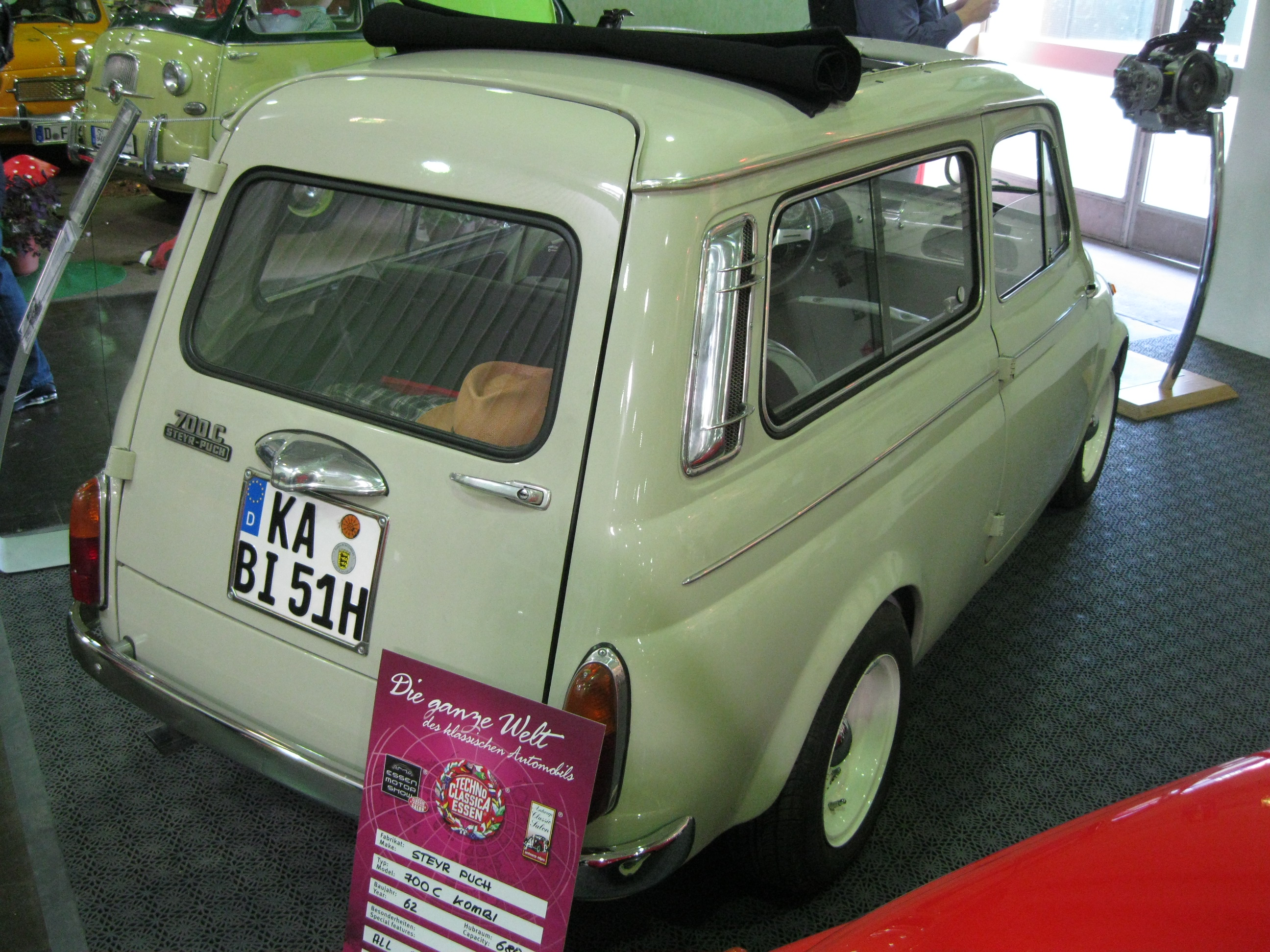
Puch 700 C estate

In 1959 came the first revision. The model Steyr-Puch 500 D was provided with the metal roof produced by Fiat (D for Dach, i.e. "roof" in German), and in addition to that the luxury model 500 DL was equipped with a stronger engine (20 hp/15 kW). 1961 saw the launch of two estate models, 700 C (C for Combi) and 700 E (E for Economy), both featuring a larger 643 cc engine but with different power ratings. In 1962 the sedan, too, was equipped with the larger engine, leading to the 650 T (T for Thondorf, the location of the manufacturing plant in Graz).

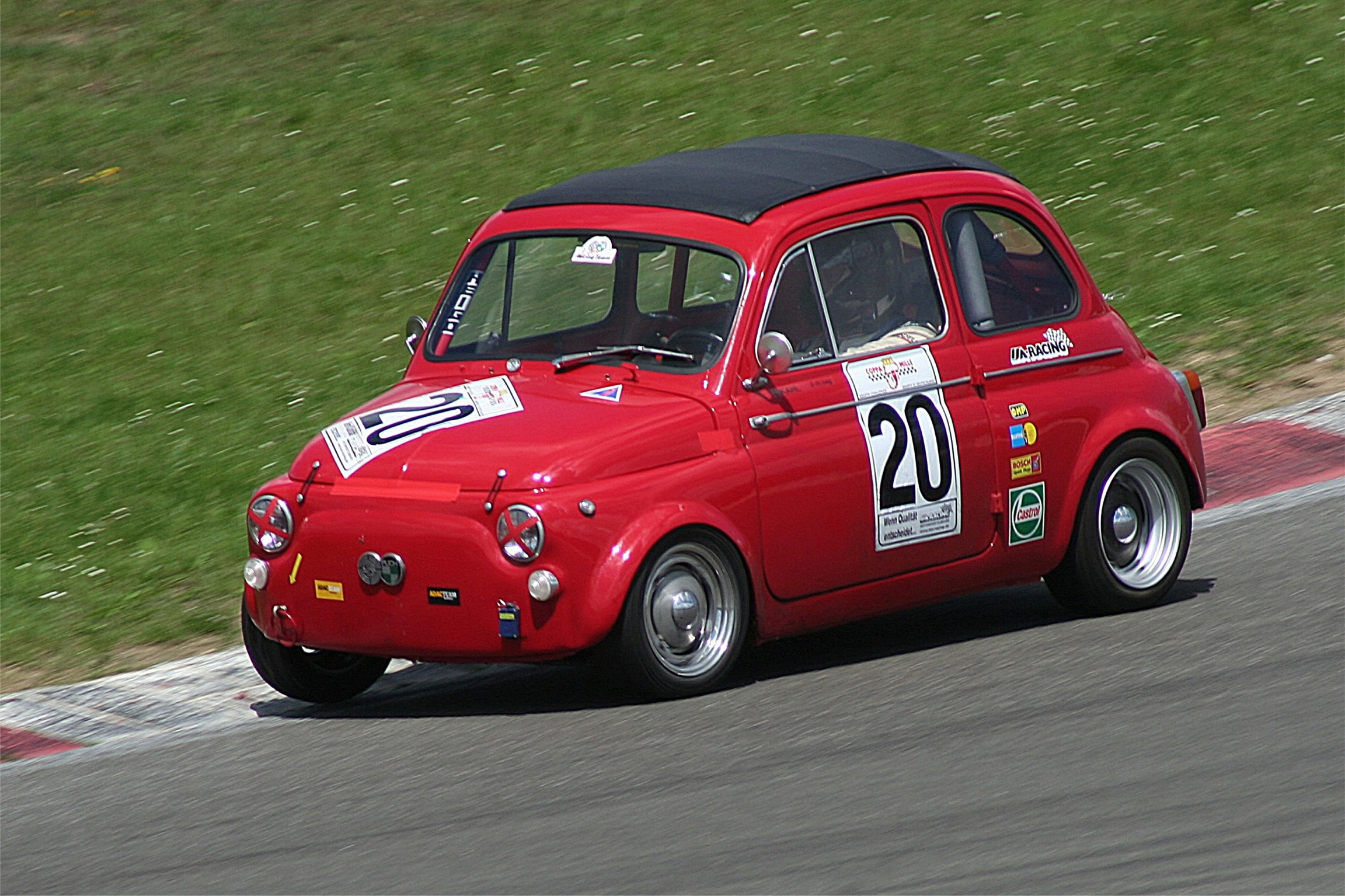
1964 Steyr-Puch 650 TR at the DAMC 05 oldtimer festival, Nürburgring

A few years later the engine was boosted even more, resulting in the models 650 TR and 650 TR II (R for Rallye) – models at first intended for police use, but later also offered as standard. Going through homologation in the Group 2 racing class, they successfully participated in motorsport events, competing with its Abarth sister models. In 1966 the Polish driver Sobiesław Zasada won the European Rally Championship with a Steyr-Puch 650 TR II, the smallest vehicle ever to achieve such victory. Gerard van Lennep won the Production Cars Championship (up to 700 cc.) of the Netherlands in 1966 and 1967 with a yellow 650 TR. He also competed in European Cup races, winning in Belgrade.

The body and outfit had remained more or less the same, until in 1967 the modified Fiat 500 design introduced in 1965 was adopted in Graz. The most essential new feature were the front hinged doors as opposed to the former suicide doors. At the same time, the roof was adopted from Fiat. The new models were given the additional label "Europa". In 1969, due to decreasing demand, it was decided to adopt not only the body but the complete drivetrain minus engine from Fiat. The engine was the only unit remaining under local manufacture and the model was now called 500 S (Sport).

In 1960, 20-year-old recent design school graduate Werner Hölbl designed a handsome italianate coupé bodywork for the Puch 500. It is referred to as the Steyr Puch Adria TS, the Puch Adria TS, or also Steyr-Puch 700 Sport-Coupé. One example was presented to Gianni Agnelli who was visiting Austria, as series production was hoped for, but it never materialized and only 18 examples were built. The cars built were finished mostly by hand in Hölbl's father's bodyshop - the first few cars in Klagenfurt but most of them after a move to Vienna. To improve the proportions of the car, the longer chassis of the 700 C estate. It was also equipped with the larger engine (called a "700"), but tuned to 28 PS (21 kW), and there was also a Super Sport model with 32 PS (24 kW) listed in a period advertisement.

In 1973, Fiat's successor model, the 126, was adopted in Graz. Here, too, Puch restricted themselves essentially to fitting a Puch flat engine in the otherwise nearly finished car. As early as 1975, production was stopped due to diminishing demand.

The small car sold well, with around 60,000 units produced between 1957 and 1975. Despite restrictive licensing terms from Fiat, quite a few cars were distributed outside Austria, most of them in Germany and Hungary, as well as in Finland, imported by Sisu Auto.

Type	Production year	cc	Power
500	1957–1959	493	16 hp (12 kW)
500 D	1959–1967	493	16 hp (12 kW)
500 DL	1959–1962	493	20 hp (15 kW)
700 C (Combi)	1961–1968	643	25 hp (18 kW)
700 E (Combi)	1961–1968	643	20 hp (15 kW)
650 T	1962–1968	643	20 hp (15 kW)
650 TR	1964–1968	660	27 hp (20 kW)
650 TR II	1965–1969	660	41 hp (30 kW)
500 S	1967–1973	493	20 hp (15 kW)
126	1973–1975	643	25 hp (19 kW)

Year	Production figures	Model 500	700 C	650 (T/TR)	700E	500 New	500S	126
1957	1,087	1,087	0	0	0	0	0	0
1958	7,873	7,873	0	0	0	0	0	0
1959	8,334	8,334	0	0	0	0	0	0
1960	7,911	7,906	5	0	0	0	0	0
1961	8,221	4,911	3,310	0	0	0	0	0
1962	6,096	3,628	1,059	1,113	296	0	0	0
1963	5,882	2,376	1,324	1,968	214	0	0	0
1964	3,283	1,331	1,033	918	1	0	0	0
1965	2,383	979	722	682	0	0	0	0
1966	1,541	620	557	364	0	0	0	0
1967	1,211	0	377	343	0	491	0	0
1968	689	0	179	186	0	324	0	0
1969	1,144	0	0	0	0	407	737	0
1970	1,172	0	0	0	0	314	858	0
1971	650	0	0	0	0	180	470	0
1972	381	0	0	0	0	100	281	0
1973	329	0	0	0	0	0	13	316
1974	1,468	0	0	0	0	0	0	1,468
1975	284	0	0	0	0	0	0	284
1976	1	0	0	0	0	0	0	1
Sum	59,940	39,045	8,566	5,574	511	1,816	2,359	2,069

== Gallery ==
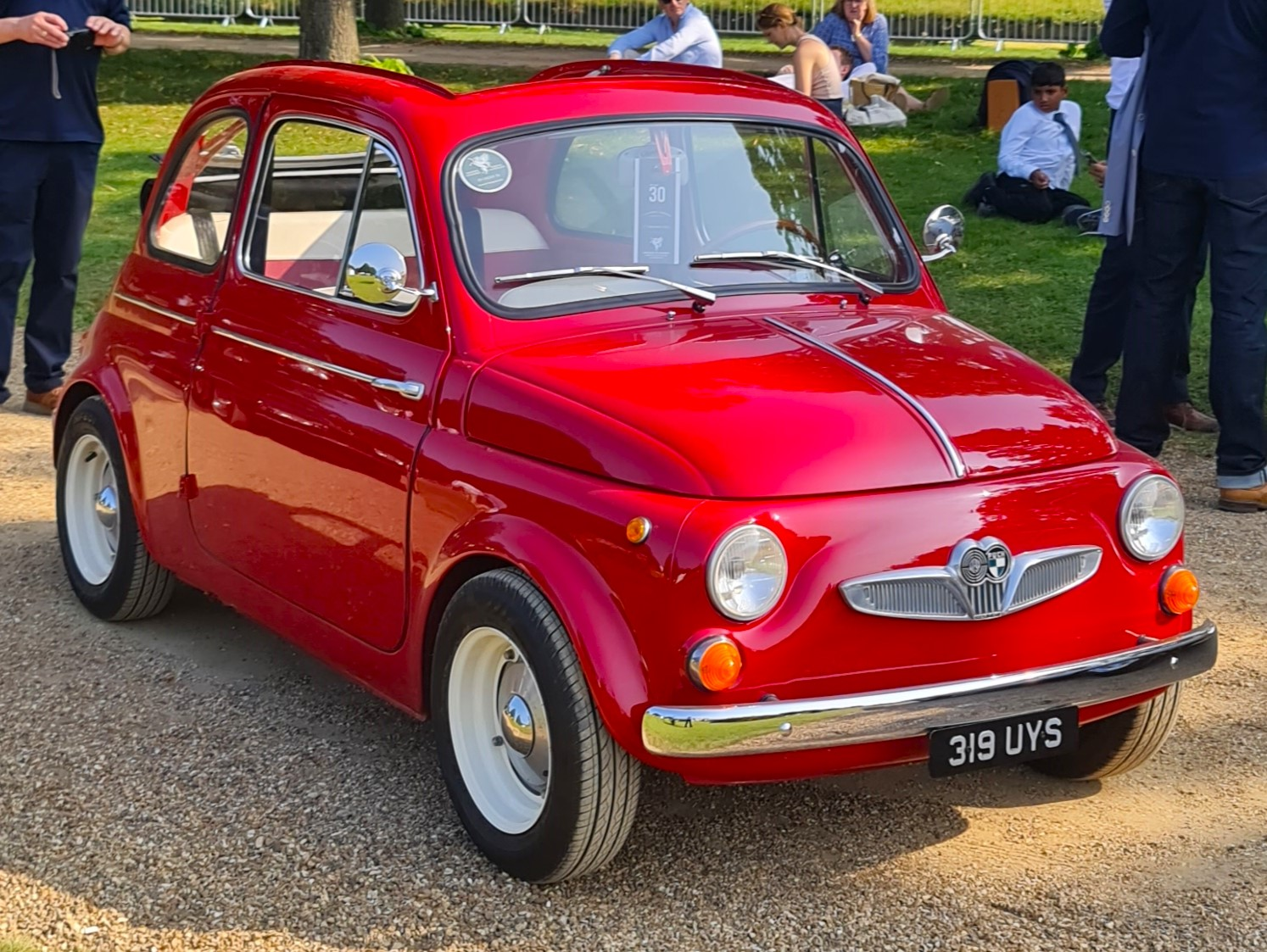

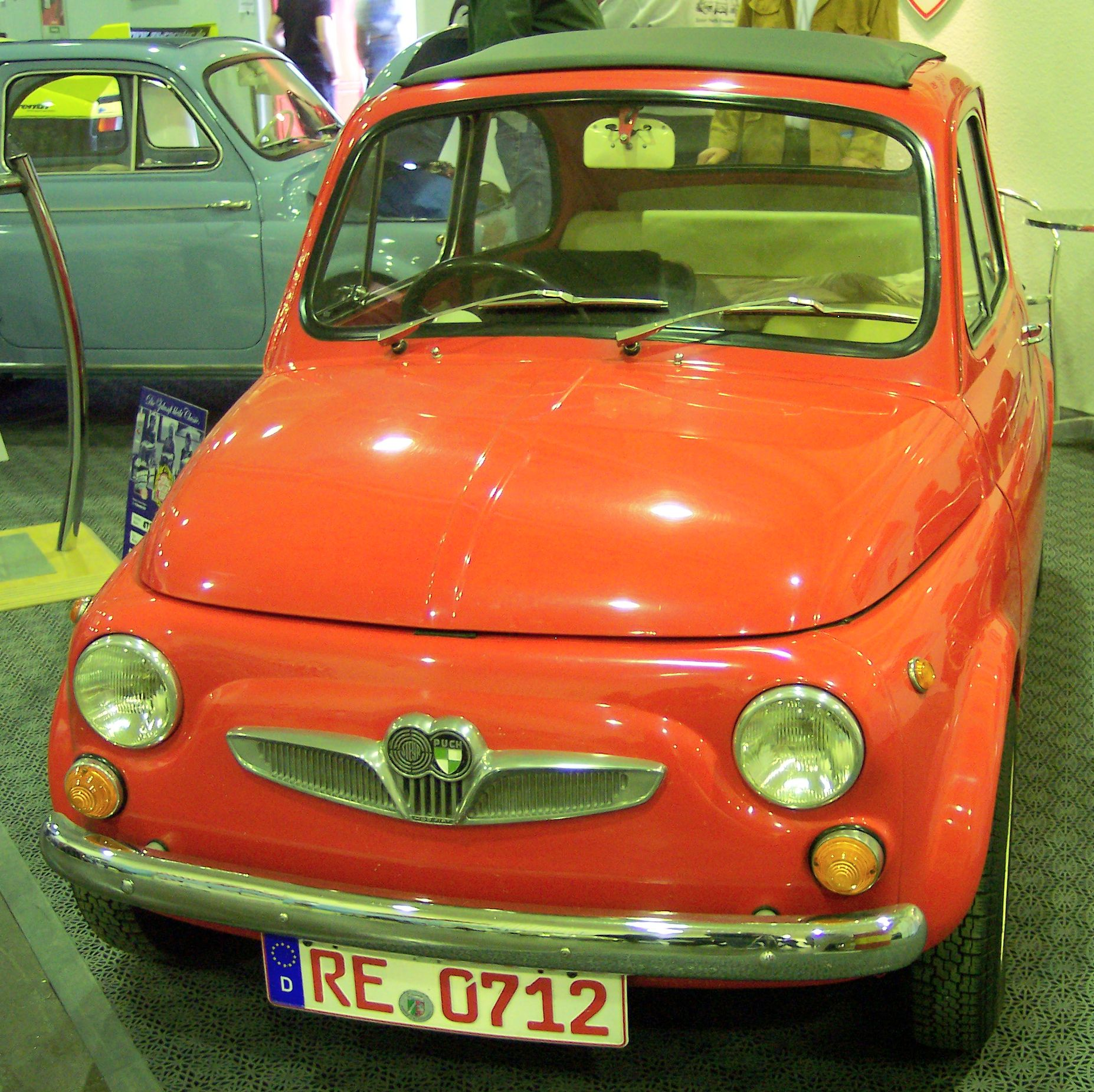

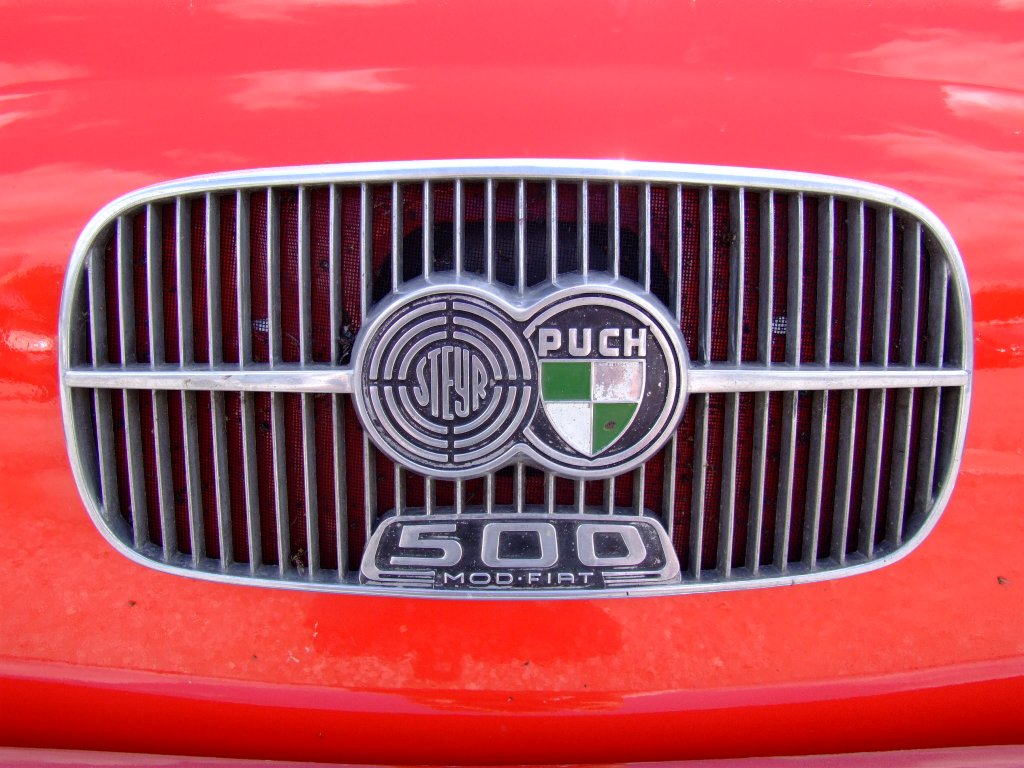

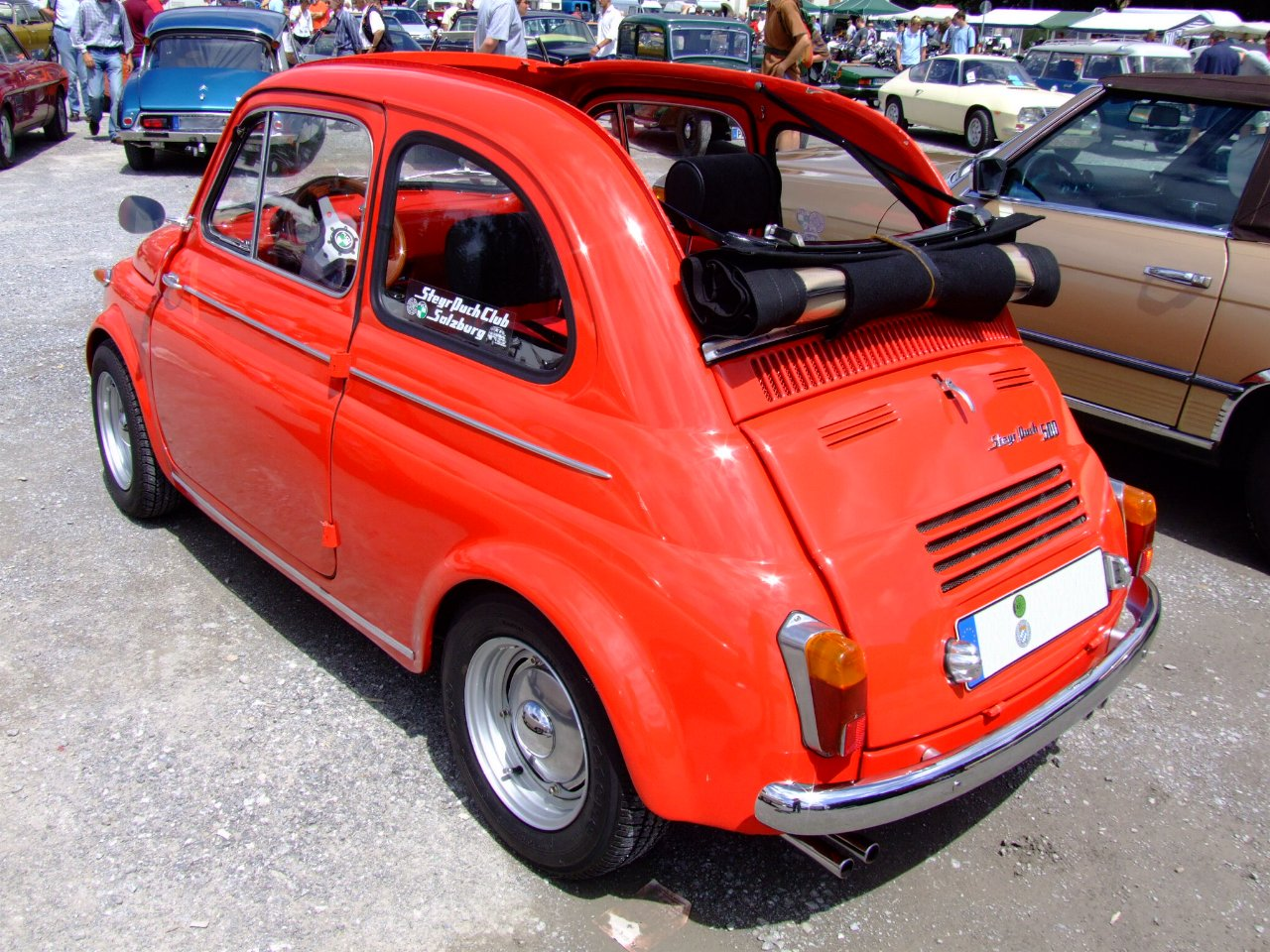

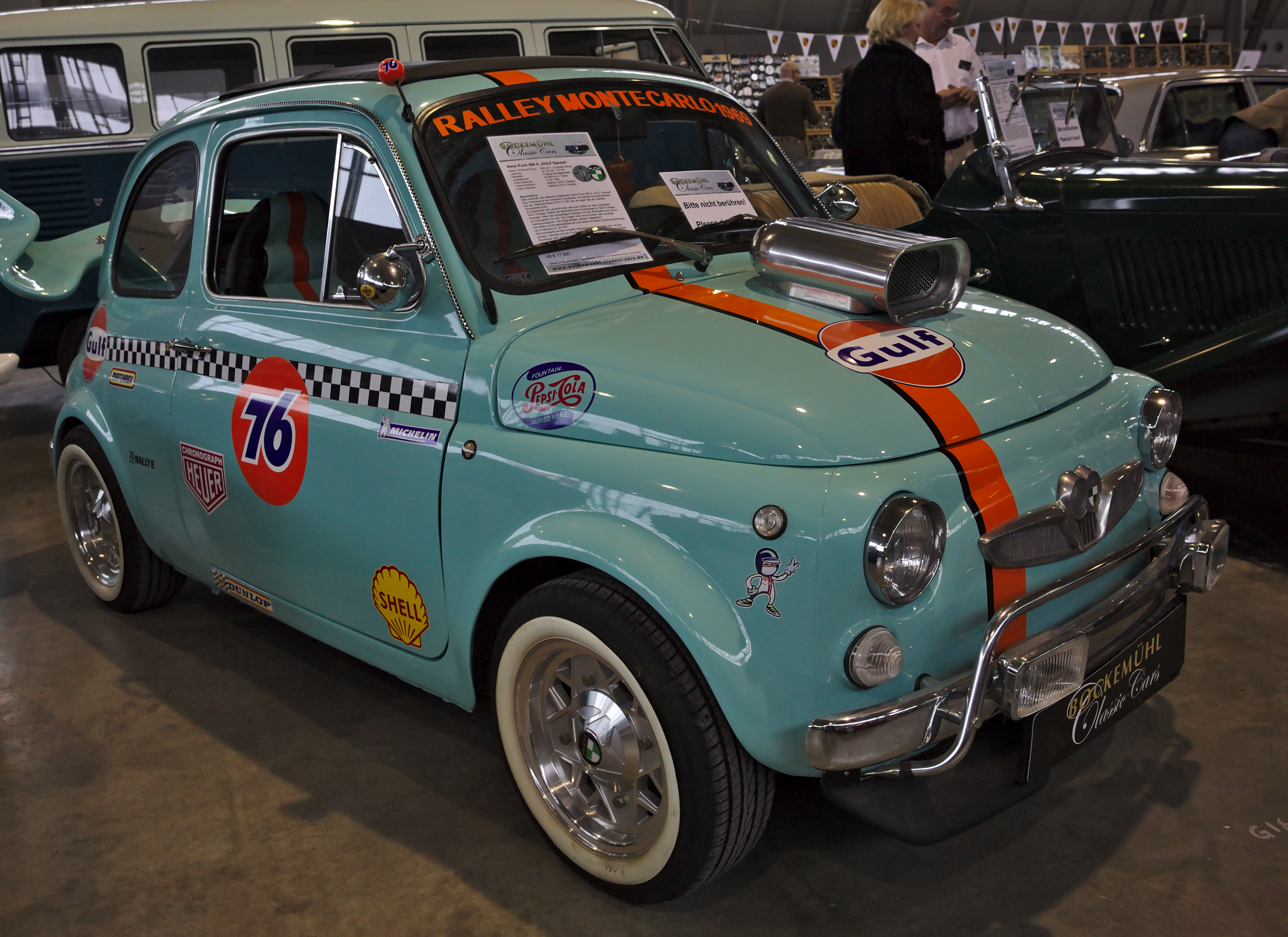

== Literature and sources ==
- Steyr Puch Club Salzburg
- Friends of Steyr Puch Austria
- Johann Puch Museum, Graz Austria
