= Fiat 500 =

1960s rear-engine small city car

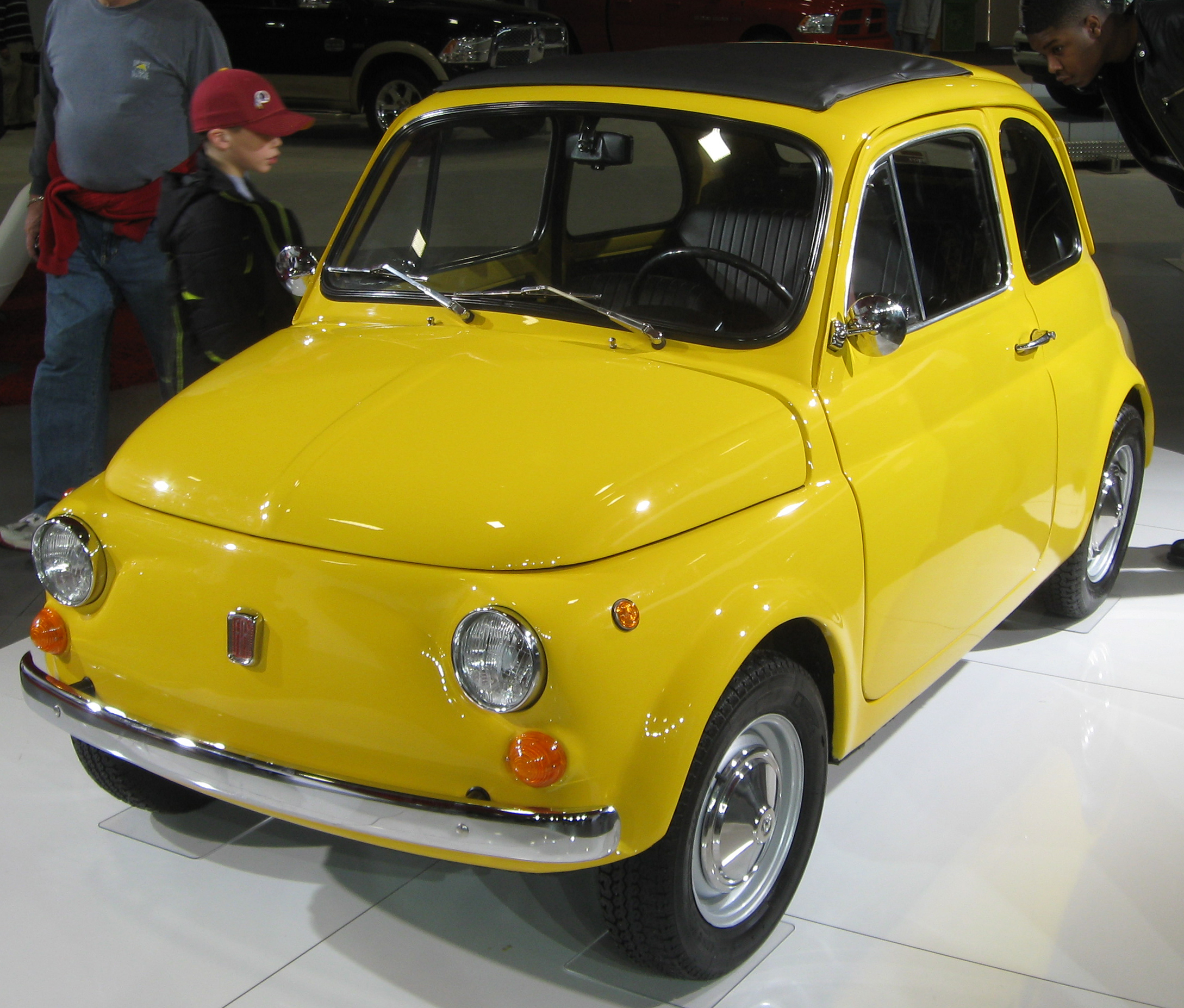
- 1970 Fiat 500 L

Overview
- Manufacturer: Fiat
- Also called: Puch 500
- Production: 1957–1975; 3,893,294 units
- Assembly: Italy: Turin; Italy: Desio; Italy: Termini Imerese; Austria: Graz (Steyr Puch); New Zealand: Ōtāhuhu (Torino Motors)
- Designer: Dante Giacosa

Body and chassis
- Class: City car (A)
- Body style: 2-door saloon; 2-door semi-convertible; 3-door estate ('Giardiniera'); 3-door panel van
- Layout: Rear-engine, rear-wheel drive
- Doors: Suicide (1957–1965); Conventional (1965–1975)
- Related: Autobianchi Bianchina; NSU/Fiat Weinsberg 500; Vignale Gamine; Autobianchi Giardiniera

Powertrain
- Engine: 479 cc I2; 499 cc I2; 594 cc I2
- Transmission: 4-speed manual (non-synchronous)

Dimensions
- Wheelbase: 1,840 mm (72.4 in); 1,940 mm (76.4 in) (Giardiniera)
- Length: 2,970 mm (116.9 in); 3,185 mm (125.4 in) (Giardiniera)
- Width: 1,320 mm (52.0 in)
- Height: 1,320 mm (52.0 in)
- Kerb weight: 499 kg (1,100 lb)

Chronology
- Predecessor: Fiat 500 "Topolino"
- Successor: Fiat 126; Fiat 500 (2007)

The Fiat 500 (Italian: Cinquecento, pronounced [ˌtʃiŋkweˈtʃɛnto]) is an economy / city car that was manufactured and marketed by Fiat Automobiles from 1957 until 1975. It was sold as a two-door semi-convertible or saloon car and as a three-door panel van or estate car.

Launched as the Nuova (new) 500 in July 1957, as a successor to the 500 "Topolino", it was an inexpensive and practical small car. Measuring 2,970 mm (9 ft 9 in) long, originally powered by a rear-mounted 479 cc two-cylinder air-cooled engine, the 500 was 245 mm (9.6 in) smaller than the Fiat's 600, launched two years earlier, and is considered one of the first purpose-designed city cars.

In 1959, Dante Giacosa received a Compasso d'Oro industrial design prize for the Fiat 500. This marked the first time a Compasso d’Oro was awarded to an automotive manufacturer.

== History ==
In 1936, Fiat released the front engine Fiat 500 economy car, often better known as the Topolino. In 1949 to meet the demands of the post-war market, production resumed on the 500C with revised front and rear bodywork. Initially, it only had a 2-door coupé body with sun-roof, like before the war, which was later complemented by an Estate version, importantly offering some family-valued rear seating space. Both continued until 1955 when they were replaced by an all-new, lighter car: the Fiat 600. This new car had a rear-mounted engine, on the pattern of the Volkswagen Beetle. Two years later, Fiat introduced an even smaller rear-engined model: the Nuova 500. Several car makers followed the uncommon rear engine and drive configuration at the time and were quite successful. From October 1961, a 'Neckar' version of the 500 was manufactured in Heilbronn, Germany, under a complicated deal involving NSU motorcars, and Steyr-Puch produced a Fiat 500 version under licence in Graz, Austria.

Despite its very small size, the 500 proved to be an enormously practical vehicle with large sales throughout Europe. Besides the two-door saloon, it was also available as the "Giardiniera" estate; this variant featured the standard engine laid on its side, the wheelbase lengthened by 100 mm (3.9 in) to provide a more convenient rear seat, a full-length sunroof and larger brakes from the Fiat 600. The Fiat 500 has a drag coefficient of Cd=0.38, a good number for its time.

Although the 1958-61 Fiat 500N (Normale) was the only version officially sold in North America, the Fiat 500 was a popular gray-market car in the 1960s and 1970s, with private imports in the thousands.

Sports models were produced by Abarth, as well as by Giannini. An Austrian variant, produced by Steyr-Daimler-Puch, the 1957–1973 Steyr-Puch 500, had a Puch boxer twin motor, a sports model of which was the 1965–1969 Steyr-Puch 650 TR2.

Production of the 500 ended in 1975, although its replacement, the Fiat 126, was launched two years earlier. The 126 was not as successful as its predecessor in Italy, but sold well in the Eastern Bloc countries, being assembled and manufactured in Poland as a Polski Fiat.

In 2006, the magazine Top Gear voted the Fiat 500 "the sexiest car"

In 2007, the 50th anniversary of the Nuova 500's launch, Fiat launched another new 500, stylistically inspired by the 1957 Nuova 500, featuring a front-mounted engine and front-wheel drive.

In 2017, Fiat celebrated the 60th anniversary with an exhibit at the Museum of Modern Art in New York City and received one of the Corporate Art Awards by pptArt at an event hosted by the President of the Italian Republic Sergio Mattarella at the Quirinal Palace.

== Models ==
=== Nuova 500 (1957–1960) ===
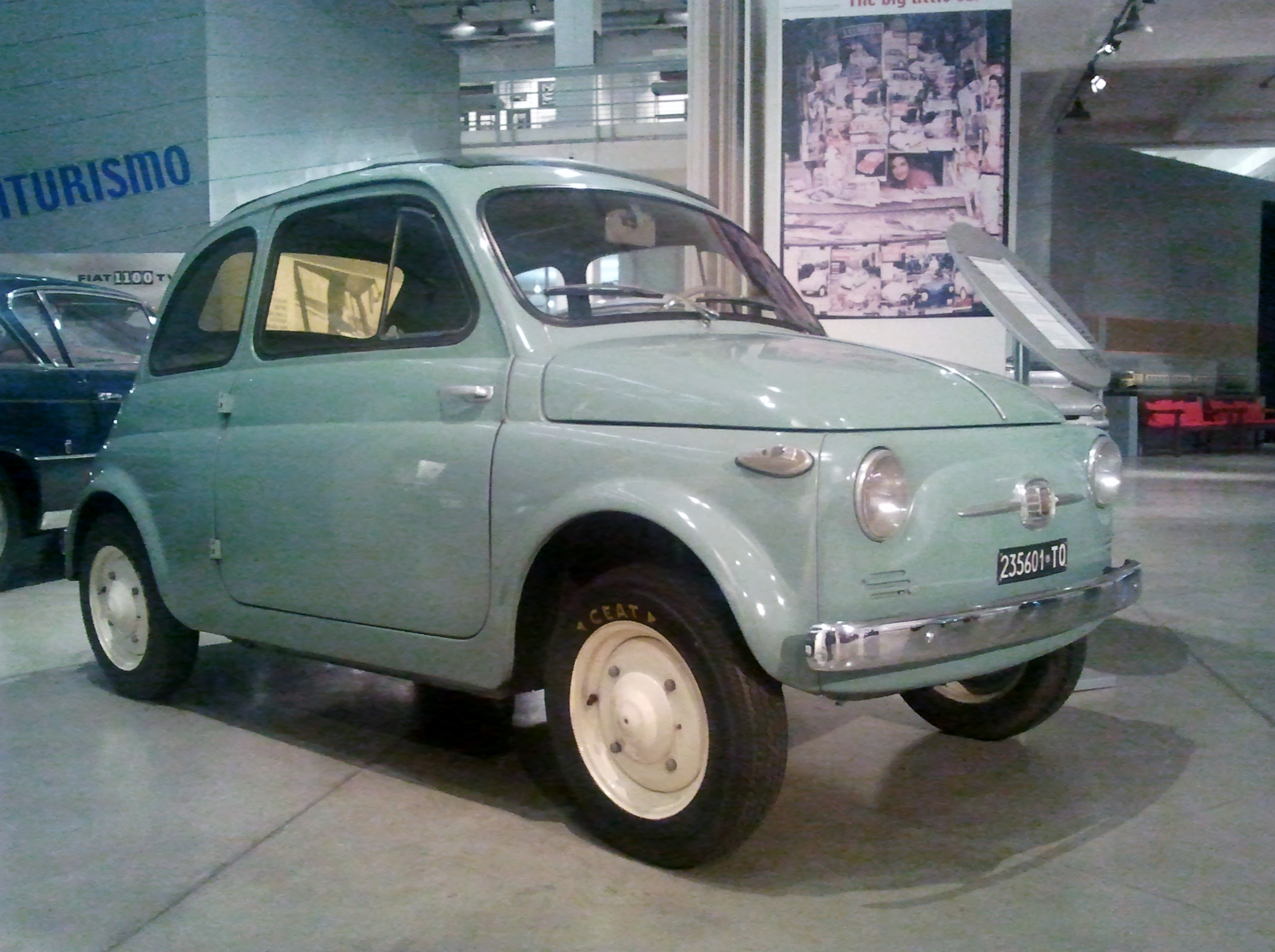
A Nuova 500, as it was launched in 1957, preserved in the Centro storico Fiat

The 500 features a 479 cc (500 cc nominal) two-cylinder engine, hence the name, producing just 13 hp (10 kW). This model also features a fabric roof, foldable to the rear of the vehicle, like that of a Fiat 500 Topolino — rather than the later roof design, which only folds half way back along the roof. The Nuova 500 is one of three models featuring "suicide doors."

Including the Sport model, in total 181,036 examples of the Nuova 500 were produced from 1957 until 1960.

=== Nuova 500 Sport (1958–1960) ===
In mid-1958, Fiat introduced the Nuova 500 Sport, featuring a more powerful engine and a two-tone livery—white with a red stripe along the flanks. Unique to the Sport was an all-metal rigid roof with three longitudinal grooves. A short-open-roof model was added a year later, in 1959.

Coded type 110.004, the 500 Sport's two-cylinder engine had been bored out to 499.5 cc from the original 479 cc (bore and stroke now 67.4 × 70 mm), giving it very respectable power with the same block: 21.5 PS (16 kW; 21 hp). Top speed was over 105 km/h (65 mph).

=== 500 D (1960–1965) ===
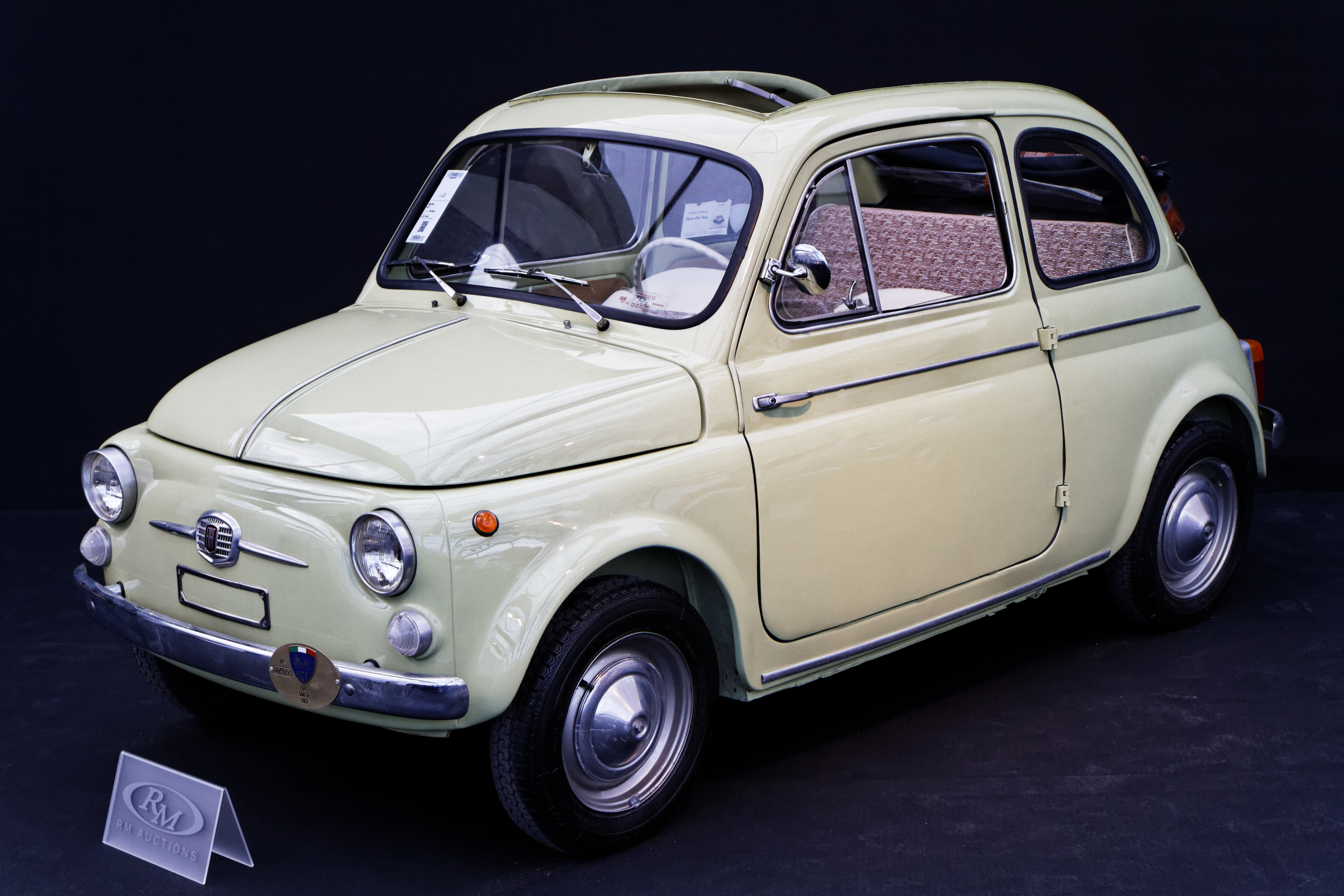
Fiat 500

Replacing the original Nuova in 1960, the D looks very similar to the Nuova, but there are two key differences. One is the engine size (the D features an uprated 499 cc engine producing 17 bhp (13 kW)—this engine is used until the end of the L in 1973) and the other is the roof: the standard D roof does not fold back as far as the roof on the Nuova, though it was also available as the "Transformable" with the same roof as the Nuova. The D also features "suicide doors".

In New Zealand, where it was locally assembled by Torino Motors, the 500 D was sold as the "Fiat Bambina" (Italian for "baby"), a name that is still in to describe this car.

=== 500 Giardiniera (1960–1968) ===
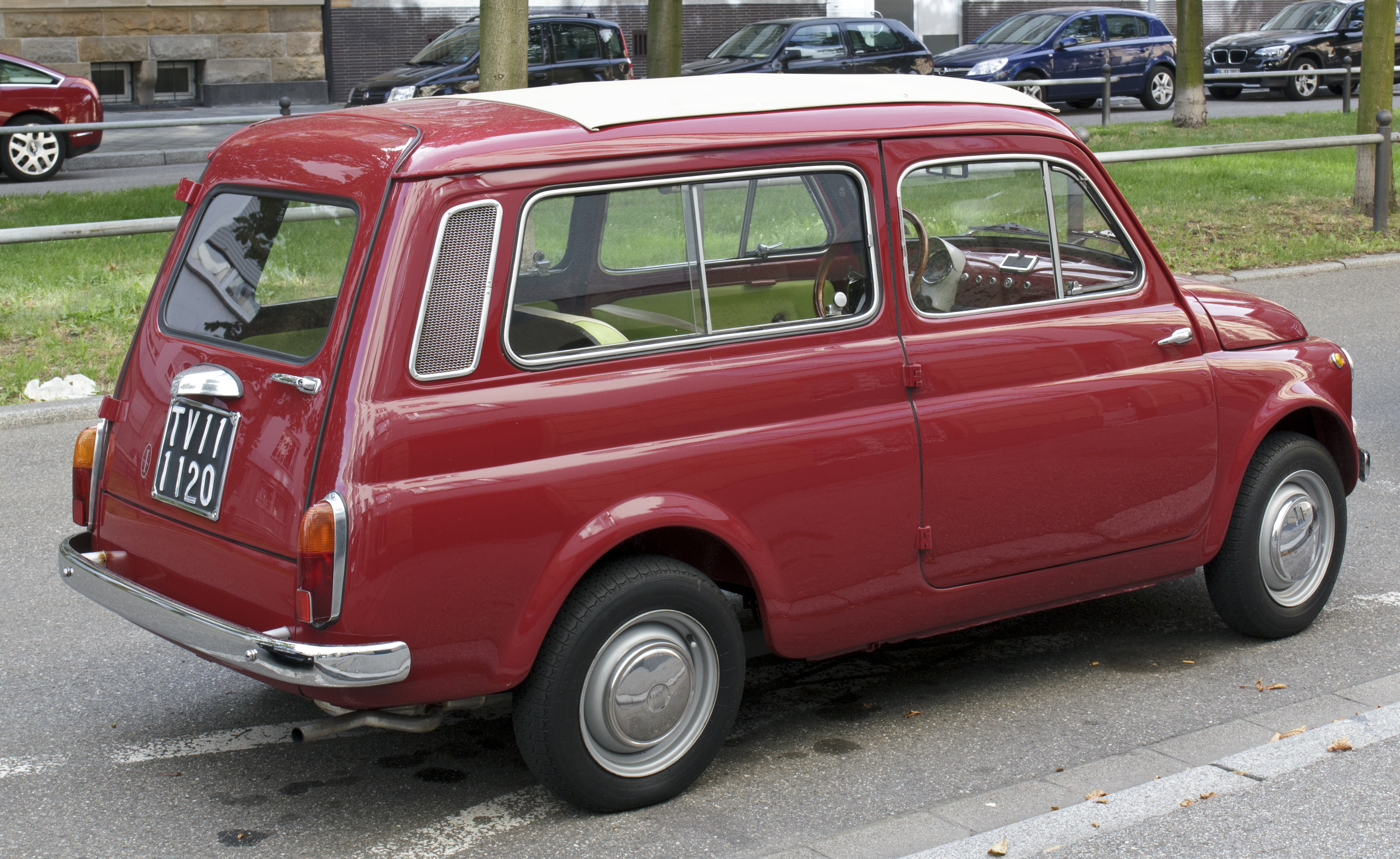
Fiat 500 Giardiniera

The 500 Giardiniera (500 K on some markets) estate version of the Fiat 500 is the longest running model. The engine is under the floor of the boot to create a flat loading surface. The roof on this model also stretches all the way to the rear, not stopping above the driver and front passenger as it does in other models of the period. The Giardiniera also features "suicide doors" and was the only model to continue to use this door type into the 1970s. In 1966 production was transferred to Desio where the Giardiniera was built by Fiat subsidiary Autobianchi under their marque from 1968 to 1977. A total of 327,000 Giardinieras were produced, and from 1968 sold only as Autobianchi Giardiniera.

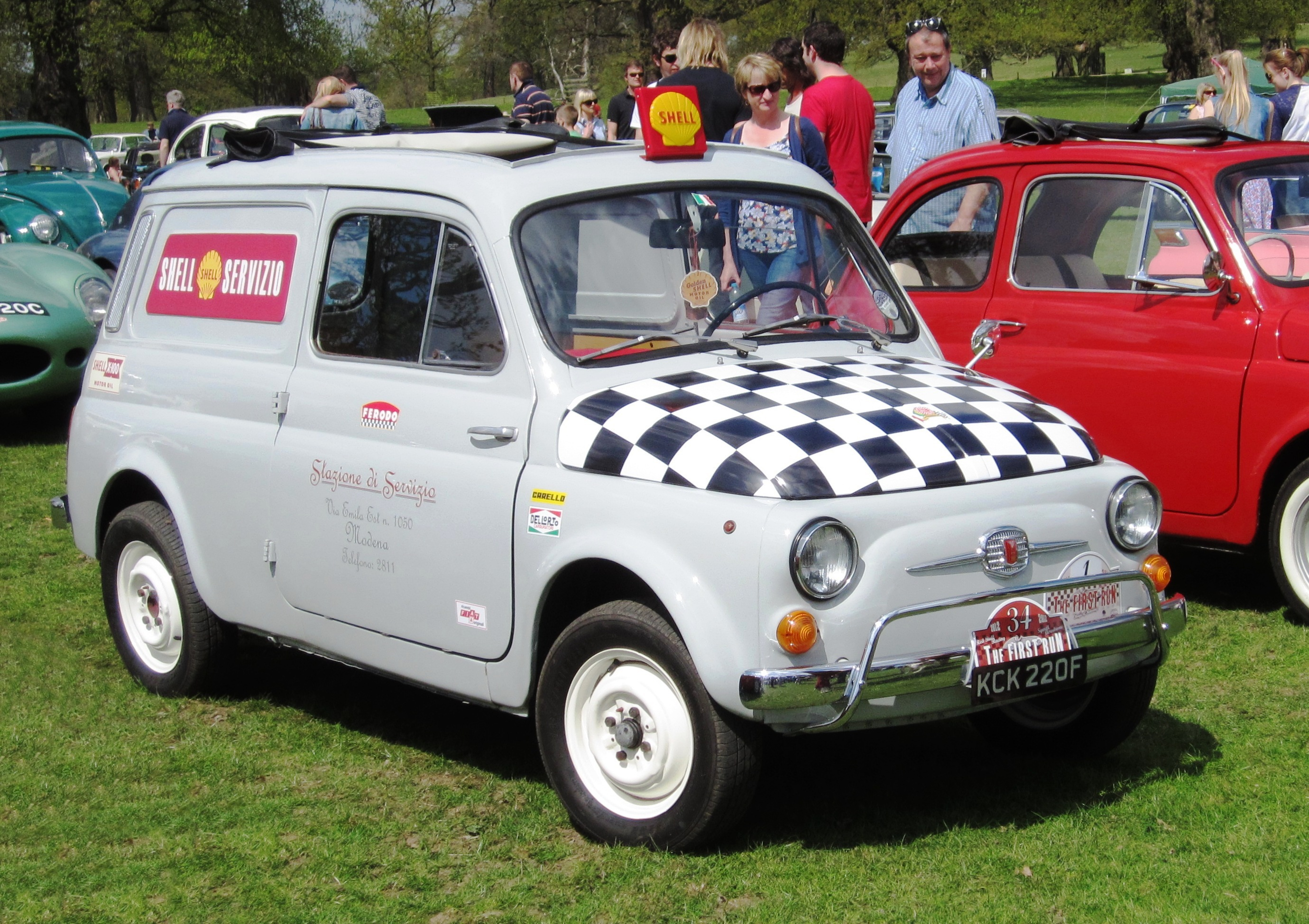
Fiat 500 Furgoncino

=== 500 Furgoncino ===
A panel van variant of the Giardiniera (estate) was offered as the Furgoncino.

=== 500 F or Berlina (1965–1972) ===
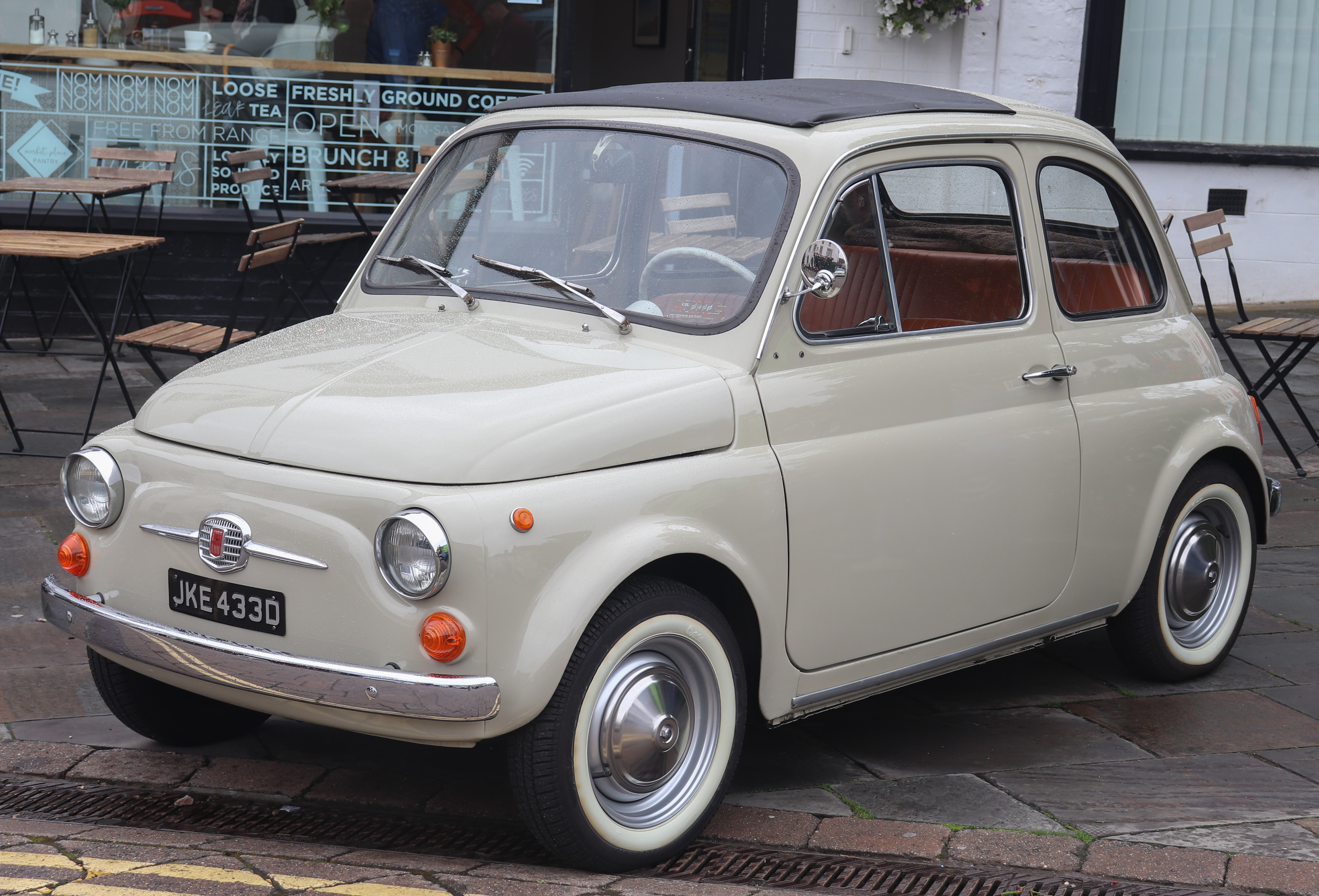
Fiat 500F

The F spans two periods of 500 production, the D and the L. As such, it is the most frequently misidentified model. Between 1965 and 1969 the F carried the same badging as the D, but the two models are distinguishable by the positioning of their door hinges. The D has "suicide doors": the F, produced from June 1965, at last featured front-hinged doors. This was the result of new safety regulations which required front-hinged doors on passenger cars - the Giardiniera was officially a commercial vehicle and was thus allowed to retain the original, rear-hinged design. Between 1969 and 1972 the F was sold alongside the Lusso model as a cheaper "base model" alternative. While the F and L are mechanically very similar, the key differences are the bumpers (the L has an extra chrome nudge bar) and the interior (the F interior is nearly identical to the original 1957 design while the L sports a much more modern look).

The 500 F is perhaps most associated with the Japanese media franchise Lupin III, where it has been associated with the eponymous character since appearing in the 1971 television series Lupin the 3rd Part 1, the first screen adaptation of the Lupin III manga, but has been most prominently linked with the franchise since the release of the 1979 film Lupin III: The Castle of Cagliostro.

=== 500 L or Lusso (1968–1972) ===
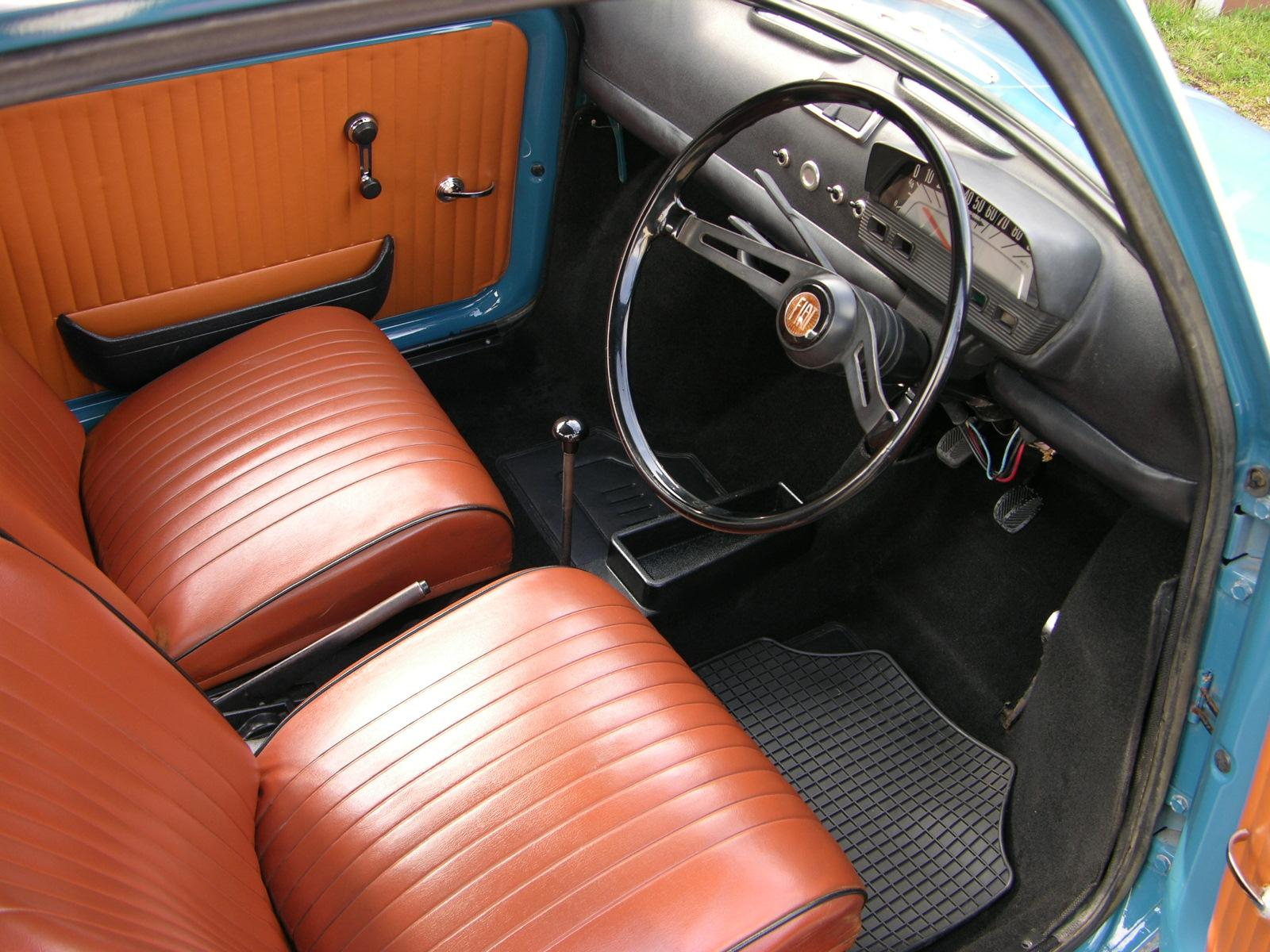
Fiat 500L interior

In September 1968 Fiat sold the 500 L or Lusso (tipo 110 F/L), a more richly trimmed and better appointed version of the standard 500 F. The 500 L remained on sale until 1972, when the new Fiat 126 was introduced.

Perhaps the most obvious new feature of the 500 L were tubular guards protecting the front bumper and the corners of the rear one. As a result, the car was about 55 mm (2.2 in) longer than the 500 F at 3,025 mm (119 in). Other model-specific exterior items were a new Fiat badge at the front, redesigned hubcaps, chrome plastic mouldings covering the roof drip rails, and bright trim around windscreen and rear window. Inside the dashboard was entirely covered in black anti-glare plastic material instead of being bare painted metal, and was fitted with a new trapezoid instrument binnacle replacing the round one used on all other 500 models. The steering wheel was black plastic with metal spokes. The door cards—upholstered in the same pleated pattern leatherette used on the seats—carried redesigned and relocated door handles and new door pockets. More storage space was provided in the form of a tray on the centre tunnel, which like the rest of the floor was covered in carpet rather than rubber mats. Except for radial instead of bias ply tires, from a mechanical standpoint the 500 L was identical to the coeval 500 F.

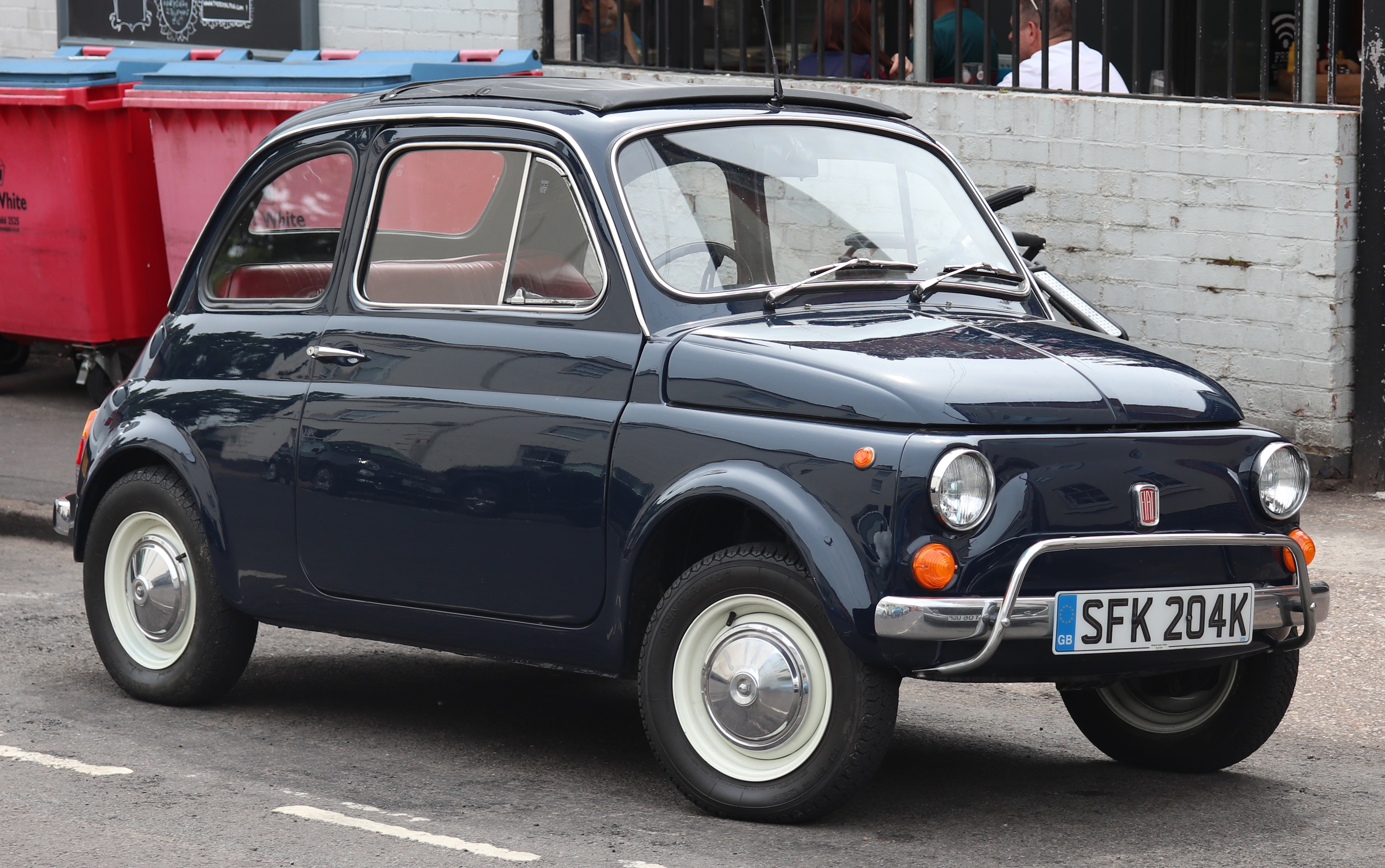
Fiat 500 L

=== 500 R or Rinnovata (1972–1975) ===
The last incarnation of the Fiat 500 was the R model, or "Rinnovata" (Renovated). Launched alongside the new Fiat 126 in November 1972, it had the same 594 cc engine of the 126, however, the power rating is the same as the L but at lower rpm (4000 instead of 4400) and with a bit more torque; a full synchromesh gearbox is still missing. The floor-pan which was from either the 'L', or later, the new 126. It was also more comfortable, but more simply trimmed and equipped than before — the fuel gauge was omitted and only the low fuel indicator remained. The 500 R was also a stop-gap for Fiat prior to the launch of the Fiat 126, and when the new 126 was launched, sales of the old Fiat 500 R plummeted. It was sold alongside the Fiat 126 for another three years before Fiat retired the 500.

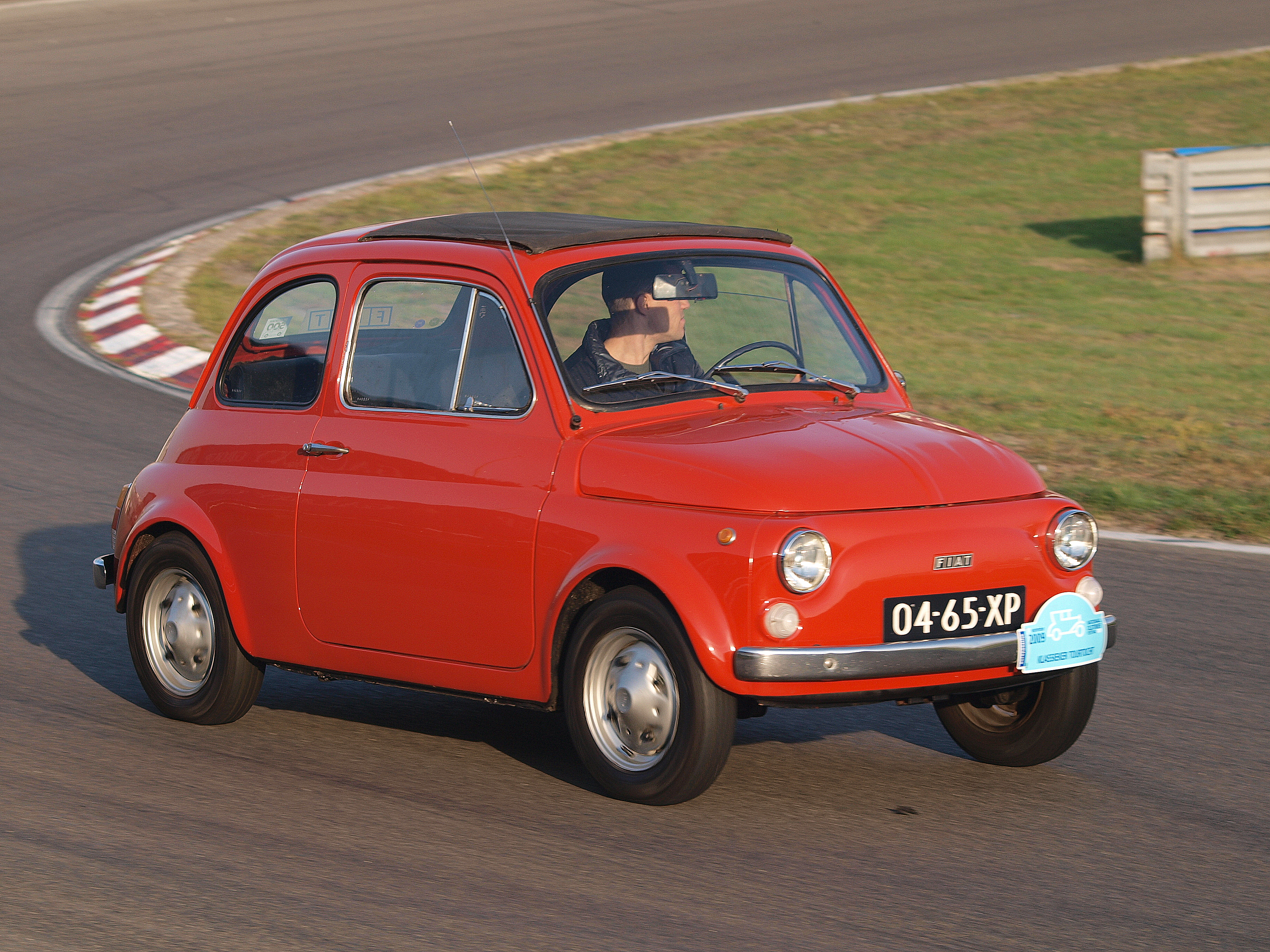
Fiat 500 R

=== Fiat 500 America ===
During the years in which it produced the 500 in Italy, Fiat designed and produced a US-market version of the car with 15hp using the 479cc engine. Changes to the car include prominent headlamps to meet US standards (also used on the American 500 Jolly). They also came equipped with larger front and rear bumpers with bumperettes, and a speedometer in MPH. It can also be noted that there were 4 tail lights used for the N model however only 3 were used for the American version. In 1958 it is believed that Carello (the producer of the tail lights for Fiat) began a strike leading to changes in the design. Thus leading the 58's to have a color matched base with the body, early 59's to have an aluminum base thicker than the European model, and late 59 and 60's to have a "D model" style base. The 1958 Fiat 500 America came equipped with a flat floor pan which was later revised for the 1959 and 1960 version to have a scoop for more leg room. Another notable difference is in the routing of the heating tubes between these earlier years. Towards the end of 59 models Fiat began transitioning to their D model. Some notable changes include the different tail lights, removal of the fresh air vents on the nose, and only 2 water drainage ports (downgraded from the 3 previous years had) along the bottom of the doors. About 300 were made between 1958 and 1960 at which point they were discontinued as they did not do well in the American market compared to the competition. There was a special "sport" version of this car where the engine was bored out to 499.5 to produce 21 hp, coming only in white with a red stripe across the car.

=== Derivatives ===
==== Abarth 695 SS (1964–1971) ====
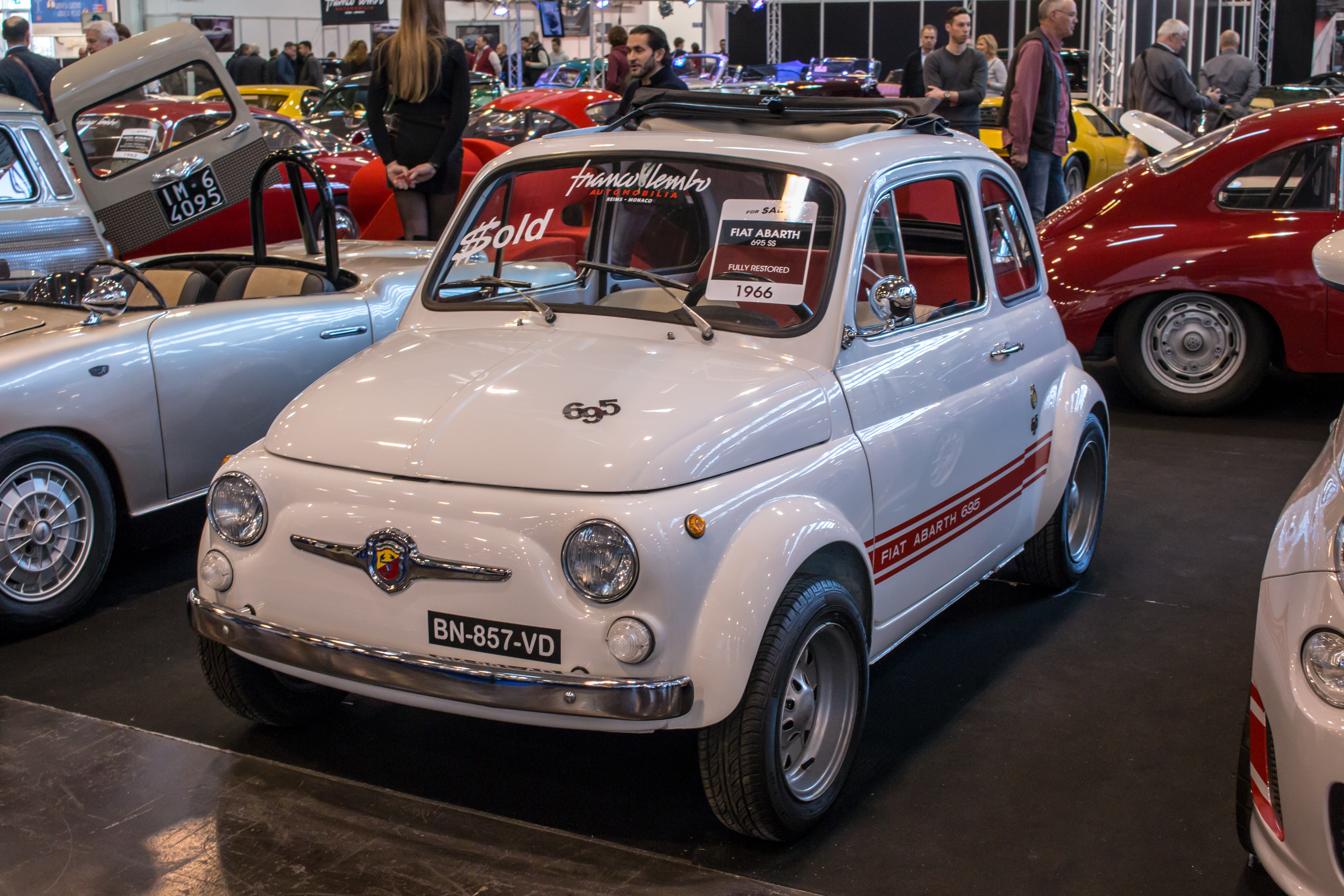
Fiat Abarth 695 SS

Of all the performance-oriented models created by Karl Abarth, later known as Carlo Abarth, perhaps the 695 esse esse is the best representation of the scorpion-branded firm's collaboration with Fiat. Around 1,000 Fiat Abarth 695 SS were produced and only 150 are believed to remain.

Abarth introduced its 695 SS version in 1966, after the previous presentation back in 1964. The rear-engine, rear-wheel-drive layout Fiat 500 was the basis of the project. When compared to the production version of the 500, aesthetically the 695 received different logos, a new badge on the radiator grille, and the coat of arms on both sides of the car. The 695 SS was also the only version to feature flared arches and required a raised engine cover for extra stability and cooling. Smaller (but considerably wider) 10-inch Campagnolo alloys were fitted, while a higher final drive was fitted to compensate and also to make use of the additional power.

Like all Abarths, the differences are found in the mechanical upgrades that helped to increase its top speed to around 140 km/h (87 mph). The OHV, two valves per cylinder inline-two engine, exhaust pipe, head and valve-springs were upgraded and specially designed pistons and camshaft fitted. It had an equal square bore and stroke ratio of 76 mm × 76 mm (2.99 in × 2.99 in) for a total displacement of 689.5 cc (0.7 L; 42.1 cu in) and the original single Solex 34PBIC carburetor was increased in size with a compression ratio of 9.8:1 developing 38 PS (37 bhp; 28 kW) at 5200 rpm and 57 N⋅m (42 lbf⋅ft) of torque at 4000 rpm.

==== Fiat 500 Jolly Ghia ====
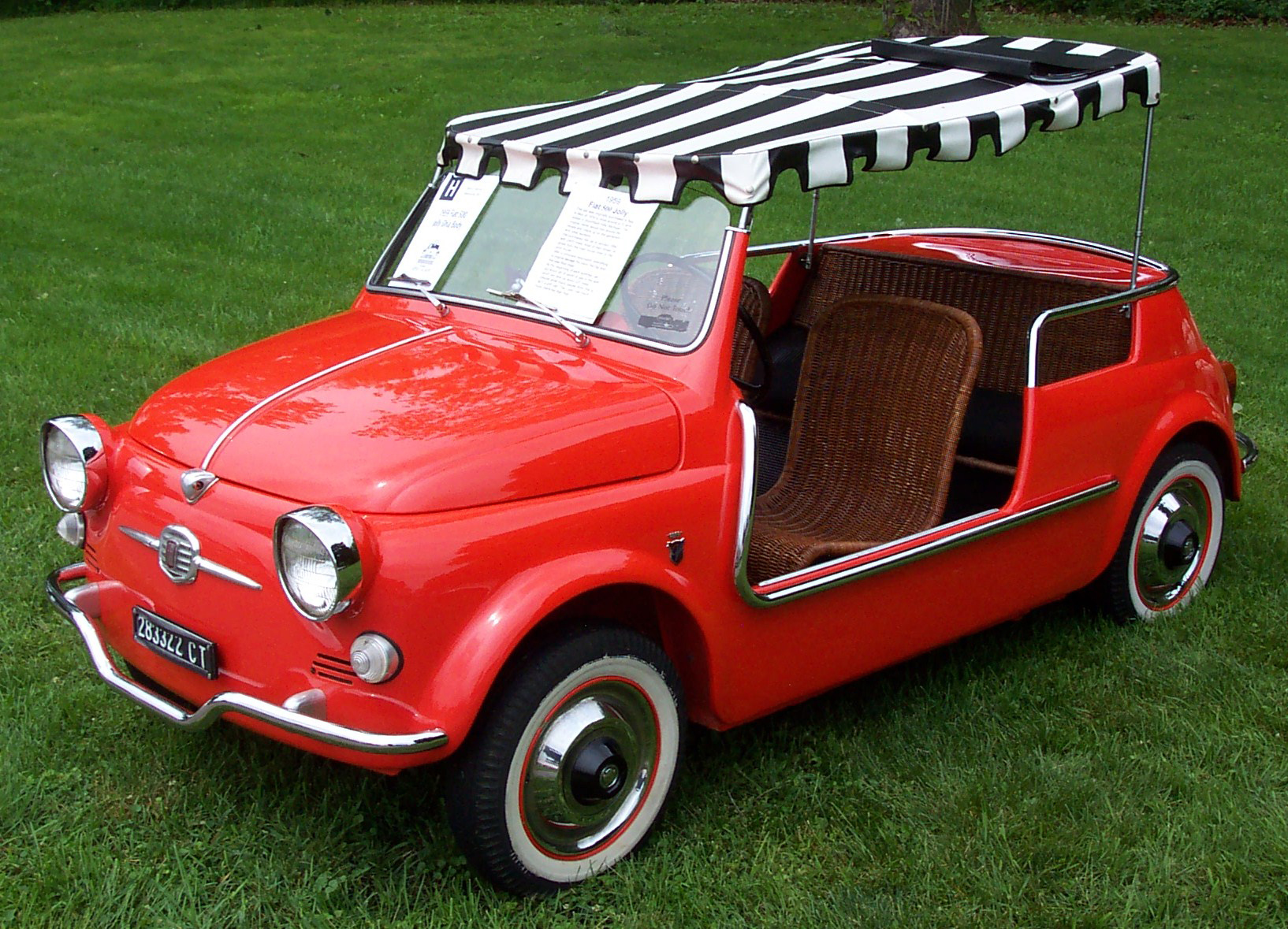
Fiat 500 Jolly by Ghia, US market

Carrozzeria Ghia custom manufactured a "Jolly" variant of the 500, inspired by the limited edition Fiat 600 Jolly, and featuring an open-air, doorless design with wicker seats and a removable fabric canopy roof — similar in concept to the Citroën Méhari, BMC Mini Moke and Volkswagen Type 181.

== 2007 Fiat 500 ==
First announced in May 2006, Fiat previewed an all-new four-seat three-door hatchback 500 model in March 2007 – fifty years after the first Fiat 500 was presented. The design of the 2007 Fiat 500 is based on the 2004 Fiat Trepiùno concept.

The new model features a distinctive retro style – following the pattern of the Volkswagen New Beetle and BMW MINI – as modern reinterpretation of Dante Giacosa's 1957 original rear-engined Fiat 500. Production started in mid-2007 in Fiat facilities in Tychy, Poland, and later in Toluca, Mexico. Numerous trim, equipment, and performance versions are offered with a convertible body style available starting in 2009.

The 500 is also offered in Abarth trim, with 1.4L Turbo Petrol engine, sport exhaust, suspension, and transmission.

The Fiat 500 automobile platform is the basis of the second-generation Ford Ka.

== See also ==
- Fiat 126 – successor to the Fiat 500 in many markets.
- Fiat 500 "Topolino" – the predecessor, and "original" 500.
- Fiat Topolino (2023) – a quadricycle modelled to look similar to the car.
- Fiat 600 – the model above the 500, only slightly larger in size and engine displacement.
- Fiat Cinquecento – "five hundred" in Italian.
- Fiat 500X – a mini SUV.
- Fiat 500L – a mini MPV.
- Fiat ESV 1500 – an experimental safety vehicle built by Fiat in 1971, based on the 500.
- Puch 500 – the Austrian license produced version.
- BMW 600 – introduced in the same year, the only four-seat car that was even shorter than the 500.
- Zastava 750 – a similar car produced by Yugoslavia's Zastava.
- Autobianchi Bianchina – based on the Fiat 500 mechanicals.
- Giannini Automobili – Abarth's main competitor for selling tuned 500s.
- Vignale Gamine – a roadster based on the Fiat 500.

Beach cars:

- Citroën Méhari
- Renault Rodeo
- Meyers Manx
- BMC Mini Moke

== Sources ==
- Abarth 595 695, Elvio Deganello and Renato Donati, Giorgio Nada, 2002 ISBN 88-7911-287-2
- Album Fiat 500, di J.J. Galkowsky, EPA Edition ISBN 2-85120-470-X
- Autopassion Hors Serie, Auto collection n. 22
- Fiat & Abarth 500-600, Malcolm Bobbit, Veloce Publishing ISBN 1-903706-69-6
- Fiat 500, Elvio Deganello, Giorgio Nada, 2002 ISBN 88-7911-069-1
- Fiat 500, Alessandro Sannia, Motorbuch-Verlag, Stuttgart 2007, ISBN 978-3-613-02825-8.
- Fiat 500 – az apró, mégis óriási legenda, Alessandro Sannia, Alexandra, 2006, ISBN 963-369-555-4.
- Fiat 500 – de kleine grote mythe, Alessandro Sannia, Rebo, 2006, ISBN 90-366-1875-4
- Fiat 500 fuoriserie, Alessandro Sannia, All Media, 2003
- Fiat 500 (genio di un'epoca), Ugo Castagnotto and Anna Maria Quarona, Lindau, 1992 ISBN 88-7180-039-7.
- Fiat 500 – guida al restauro, Marcello Lo Vetere and Italo Grossi, Giorgio Nada, 2003 ISBN 88-7911-209-0.
- Fiat 500 Gold Portfolio 1936–1972, R.M. Clarke, Brooklands ISBN 1-85520-246-8
- Fiat 500: la Guida – the Guide, Alessandro Sannia, All Media, 2003
- Fiat 500 – l'evoluzione del mito, Alessandro Sannia, Gribaudo, 2007, ISBN 978-88-7906-385-2
- Fiat 500 – piccolo grande mito, Alessandro Sannia, Gribaudo, 2005, ISBN 88-7906-020-1.
- I miei 40 anni alla Fiat, Dante Giacosa
- Il grande libro delle giardinette Fiat, Alessandro Sannia, Giorgio Nada, 2007, ISBN 978-88-7911-401-1.
- Io Franco Giannini vi racconto, Franco Giannini
- La 500, by Romano Strizioli, pub. by Bacchetta
- La Fiat 500 – Storia di un mito, Stefano Parenti, Polo Books ISBN 88-87577-26-9.
- La Fiat Nuova 500, Enzo Altorio, Automitica, 2005 ISBN 88-86304-00-5
- La Fiat 500 de mon père, Lauvrey - Le Fay, E.T.A.I. 1998 ISBN 2-7268-8178-5
- Le Giannini, Enzo Altorio, Automitica
- "Fiat 500" Topolino, Paulo Felizes, Matosinhos: Cardume, 2016 ISBN 978-989-99589-9-9
- Progetti alla Fiat prima del computer, Dante Giacosa, Automobilia ISBN 88-85880-00-2.
- Revue Technique Automobile 500, D, F, L, ì E.T.A.I.
- Fiat 500, 600 : mit Topolino, Jagst, Multipla und Weinsberg; 1936–69; eine Dokumentation, Schrader Verlag, München 1987, ISBN 3-922617-26-3.
- Fiat—Tutti i modelli del Novecento. Vol. I. Editoriale Domus. 2010.
