= Autobianchi Giardiniera =

Overview
- Manufacturer: Autobianchi
- Also called: Autobianchi Bianchina Giardiniera
- Production: 1968–1977
- Assembly: Italy: Desio, Milan
- Designer: Dante Giacosa

Body and chassis
- Class: Supermini
- Body style: 3-door estate van
- Layout: RR layout
- Doors: Suicide
- Related: Fiat 500 Giardiniera

Powertrain
- Engine: 499 cc OHV I2
- Transmission: 4-speed manual

Dimensions
- Length: 3,190 mm (126 in)
- Width: 1,330 mm (52 in)
- Height: 1,340 mm (53 in)
- Curb weight: 560 kg (1,230 lb)

Chronology
- Predecessor: Autobianchi Bianchina Panoramica & Furgoncino; Fiat 500 Giardiniera
- Successor: Autobianchi "Nuova A112"

The Autobianchi Giardiniera is a supermini produced by the Italian automaker Autobianchi, based on the Fiat 500 Giardiniera. The Fiat version was offered since 1960, and was available in various configurations: station wagon and van. The Autobianchi Giardiniera was produced from 1968 to 1977, effectively replacing the Fiat counterpart.

It was also marketed as the Autobianchi Bianchina Giardiniera. The overall layout was very similar to the earlier Panoramica but the Giardiniera was more utilitarian oriented and ideally suited for light commerce. It also retained the same exterior design from Fiat with only a badge change, and still featured the suicide doors.

== Production ==
Model	Years produced	Power (bhp)	Capacity (cc)	Production
Giardiniera wagon	1968–1977	17.5	499	
Giardiniera Furgoncino van	1968–1977	17.5	499	

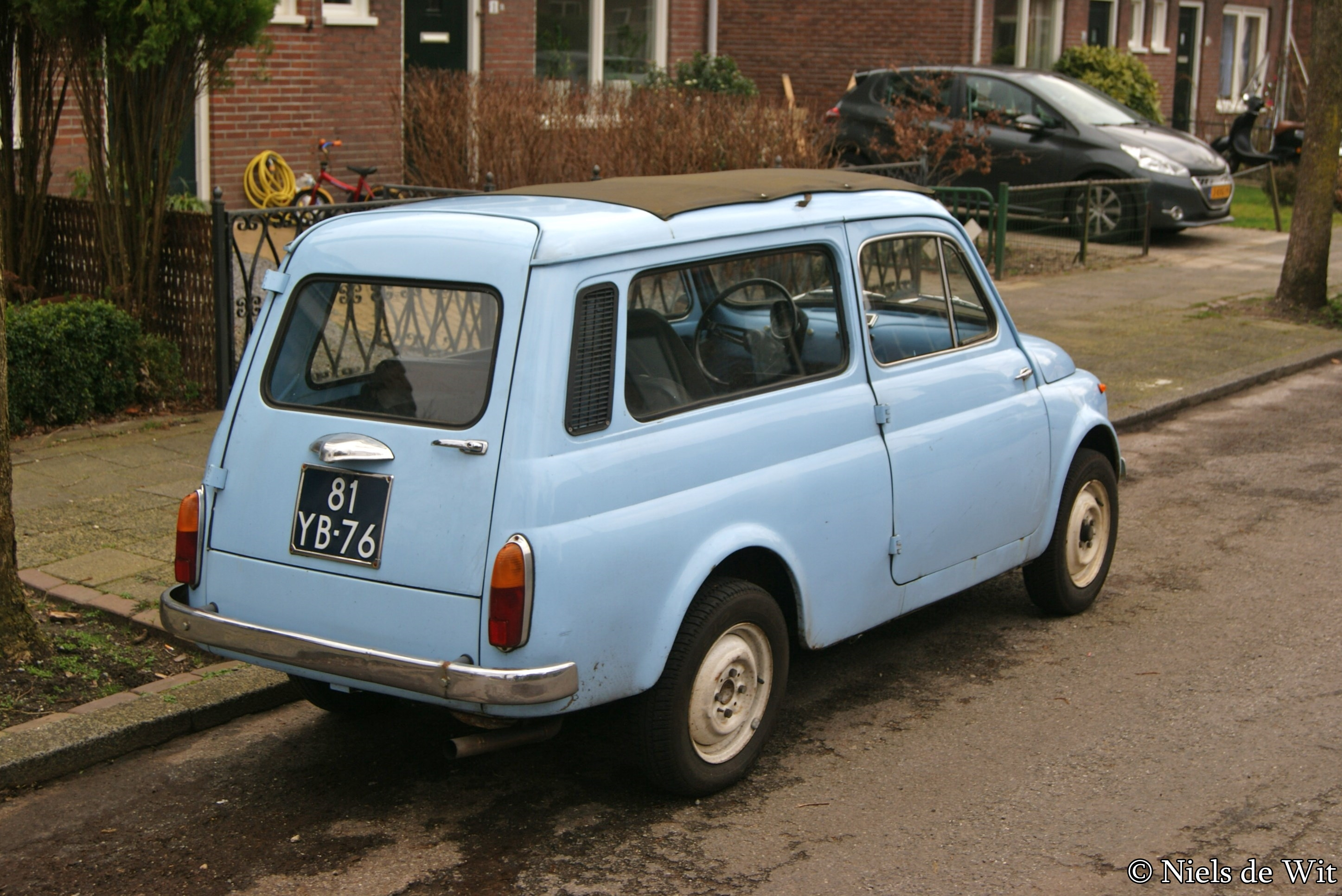
Giardiniera rear view
