= Autobianchi Bianchina =

- Autobianchi Bianchina

Overview
- Manufacturer: Autobianchi
- Also called: Fiat Bianchina; Neckar Panorama
- Production: 1957–1970
- Assembly: Italy: Desio, Milan; West Germany: Heilbronn (NSU Automobil AG)
- Designer: Luigi Rapi

Body and chassis
- Class: City car
- Body style: 2-door saloon (Berlina); 2-door convertible (Trasformabile and Cabriolet); 3-door estate (Panoramica); 3-door van (Furgoncino)
- Layout: RR layout
- Doors: Suicide (Trasformabile only)
- Related: Fiat 500

Powertrain
- Engine: 479 cc OHV I2; 499 cc OHV I2
- Transmission: 4-speed manual

Dimensions
- Wheelbase: 1,840 mm (72.4 in) (All); 1,940 mm (76.4 in) (Panoramica)
- Length: 3,020 mm (118.9 in) (Berlina, Cabriolet); 2,985 mm (117.5 in) (Trasformabile); 3,225 mm (127.0 in) (Panoramica)
- Width: 1,340 mm (52.8 in) (All)
- Height: 1,320 mm (52.0 in) (All); 1,330 mm (52.4 in) (Panoramica)
- Curb weight: 530 kg (1,168 lb) (Berlina); 510 kg (1,124 lb) (Trasformabile); 585 kg (1,290 lb) (Panoramica); 535 kg (1,179 lb) (Cabriolet)

Chronology
- Successor: Autobianchi A112

The Autobianchi Bianchina is a minicar produced by the Italian automaker Autobianchi, based on the Fiat 500's chassis and mechanicals. It was available in various configurations: Berlina (saloon), Cabriolet (roadster), Trasformabile (fixed profile convertible), Panoramica (station wagon), and Furgoncino (van). The car was presented to the public on 16 September 1957 at the Museum of Science and Technology in Milan.

Initially, the car was equipped with the smallest Fiat engine, air-cooled 479 cc, producing 15 PS (11 kW). In 1959, the engine power was increased to 16.5 PS (12.1 kW) and in 1960, the cabriolet version was launched.

In the same year, the Trasformabile, whose engine cylinder capacity was increased to 499 cc and 17.5 PS (12.9 kW), was made available in a Special version with bicolour paint and an engine enhanced to 21 PS (15.4 kW). This body style featured a fixed B-pillar and partial roof, like the rest of the opening was covered with a foldable fabric hood, while the Cabriolet version had no B-pillar. The Trasformabile was the only version to feature suicide doors, and in 1962, it was replaced by a four-seat saloon. The engine and chassis were the same in both.

In 1965, a minor facelift was made and in the Berlina, the regular engine gained a half horsepower.

In France, the various Bianchina models were sold under different names: the Berlina became the Lutèce, the Familiare the Texane, and the Cabriolet was marketed as the Eden Roc. In the United States, the importer marketed them with Fiat badging rather than as Autobianchis. The Panorama was also assembled by Neckar Automobilwerke AG in West Germany as the "Neckar Panorama".

== Production ==
Bianchina models

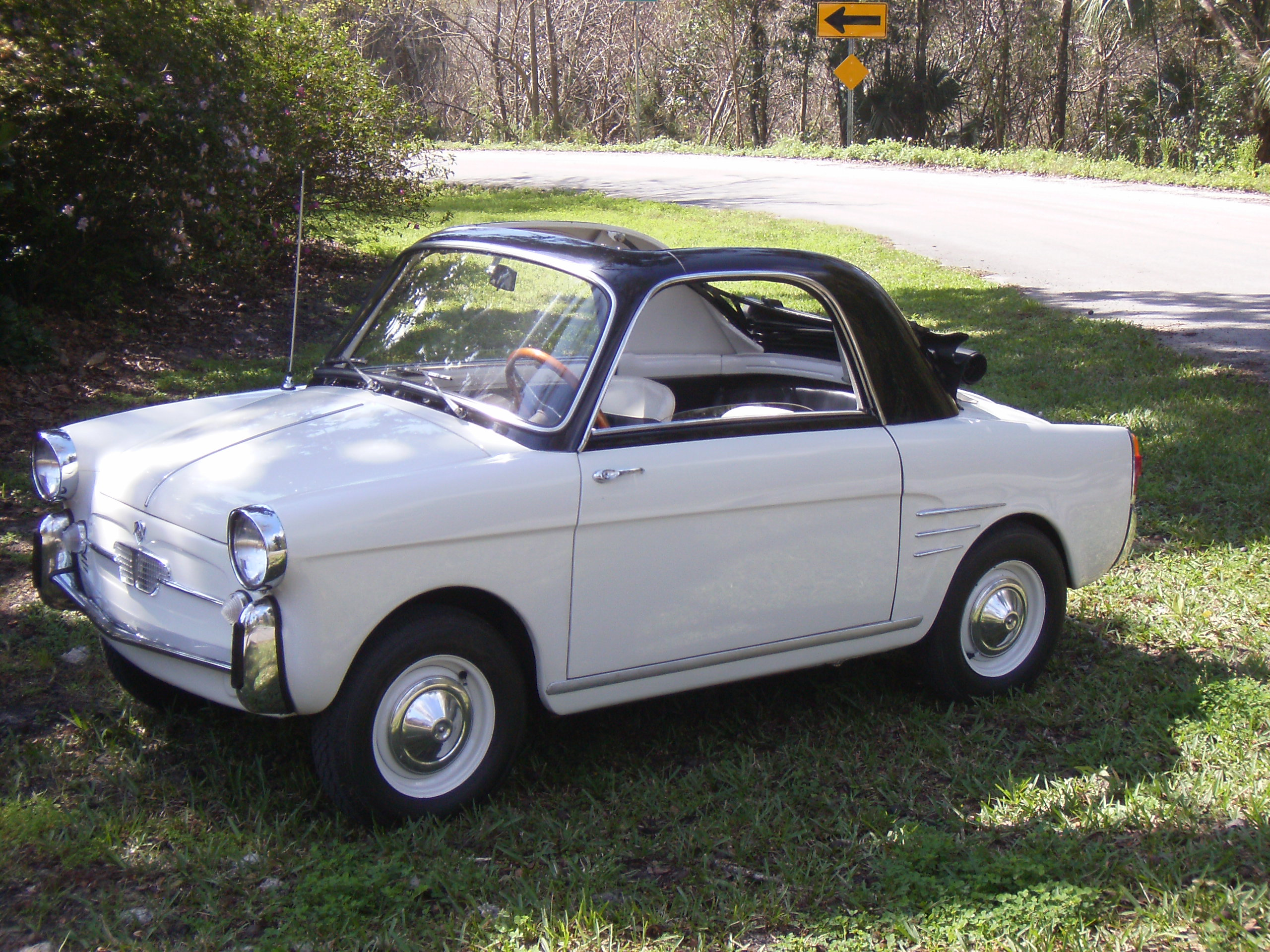
Trasformabile

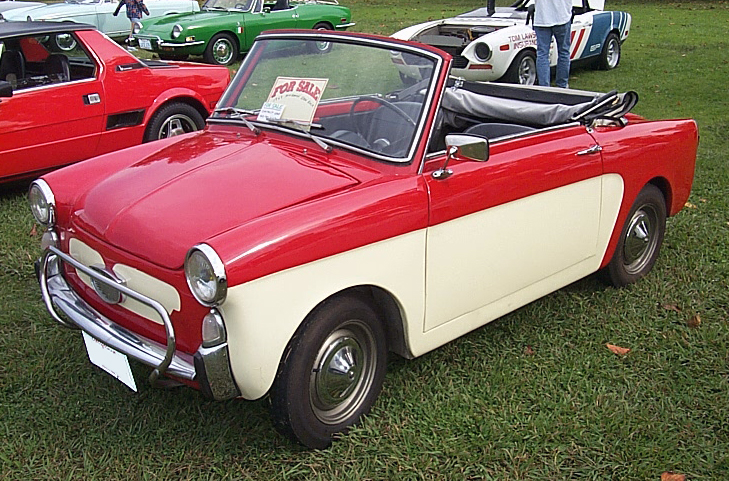
Cabriolet

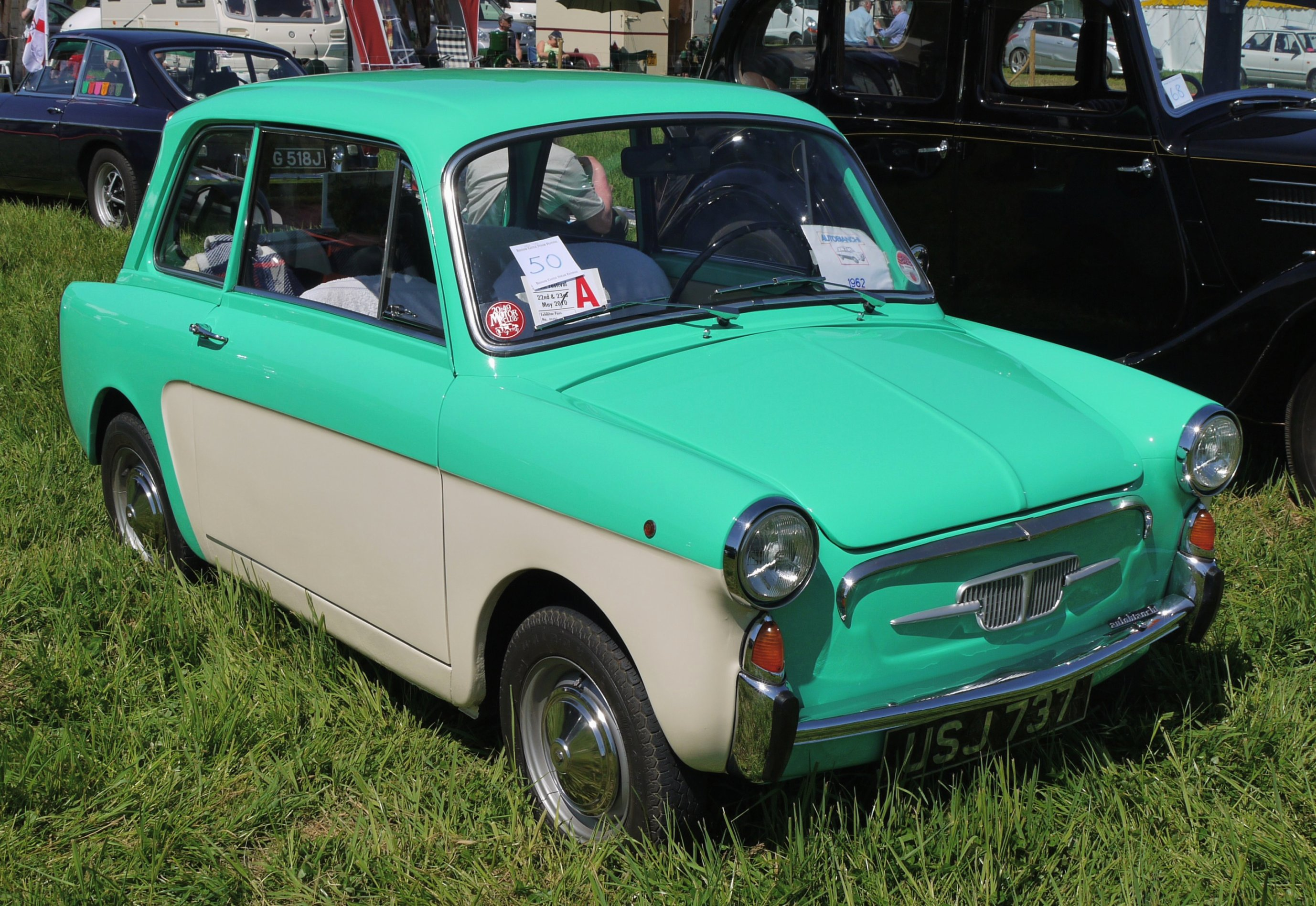
Berlina

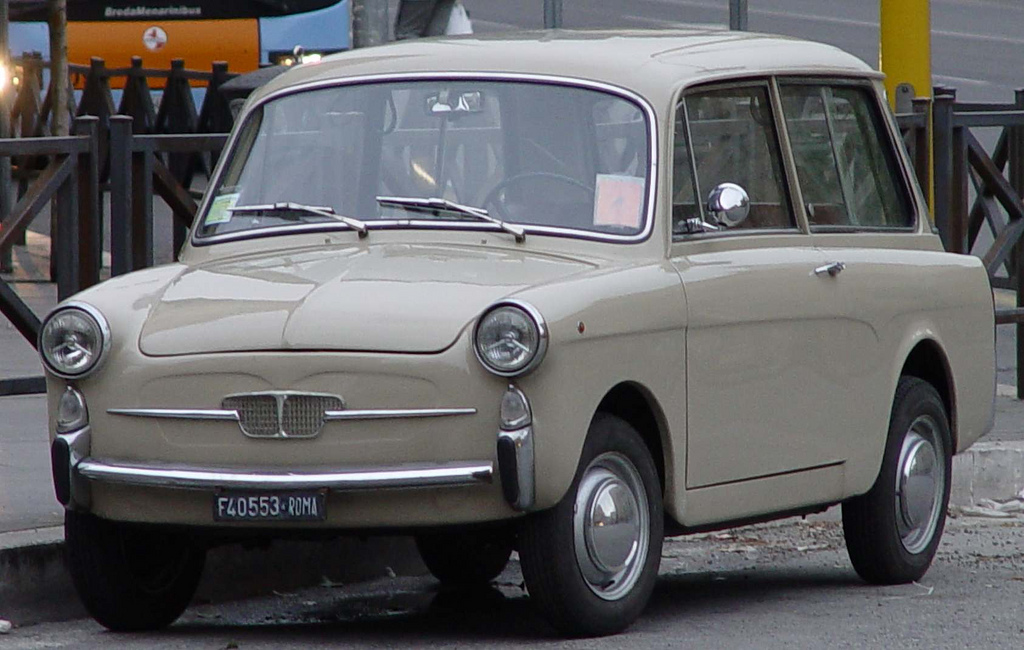
Panoramica

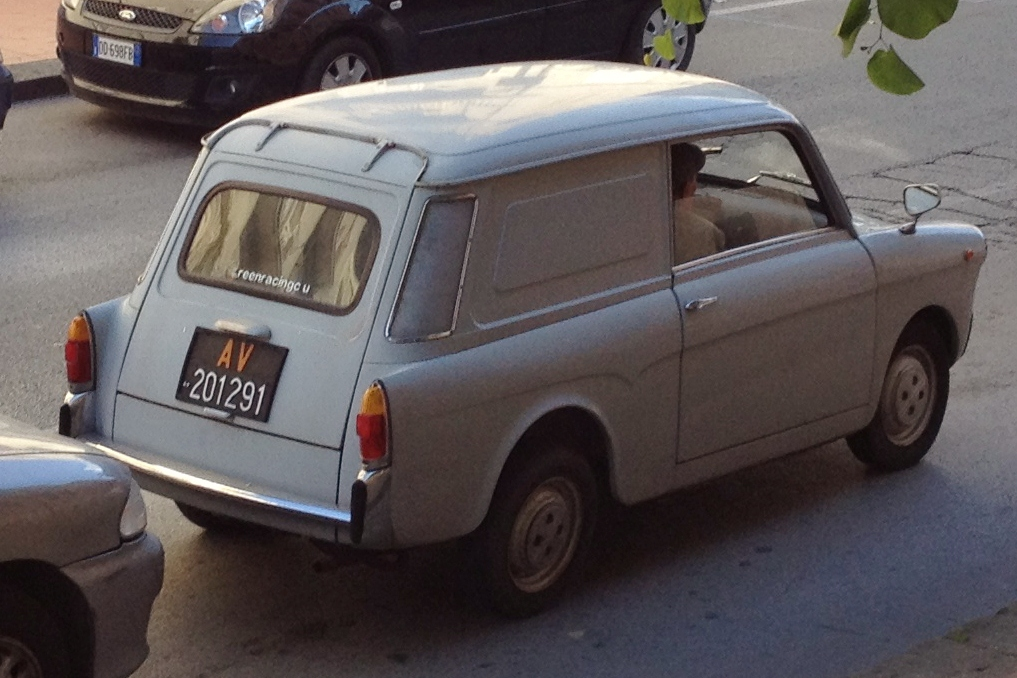
Furgoncino (low roof)

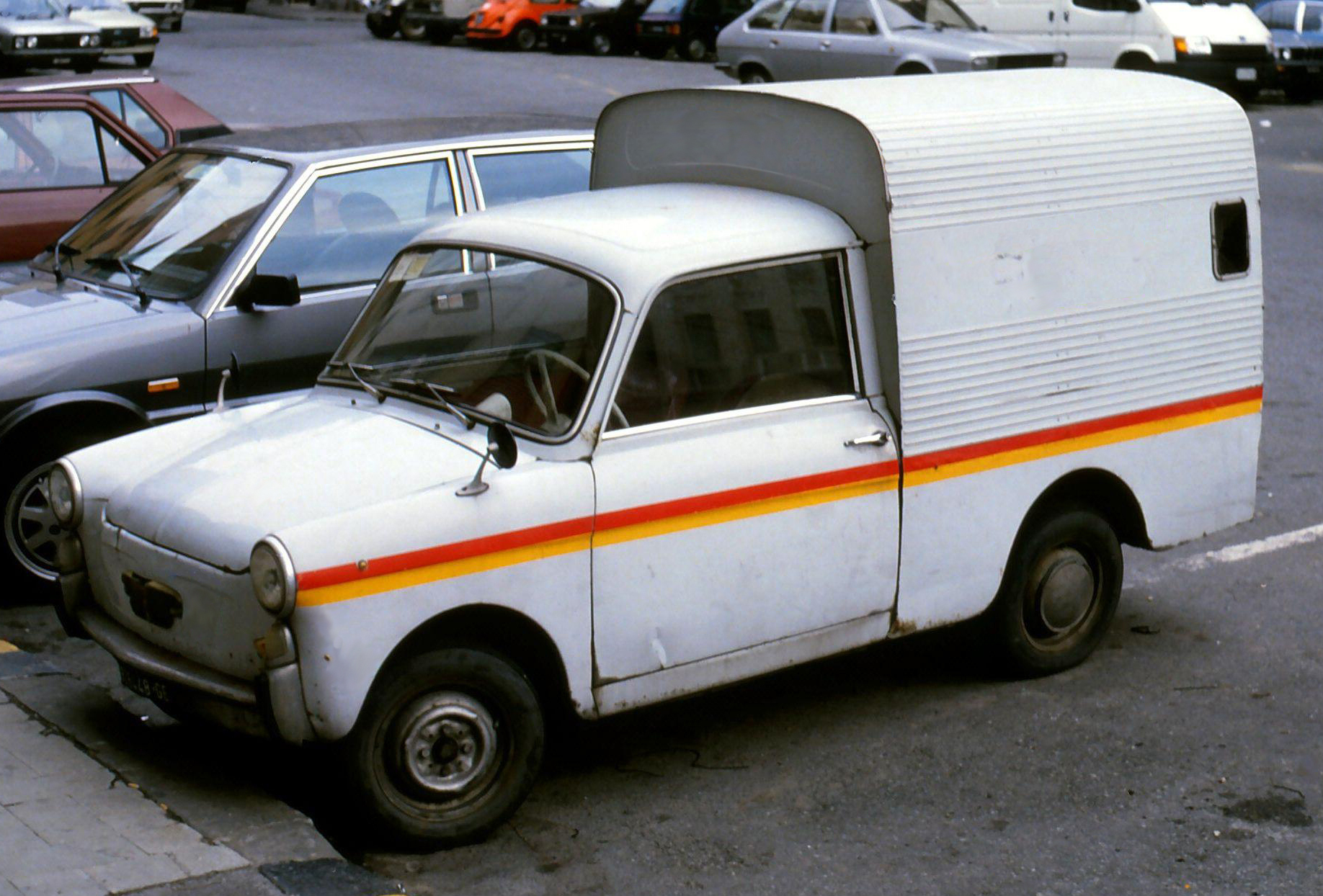
Furgoncino (tall roof)

The Bianchina was produced from 1957 to 1970, for a total volume of approximately 275,000.

Model	Years produced	Power (hp (metric))	Capacity (cc)	Production
Trasformabile series 1	1957–1958	15	479	17,000
Trasformabile series 2	1959–1960	16.5	479	10,000
Trasformabile series 3	1961–1962	17.5	499	7,000
Trasformabile Special	1959–1962	21	499	1,500
Cabriolet series 1	1960	21	499	1,050
Cabriolet series 2 D	1961–1964	21	499	5,500
Cabriolet series 3 F	1965–1969	21	499	2,750
Berlina D	1962–1964	17.5	499	26,500
Berlina F	1965–1969	18	499	33,500
Berlina Special D	1962–1964	21	499	4,000
Berlina Special F	1965–1969	21	499	5,000
Panoramica D	1960–1964	17.5	499	75,000
Panoramica F	1965–1969	17.5	499	85,000
Panoramica sun roof	1960–1969	17.5	499	
Furgoncino van, low roof	1965–1970	17.5	499	
Furgonetta van, tall roof	1970–1977	17.5	499	

Source: Club Bianchina and Bianchina Classic Club

== Autobianchi Bianchina Giardiniera ==
Autobianchi also used the Bianchina name for the Autobianchi Bianchina Giardiniera.

== In popular culture ==
The 1966 movie How to Steal a Million with Audrey Hepburn and Peter O'Toole features Hepburn's character driving a red Autobianchi Bianchina cabriolet.

Italian comedy character Ugo Fantozzi, created by Paolo Villaggio and protagonist of television monologues, short stories, and films, famously drives a white Bianchina, usually somewhat damaged and with a four-leaf clover decal on the left side. The car is known for its tendency to become badly damaged throughout these stories.

A pink with black polka dots Trasformabile is featured in the 1986 music video, "Nobody's Fool," by glam metal band, Cinderella.

In the animation film Despicable Me 2, the car of Lucy Wilde resembles a Bianchina Trasformabile.

The car is owned and driven by Lolita Lobosco in the eponymous Italian detective series broadcast in the UK by Channel 4 in its Walter Presents series (S1 E2, 01:01:30).
