= Vignale Gamine =

Car produced by Carrozzeria Vignale

Overview
- Manufacturer: Vignale
- Also called: Fiat 500 Spider Vignale
- Production: 1967–1971; 800-900 built (estimate)
- Designer: Alfredo Vignale

Body and chassis
- Class: City car (A)
- Body style: 2-door roadster
- Layout: Rear-engine, rear-wheel-drive
- Related: Fiat 500

Powertrain
- Engine: 499.5 cc Fiat I2
- Transmission: 4-speed manual

Dimensions
- Wheelbase: 1,840 mm (72 in)
- Length: 3,020 mm (119 in)
- Width: 1,300 mm (51 in)
- Height: 1,190 mm (47 in)
- Curb weight: 450 kg (990 lb)

The Vignale Gamine is a small rear-engined car. It was produced by Carrozzeria Vignale from 1967 until 1971, based on the Fiat 500F. The idea and initial orders for an open-top 2-seater roadster came from Mr Osvaldo Geminiani from Naples, owner of G.A.M. in Monte Carlo. Styling was by Alfredo Vignale. The retro-design of the Gamine relates to the 1930s Fiat 508 Balilla Coppa d'Oro. A hard-top was offered at an extra cost, and is considered these days to be quite rare.

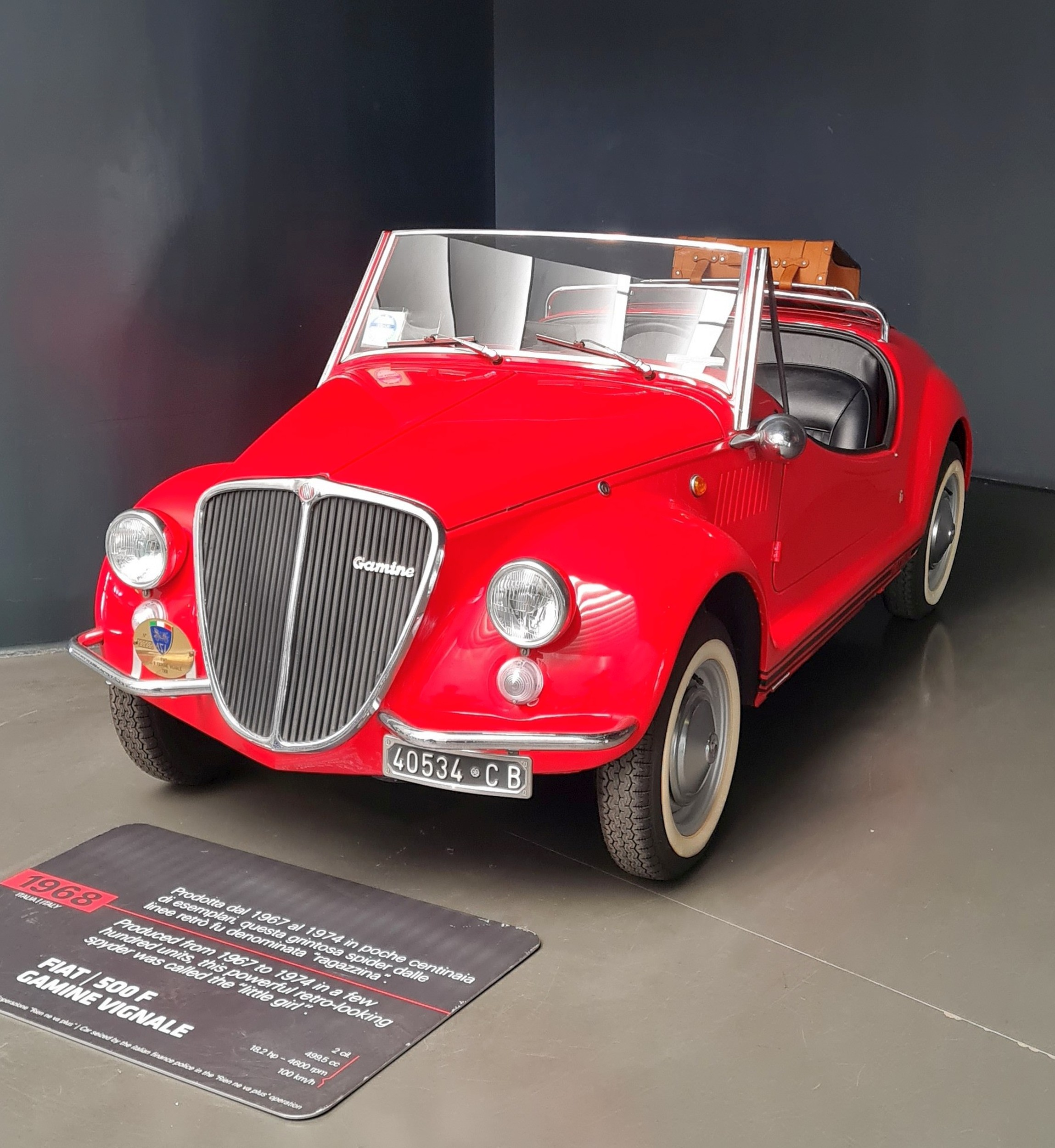
Vignale Gamine

It was powered by a 2-cylinder, air-cooled engine of 499.5 cc from the 500F. There was only one engine version producing 21.5 PS (15.8 kW; 21.2 bhp). According to official data, the car had a top speed of 97 km/h (60 mph).

The Gamine never met its sales expectations. In fact, the slow sales and the financial problems caused by the bankruptcy of the G.A.M. drove Carrozzeria Vignale out of business. It forced Alfredo Vignale to sell his Carrozzeria to De Tomaso, which manufactured the Pantera sports car there.
