= Front-wheel drive =

Automotive transmission where the engine drives the front wheels only

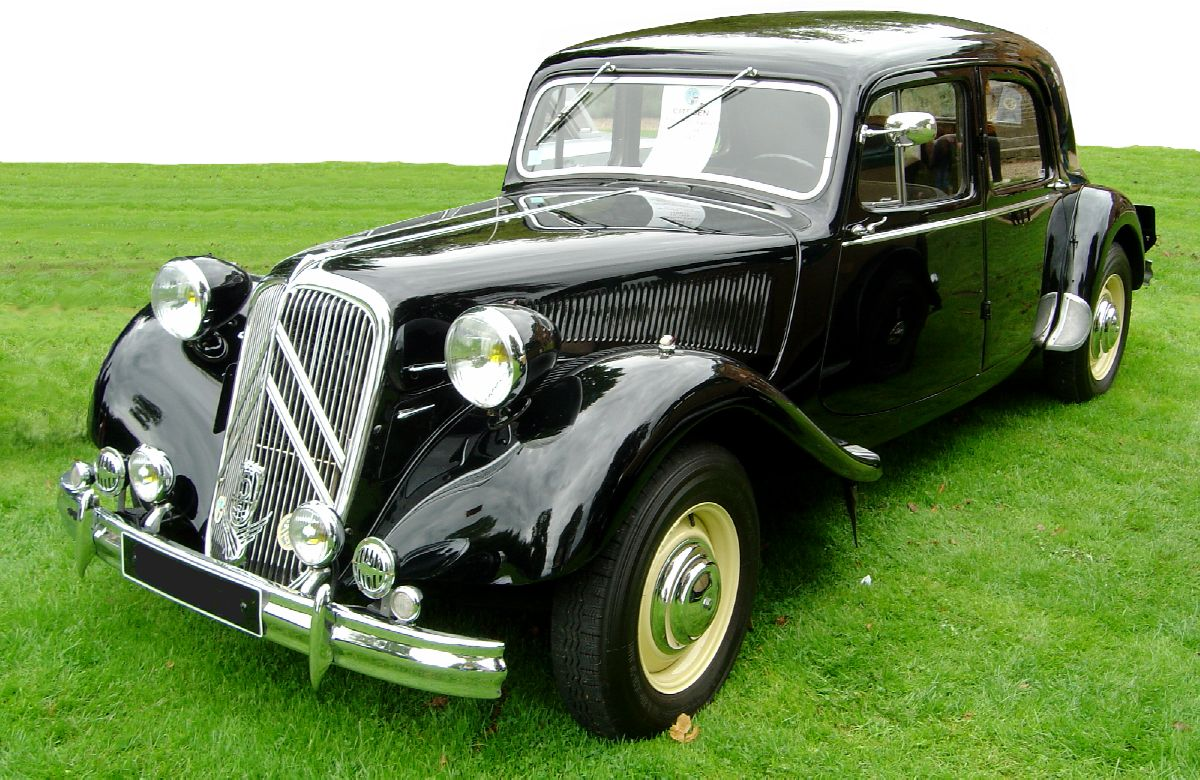
The historic 1934 Citroën Traction Avant. Its model name literally means front-wheel-drive, one of the car's break-through innovations.

Front-wheel drive (FWD) is a form of engine and transmission layout used in motor vehicles, in which the engine drives the front wheels only. Most modern front-wheel-drive vehicles feature a transverse engine, rather than the conventional longitudinal engine arrangement generally found in rear-wheel-drive and four-wheel-drive vehicles.

== Location of engine and transmission ==
By far the most common layout for a front-wheel-drive car is with the engine and transmission at the front of the car, mounted transversely.

Other layouts of front-wheel drive that have been occasionally produced are a front-engine mounted longitudinally, a mid-engine layout and a rear-engine layout.

== History ==
=== Prior to 1900 ===
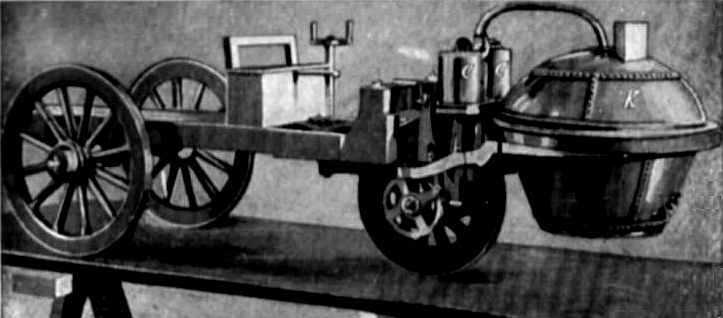
Nicholas Cugnot's 1769 steam-powered gun-tractor

Experiments with front-wheel-drive cars date to the early days of the automobile. The world's first self-propelled vehicle, Nicolas-Joseph Cugnot's 1769/1770 "fardier à vapeur", was a three-wheeled steam-powered dray for heavy artillery. It had a single front wheel, which was driven by a steam engine which was part of the pivoting assembly of boiler, engine and transmission. Walter Hancock used a similar configuration in his first Infant steam carriage of c.1827.

The first vehicle built with drive to two front wheels appears to have been the Bollée-Dalifol steam tram of 1876. This had four-wheel drive and four-wheel steering and could move around off the rails. It was too heavy for the tramway and frightened horses, so never entered service.

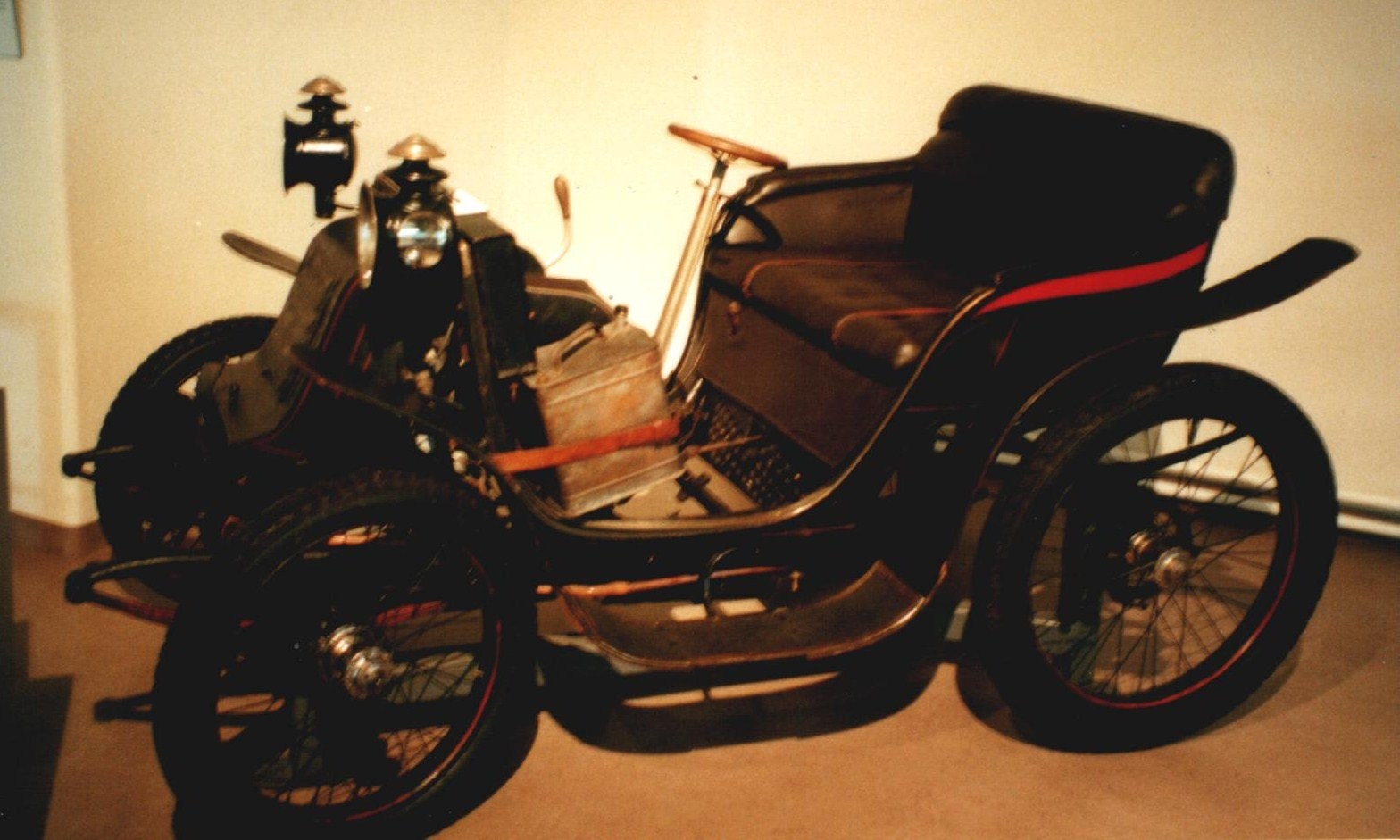
1898 Gräf car

Sometime between 1895 and 1898 the Austrian brothers and bicycle producers Franz, Heinrich and Karl Gräf (see Gräf & Stift) commissioned the technician Josef Kainz to build a voiturette with a one-cylinder De Dion-Bouton engine fitted in the front of the vehicle, powering the front axle. It is possibly the world's first front-wheel-drive automobile, but it never saw series production, with just one prototype made.

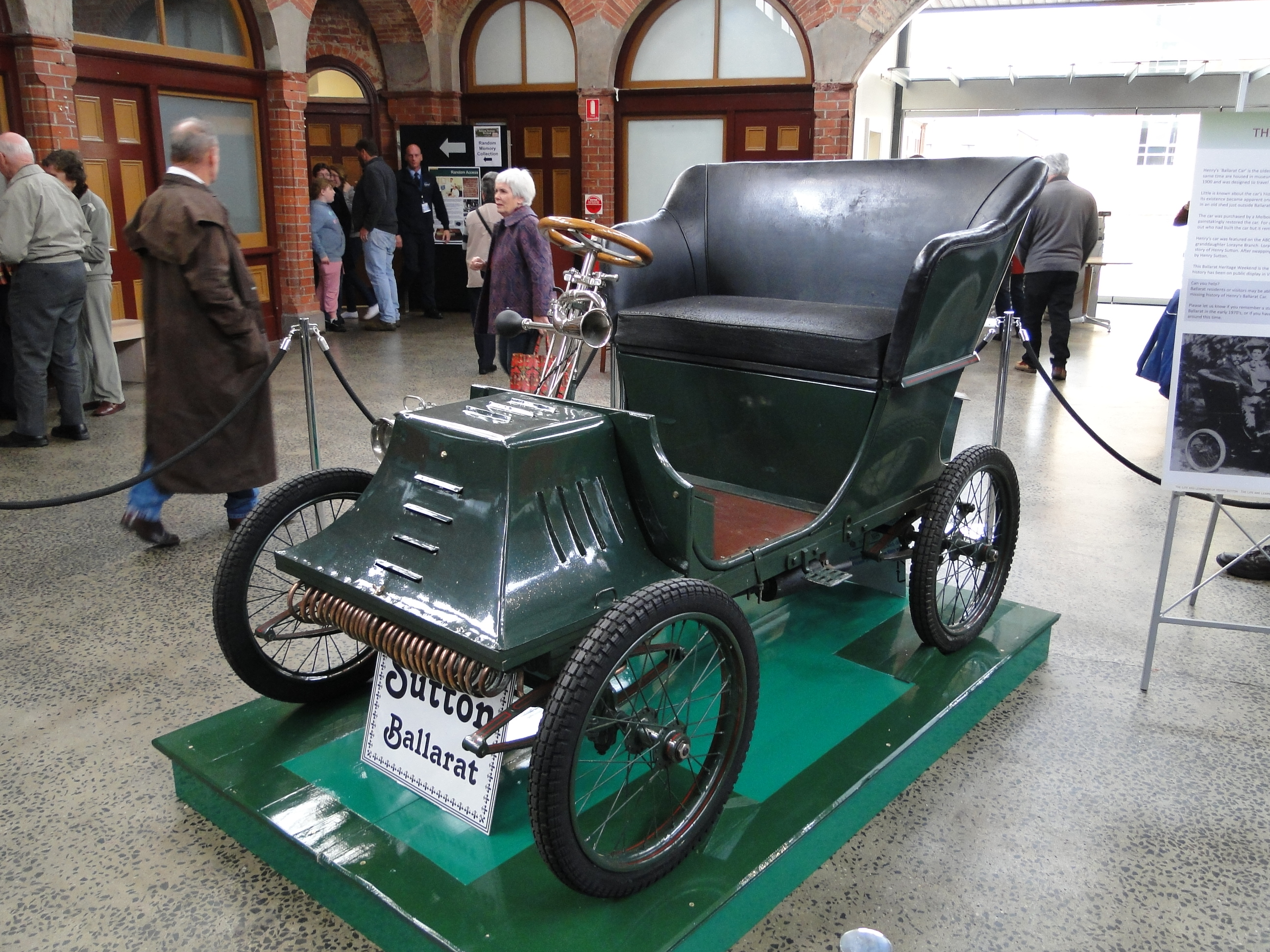
1899 Sutton Autocar

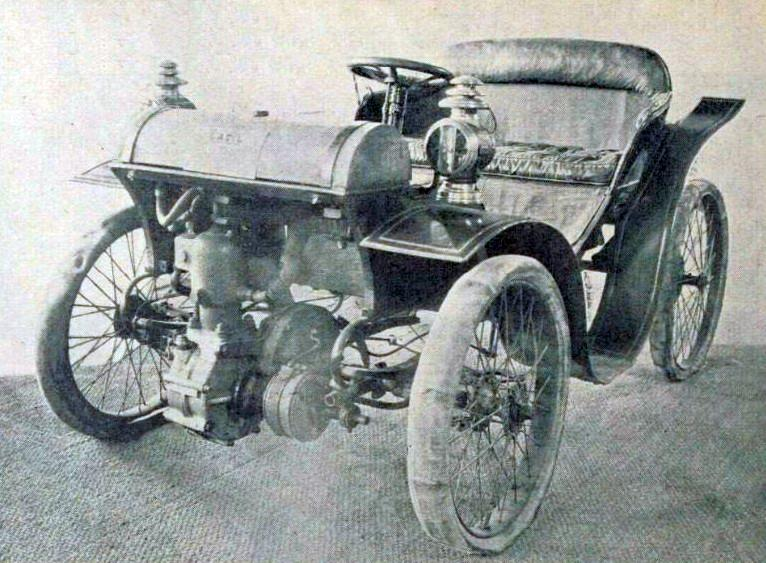
1899 Latil

In 1898, Latil, in France, devised a front-wheel-drive system for motorising horse-drawn carts.

In 1899 the inventor Henry Sutton designed and built one of Australia's first cars, called The Sutton Autocar. This car may have been the first front-wheel-drive car in the world. Henry's car was reported in the English press at the time and featured in the English magazine Autocar, after which the car was named. Two prototypes of the Autocar were built and the Austral Otis Company was going to go into business with Henry to manufacture Henry's car but the cost of the car was too prohibitive as it could not compete with the cost of imported cars.

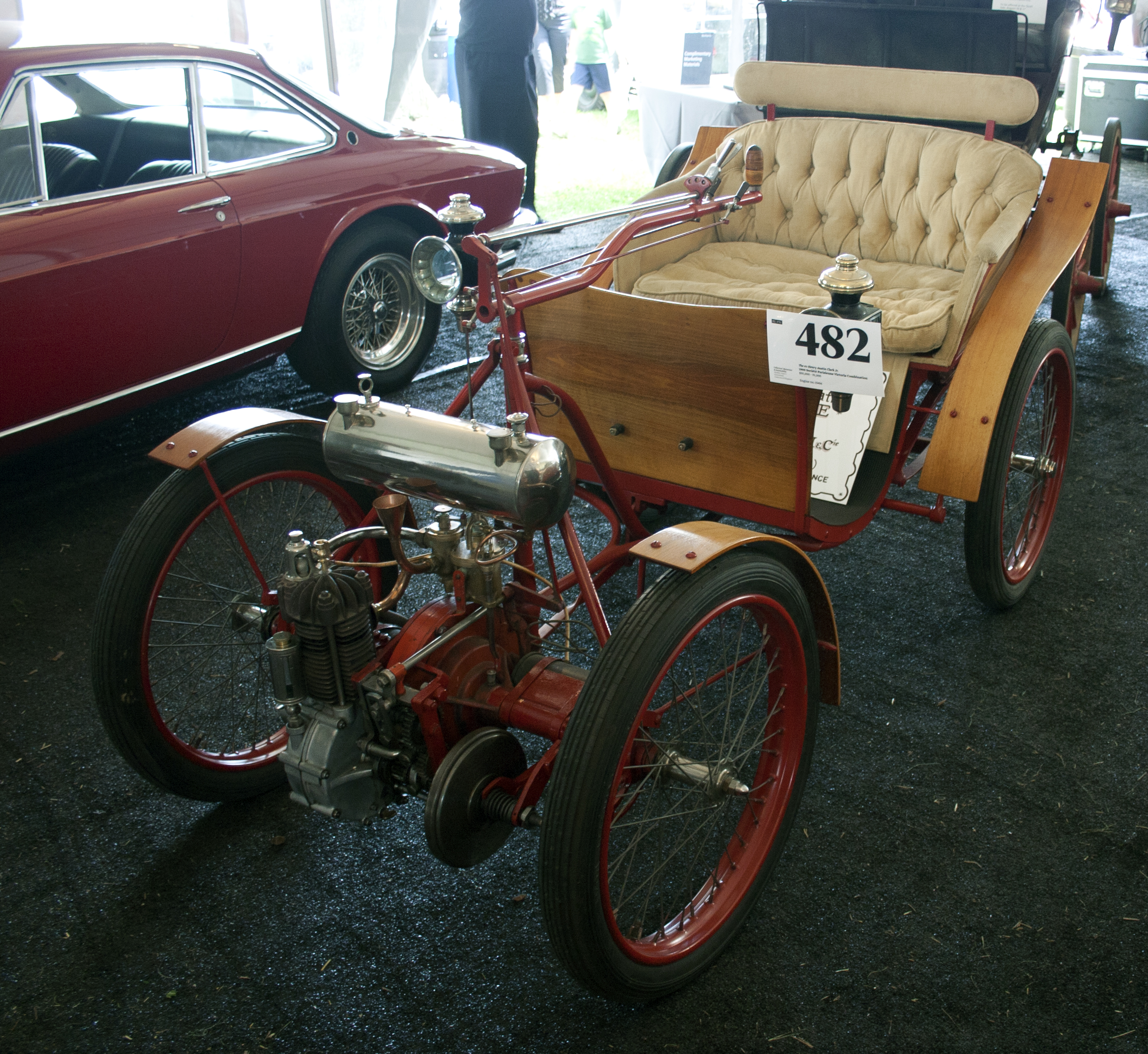
1898–1901 Victoria Combination

In 1898–99, the French manufacturer Société Parisienne patented their front-wheel-drive articulated vehicle concept which they manufactured as a Victoria Combination. It was variously powered by 1.75 or 2.5 horsepower (1.30 or 1.86 kW) De Dion-Bouton engine or a water cooled 3.5 horsepower (2.6 kW) Aster engine. The engine was mounted on the front axle and so was rotated by the tiller steering. The name Victoria Combination described the lightweight, two-seater trailer commonly known as a Victoria, combined with the rear axle and drive mechanism from a motor tricycle that was placed in front to achieve front wheel drive. It also known as the Eureka. By 1899 Victoria Combinations were participating in motoring events such as the 371 km (231 mi) Paris–Saint-Malo race, finishing 23rd overall and second(last) in the class. In October a Victoria Combination won its class in the Paris-Rambouillet-Paris event, covering the 100-kilometre course at 26 km/h (16 mph). In 1900 it completed 240 kilometres (150 mi) non-stop at 29 km/h (18 mph). When production ceased in mid-1901, over 400 units had been sold for 3,000 Francs (circa $600) each.

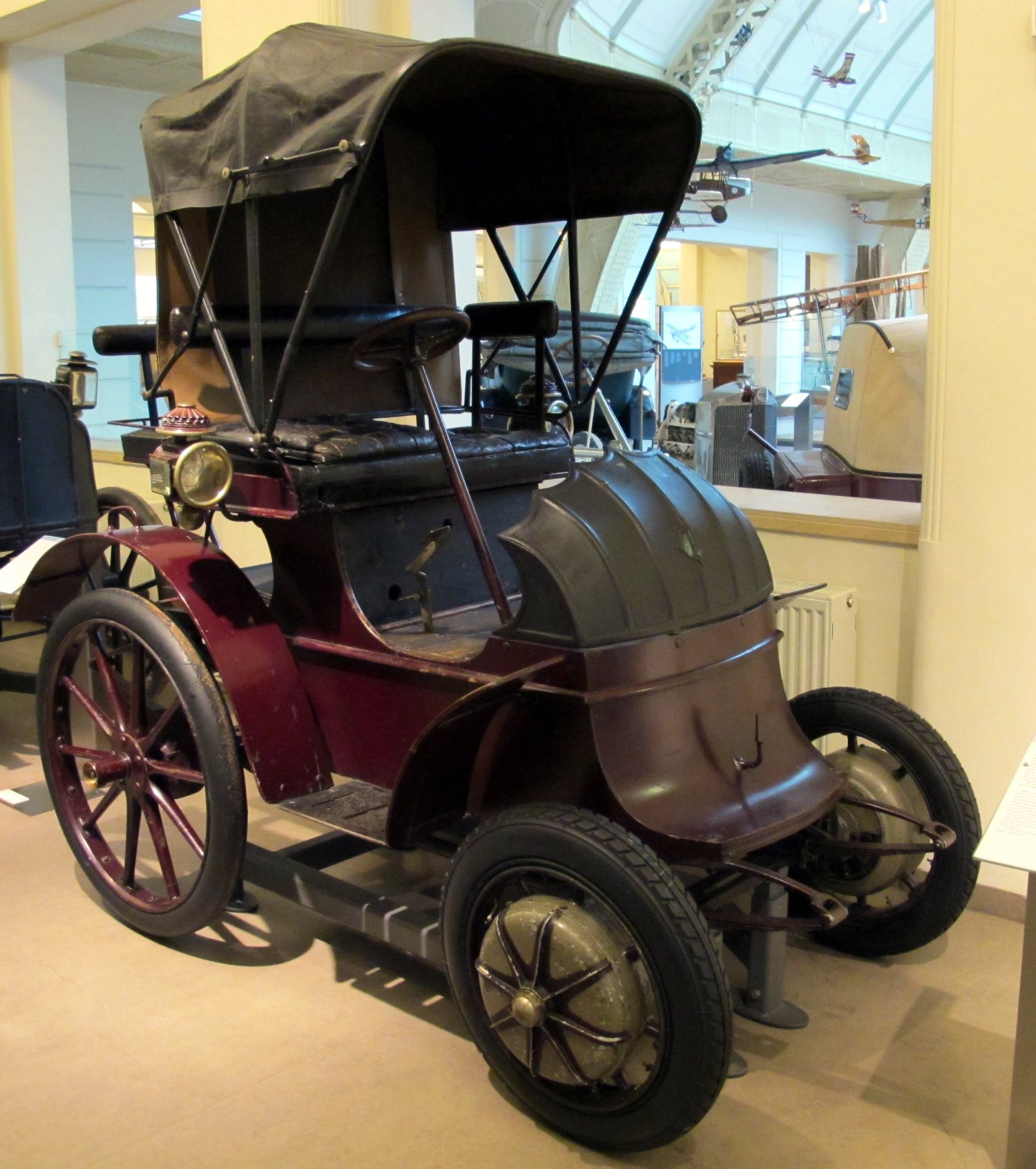
1900 Lohner–Porsche

A different concept was the Lohner–Porsche of 1897 with an electric motor in each front wheel, produced by Lohner-Werke in Vienna. It was developed by Ferdinand Porsche in 1897 based on a concept developed by American inventor Wellington Adams. Porsche also raced it in 1897.

Around 1900 the London General Omnibus Company (LGOC) used a similar approach to motorise a horse-drawn omnibus but using steam engines rather than electric motors. Front and three-quarter nearside views show a central boiler with flexible hoses to and from steam engines directly driving the steered front wheels. It was not put into service and was succeeded by tests in 1903 of a Fischer petrol-electric double-decker and in 1904 a Clarkson steam single-decker.

=== 1900–1920 ===
J. Walter Christie of the United States patented a design for a front-wheel-drive car, the first prototype of which he built in 1904. He promoted and demonstrated several such vehicles, some with transversely mounted engines, by racing at various speedways in the United States, and even competed in the 1906 Vanderbilt Cup and the French Grand Prix. In 1912 he began manufacturing a line of wheeled fire engine tractors which used his front-wheel-drive system, but due to lack of sales this venture failed.

In Australia in 1915 G.J. Hoskins designed and was granted a patent for his front-wheel-drive system. Based in Burwood NSW Mr Hoskins was a prominent member of the Sydney motoring industry and invented a system that used a "spherical radial gear" that was fitted to what is believed to have been a Standard (built by the Standard Motor Company of England). A photo of the car with the system fitted is available from the Mitchell Library and the patent design drawing is still available from the Australian Patent Office. reference; "Gilltraps Australian Cars from 1879 – A history of cars built in Australia" (authors Gilltrap T and M) ISBN 0 85558 936 1 (Golden Press Pty Ltd)

=== 1920–1930 ===
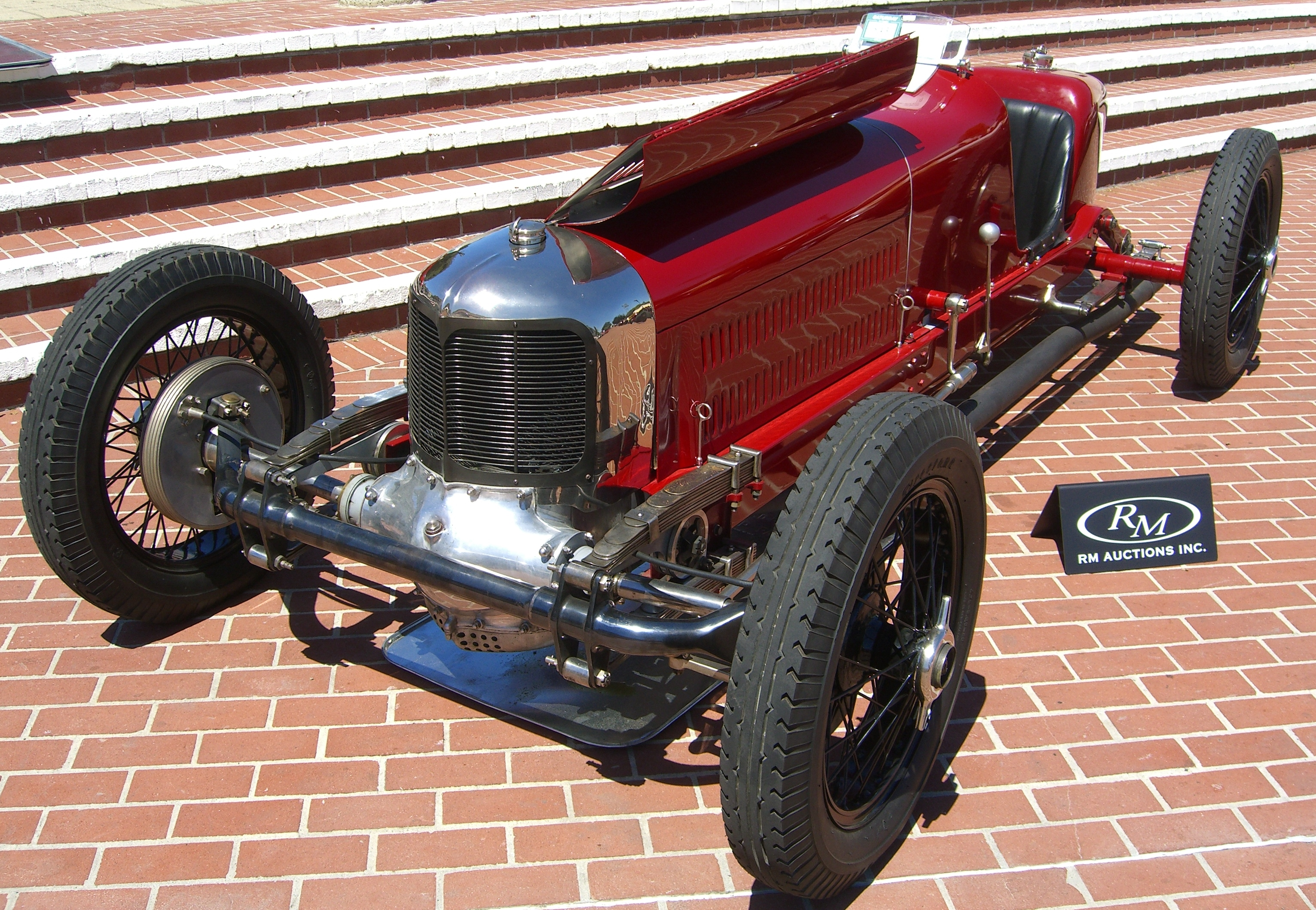
1925 Miller 122 Indianapolis 500 front-wheel-drive racer

The next application of front-wheel drive was the supercharged Alvis 12/50 racing car designed by George Thomas Smith-Clarke and William M. Dunn of Alvis Cars of the United Kingdom. This vehicle was entered in the 1925 Kop Hill Climb in Princes Risborough in Buckinghamshire on 28 March 1925. Harry Arminius Miller of Menomonie, Wisconsin designed the Miller 122 front-wheel drive race-car that was entered in the 1925 Indianapolis 500, which was held at the Indianapolis Motor Speedway on Saturday, 30 May 1925.

However, the idea of front-wheel drive languished outside the motor racing arena as few manufacturers attempted the same for production automobiles. Alvis Cars did introduce a commercial model of the front-wheel drive 12/50 racer in 1928, but it was not a success.

In France, Jean-Albert Grégoire and Pierre Fenaille developed the Tracta constant-velocity joint in 1926. In October 1928 a sensation at the 22nd Paris Motor Show was the Bucciali TAV-6. Six years before the appearance of the Citroën Traction Avant and more than two years before the launch of the DKW F1, the Bucciali TAV-6 featured front-wheel drive. Both German makers DKW in 1931 and Adler in 1933 bought Tracta licenses for their first front-wheel-drive cars. Imperia in Belgium and Rosengart in France manufactured the Adler under the licenses using the Tracta CV joints. During the second World War, all British vehicles, U.S. Jeeps made by Ford and Dodge command cars used Tracta CV joints. Russia and Germany also used the Tracta CV joints, but without the licensing.

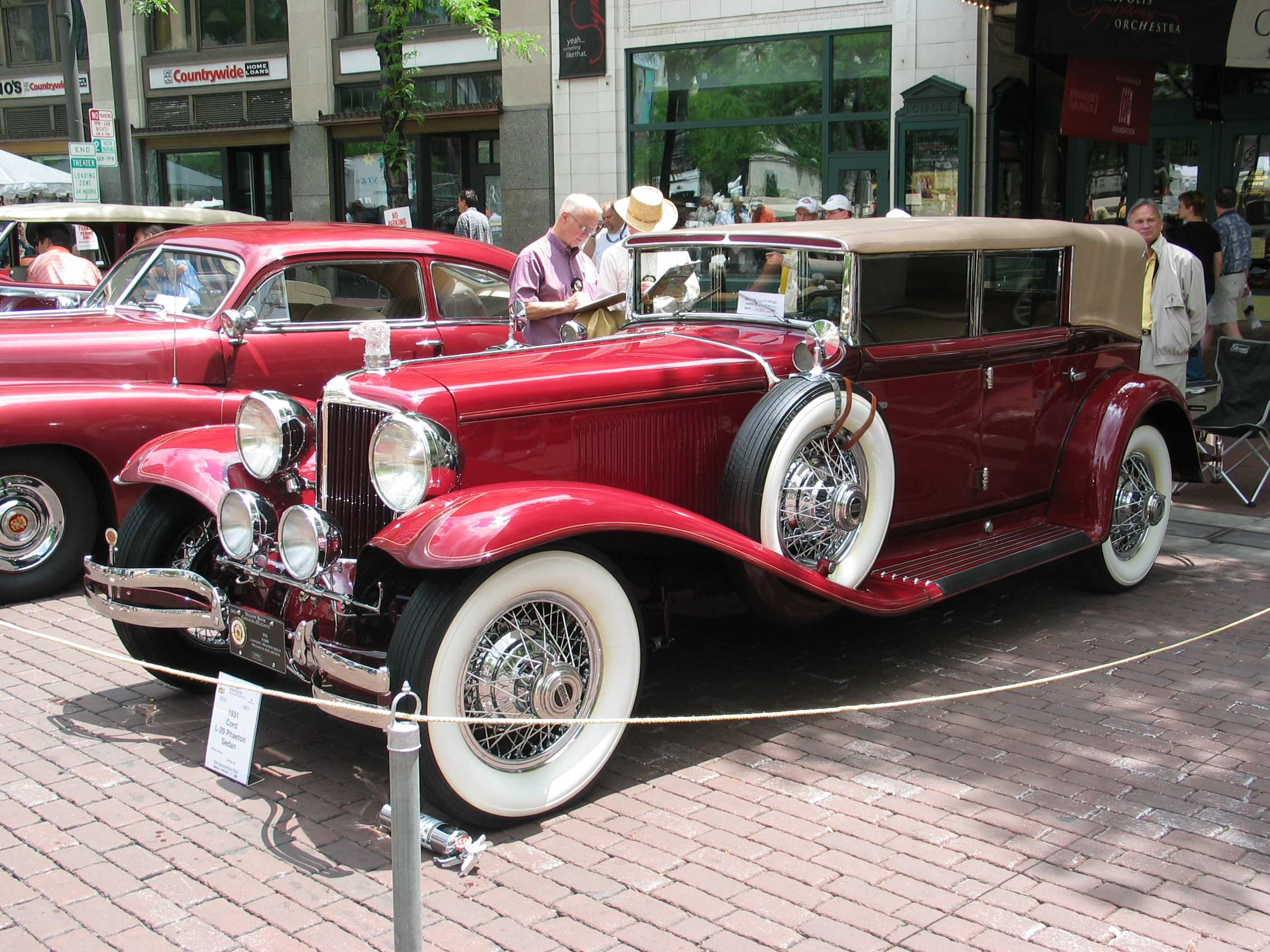
The 1929 Cord L-29 (Phaeton) was the US's first front-wheel-drive production car, as well as the world's first to sport constant-velocity joints.

The United States only saw a few limited production experiments like the Cord L-29 of 1929, the first American front-wheel-drive car to be offered to the public, and a few months later the Ruxton automobile. The Cord L-29's drive system was again inspired by racing, copying from the Indianapolis 500-dominating racers, using the same de Dion layout and inboard brakes.

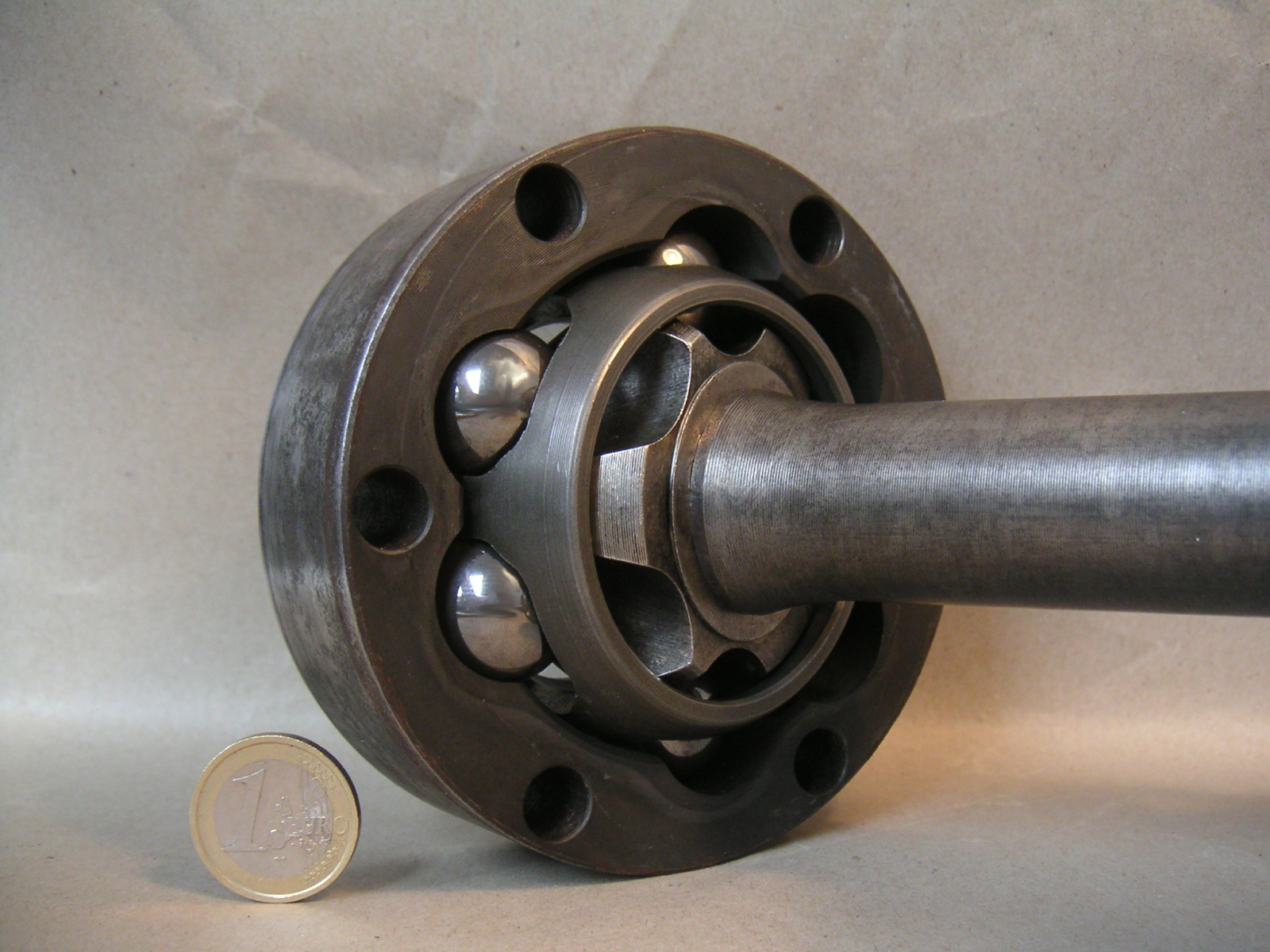
Constant-velocity joints allow a drive shaft to smoothly transmit power through a variable angle, at constant rotational speed.

Moreover, the Auburn (Indiana) built Cord was the first ever front-wheel drive production car to use constant-velocity joints. These very specific components allow motive power to be delivered to steered wheels more smoothly than universal joints, and have become common on almost every front-wheel-drive car, including on the front axles of almost every four-wheel or all-wheel drive vehicle.

Neither automobile was particularly successful in the open market. In spite of the Cord's hallmark innovation, using CV joints, and being competitively priced against contemporaneous alternatives, the buyers demographic were expecting more than the car's 80 mph (130 km/h) top speed, and combined with the effect of the Great Depression, by 1932 the Cord L-29 was discontinued, with just 4,400 sold. The 1929 Ruxton sold just 200 cars built that year.

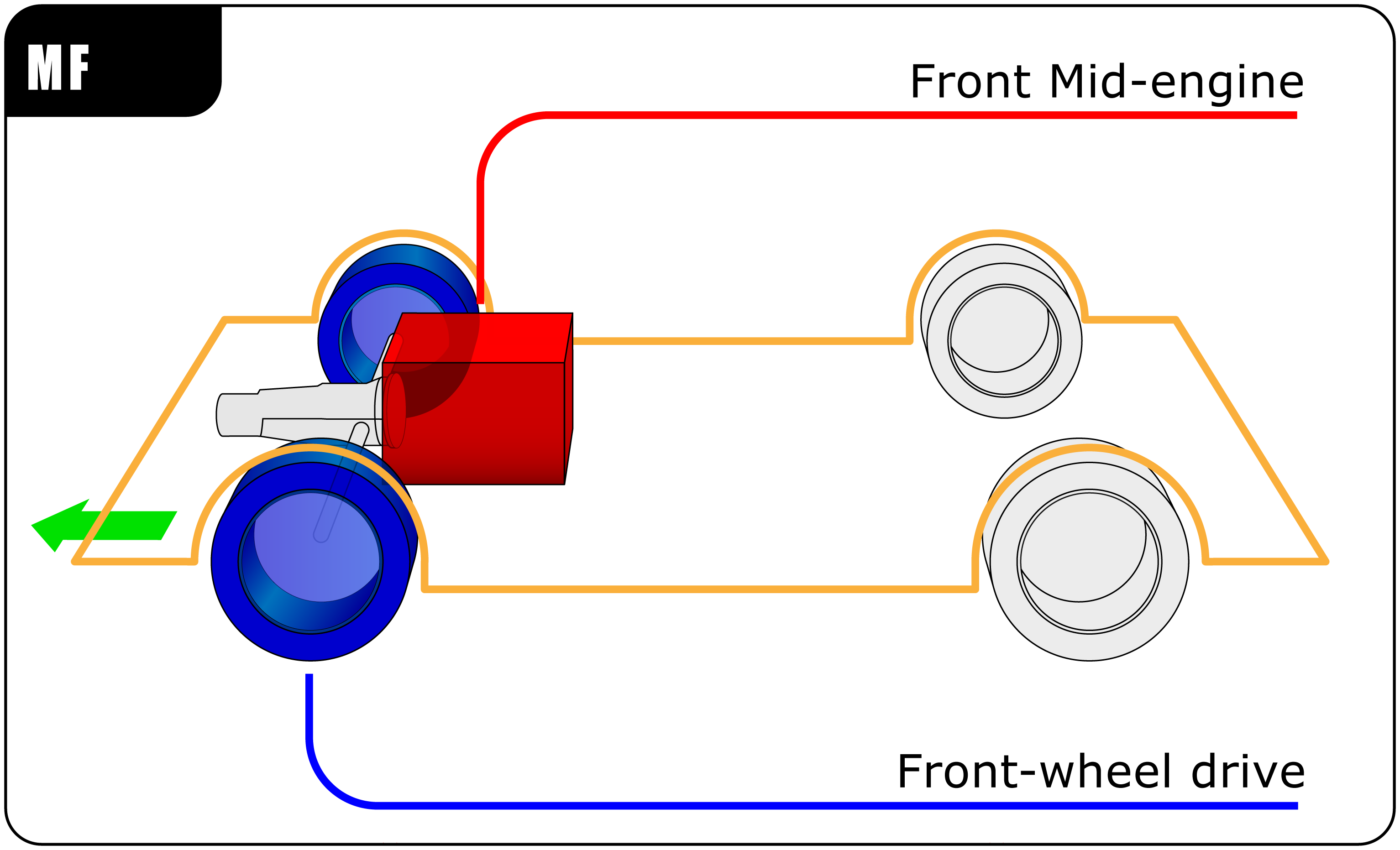
Front-wheel-drive MF layout with engine behind the transmission in the 1930s. Renault widely used this configuration into the 1980s.

=== 1930–1945 ===
The first successful consumer application came in 1929. The BSA (Birmingham Small Arms Company) produced the unique front-wheel-drive BSA three-wheeler. Production continued until 1936 during which time sports and touring models were available. In 1931 the DKW F1 from Germany made its debut, with a transverse-mounted engine behind the front axle. In 1931 and 1932, 4,353 units of the DKW F1 were sold, making it the first front wheel drive vehicle successfully sold in large quantities. Of the successor, the F2, about 27,000 were sold until 1935, and counting all models, until 1942, about 270,000 front wheel cars based on the design were produced by DKW. This design would continue for 3 decades in Germany. Buckminster Fuller adopted rear-engine, front-wheel drive for his three Dymaxion Car prototypes.

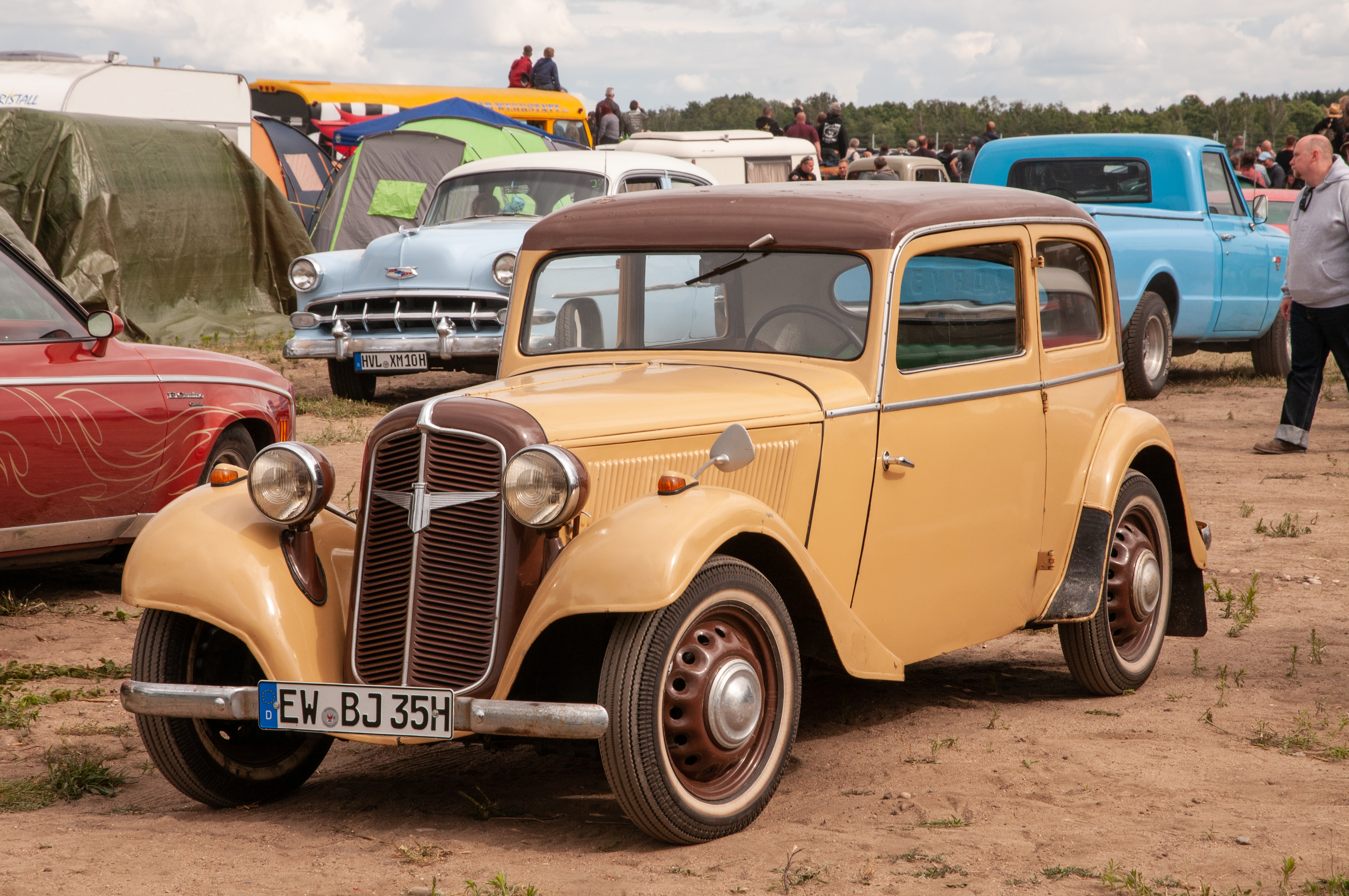
In 1932, Adler (German) launched Trumpf Junior, the earliest front-wheel drive car of which 100,000 units were sold, reaching that in 1939.

Other German car producers followed: Stoewer offered a car with front-wheel drive in 1931, Adler in 1932 and Audi in 1933. Versions of the Adler Trumpf sold five-figure numbers from 1932 to 1938, totalling over 25,600 units. In 1934, Adler added a cheaper, and even more successful Trumpf Junior model, which sold over 100,000 in August 1939, and in the same year Citroën introduced the very successful Traction Avant models in France, over time selling them in the hundred thousands.

Hupmobile made 2 experimental models with front-wheel drive in 1932 and 1934, but neither came into production

In the late 1930s, the Cord 810/812 of the United States managed a bit better than its predecessor one decade earlier. These vehicles featured a layout that places the engine behind the transmission, running "backwards," (save for the Cord, which drove the transmission from the front of the engine). The basic front-wheel-drive layout provides sharp turning, and better weight distribution creates "positive handling characteristics" due to its low polar inertia and relatively favourable weight distribution. (The heaviest component is near the centre of the car, making the main component of its moment of inertia relatively low). Another result of this design is a lengthened chassis.

Except for Citroën, after the 1930s, front-wheel drive would largely be abandoned for the following twenty years. Save the interruption of World War II, Citroën built some 3/4 million Traction Avants through 1957; adding their cheap 2CV people's car in 1948, and introducing an equally front-wheel driven successor for the TA, the DS model, in 1955.

=== 1945–1960 ===
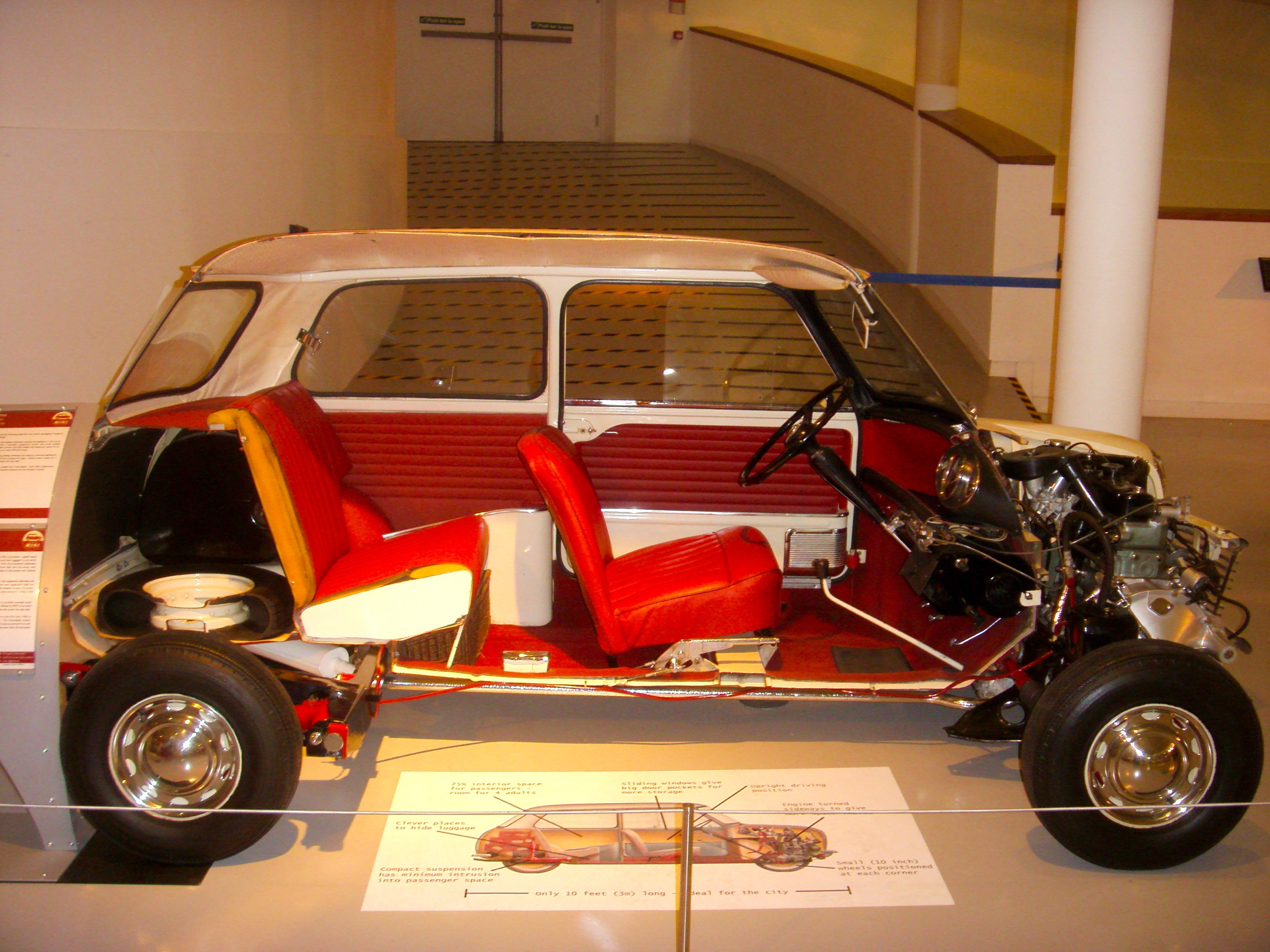
The 1959 Mini with a transverse engine

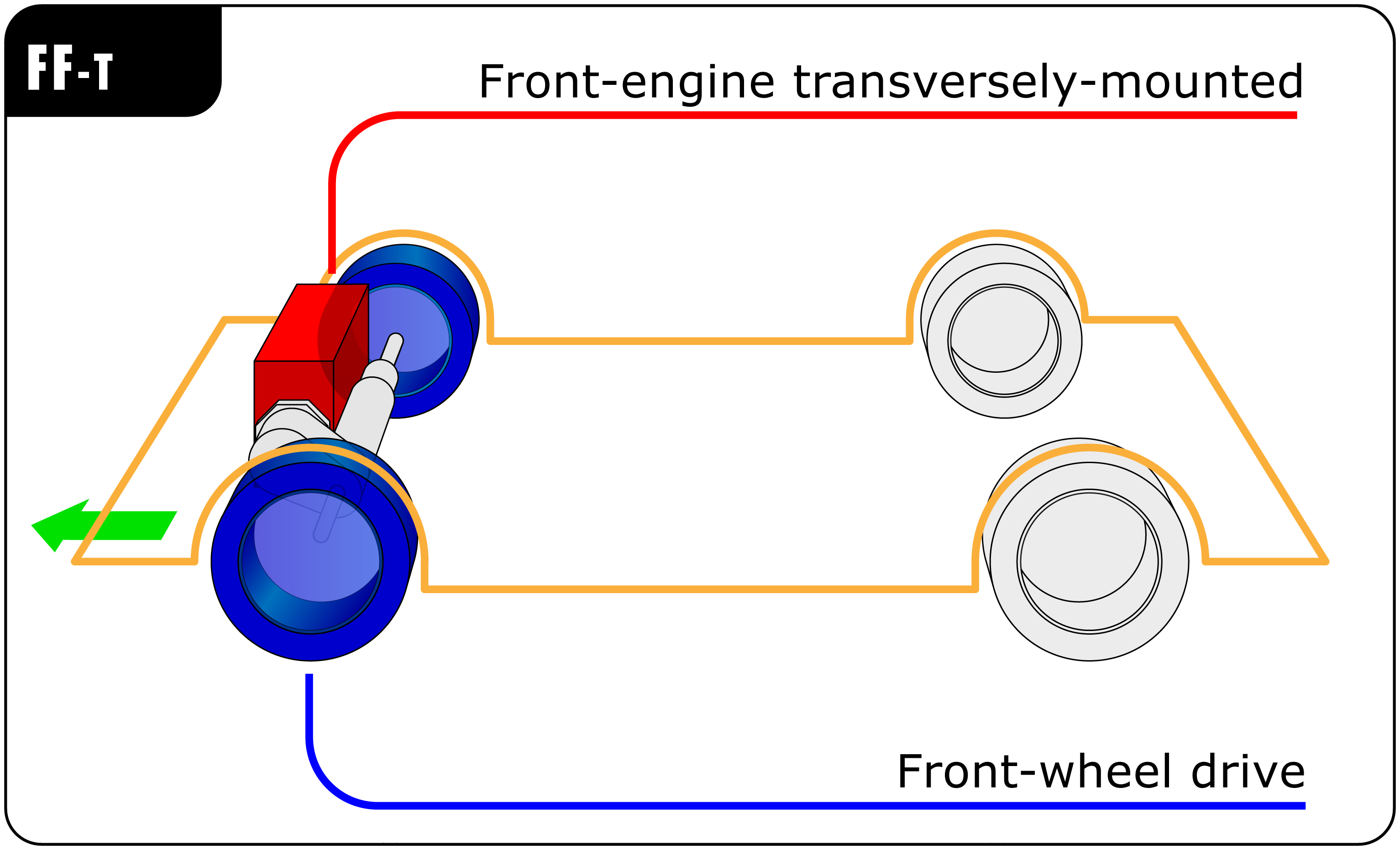
Transverse front-wheel-drive FF layout as pioneered in the Mini is today the most common in mass-market passenger cars.

Front-wheel drive continued with the 1948 Citroën 2CV, where the air-cooled lightweight aluminium flat twin engine was mounted ahead of the front wheels, but used Hooke type universal joint driveshaft joints, and 1955 Citroën DS, featuring the mid-engine layout. Panhard of France, DKW of Germany and Saab of Sweden offered exclusively front-wheel-drive cars, starting with the 1948 Saab 92.

In 1946, English car company Lloyd cars produced the Lloyd 650, a front-wheel-drive roadster. The two-stroke, two-cylinder motor was mounted transversely in the front and connected to the front wheels through a four-speed synchronised gearbox. The high price and lacklustre performance doomed its production. Only 600 units were produced from 1946 to 1950.

In 1946 in Italy, Antonio Fessia created his Cemsa Caproni F11, with 7 examples produced. His innovation was to create the happy combination of a low centre of gravity boxer engine (flat four) with a special frame. Due to post-war financial problems Cemsa could not continue production, but the project was resumed when taken on by Lancia in the 50s. In 1954, Alfa-Romeo had experimented with its first front-wheel-drive compact car named "33" (not related to the sports car similarly named "33"). It had the same transverse-mounted, forward-motor layout as modern front-wheel-drive automobiles. It even resembled the smaller version of its popular Alfa Romeo Giulia. However, due to the financial difficulties in post-war Italy, the 33 never saw production. Had Alfa-Romeo succeed in producing 33, it would have preceded the Mini as the first "modern" European front-wheel-drive compact car.

The German car industry resumed from WW2 in 1949/1950. In East Germany (DDR), the pre-war DKW F8 and F9 reappeared as the IFA F8 and IFA F9 in 1949, followed by the AWZ P70 in 1955, the Wartburg 311 in 1956 and the Trabant in 1958, all with front-wheel drive. The P70 and Trabant had Duroplast bodies, and the Trabant had both a monocoque body and a transversely mounted engine, a modern design in some ways. In 1950 West German makers also reintroduced front-wheel-drive cars: DKW had lost its production facilities in Eisenach (now in DDR) and reestablished itself in Ingolstadt. A version of the pre-war F9 was introduced as the DKW F89. Borgward introduced 2 new makes with front-wheel drive, the Goliath and the Lloyd in 1950. Gutbrod also came with a car in 1950; the Superior, but withdrew the car in 1954 and concentrated on other products. This car is best remembered for its Bosch fuel-injection.

In 1955, one of the first Japanese manufacturers to utilize front-wheel drive with a transversely installed engine was the Suzuki Suzulight, which was a small "city" car, called a kei car in Japanese.

In 1955, the Polish producer FSO in Warsaw introduced the front-wheel-driven Syrena of its own design.

In 1959 Austin Mini was launched by the British Motor Corporation, designed by Alec Issigonis as a response to the first oil crisis, the 1956 Suez Crisis, and the boom in bubble cars that followed. It was the first production front-wheel-drive car with a watercooled inline four-cylinder engine mounted transversely. This allowed eighty percent of the floor plan for the use of passengers and luggage. The majority of modern cars use this configuration. Its progressive rate rubber sprung independent suspension, low centre of gravity, and wheel at each corner with radial tyres, gave a massive increase in grip and handling over all but the most expensive cars on the market. It initially used flexing rubber instead of needle rollers at the inboard universal joints of the driveshafts but later changed to needle rollers, and GKN designed constant-velocity joint at each outboard end of the drive shafts to allow for steering movement. The Mini revived the use of front-wheel drive which had been largely abandoned since the 1930s.

=== 1960–1975 ===
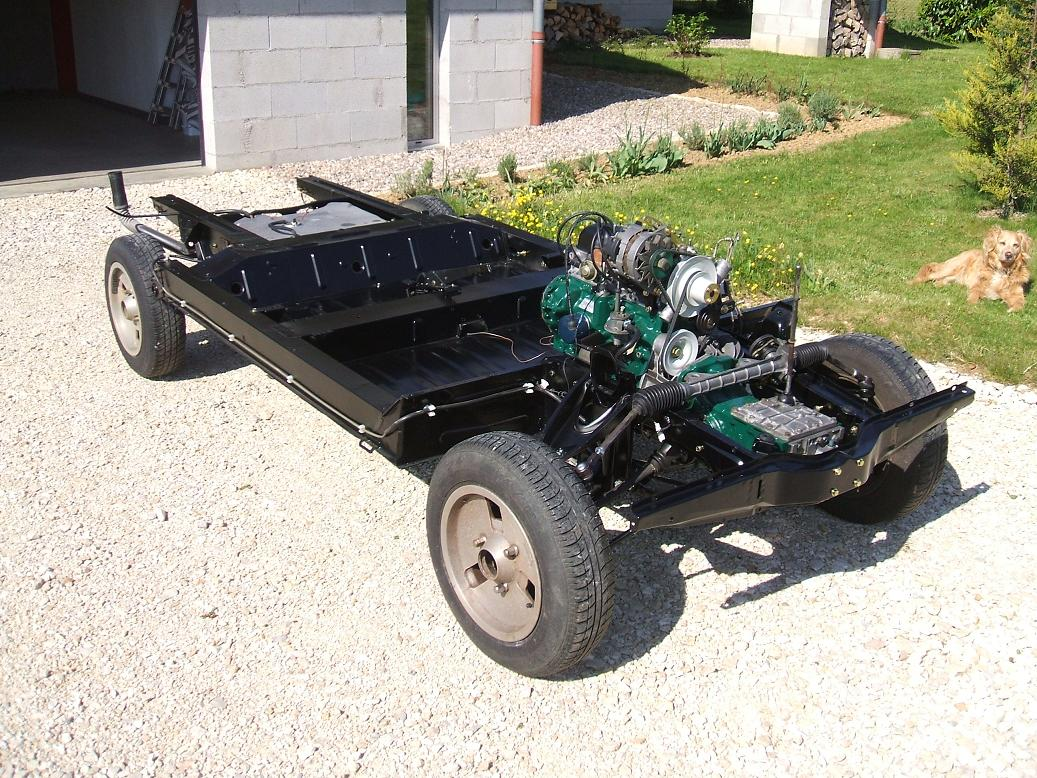
1960's Renault 4 rolling chassis with gearbox ahead of engine

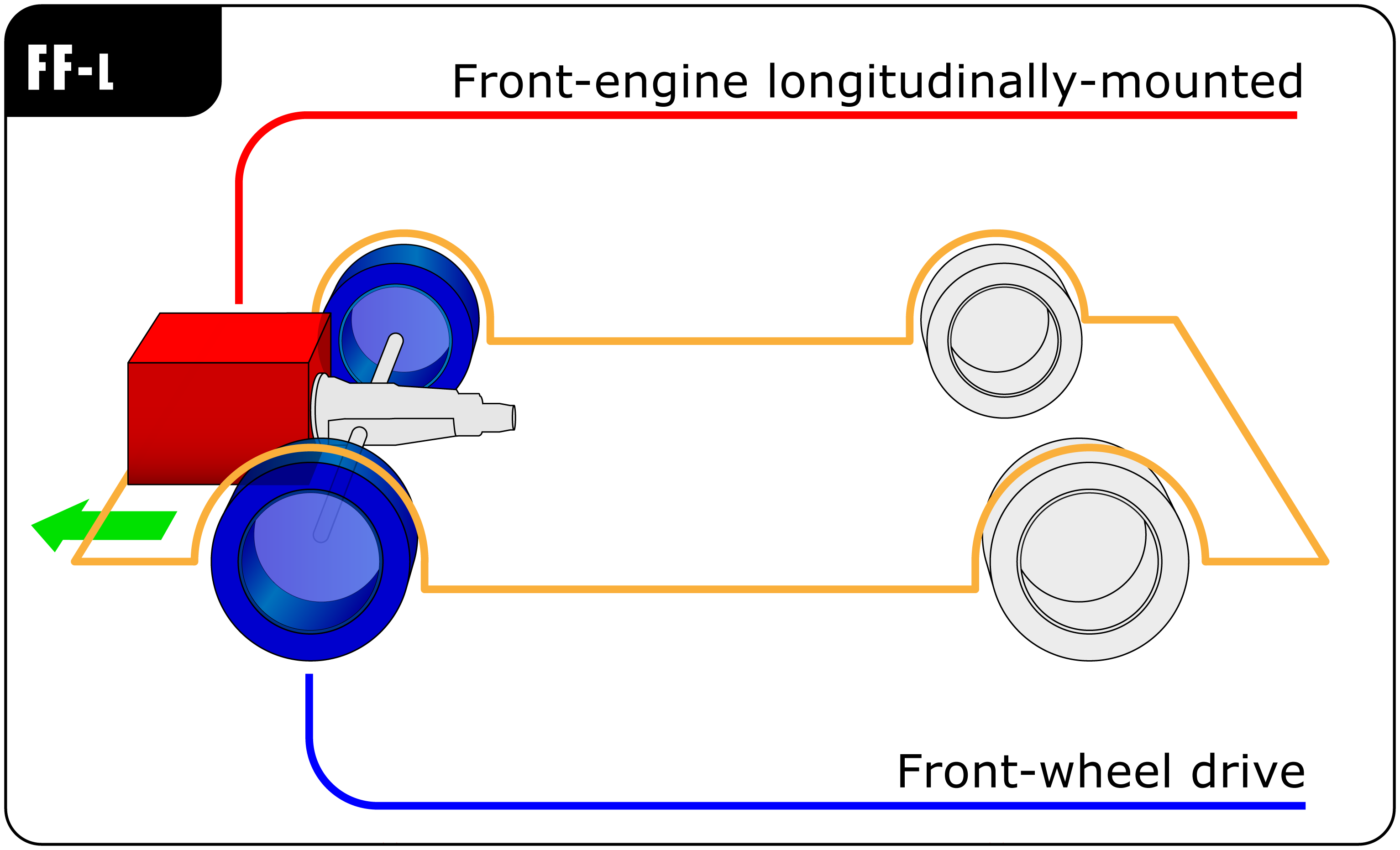
Front-wheel-drive FF layout as used by Audi and Subaru

The transversely mounted engine combined with front-wheel drive was popularized by the 1959 Mini; there the transmission was built into the sump of the engine, and drive was transferred to it via a set of primary gears. Another variant transmission concept was used by Simca in the 1960s keeping the engine and transmission in line, but transverse mounted and with unequal length driveshafts. This layout has proven itself to be the model on which almost all modern FWD vehicles are now based. Peugeot and Renault on their jointly developed small car engine of the 1970s where the 4-cylinder block was canted over to reduce the overall height of the engine with the transmission mounted on the side of the crankcase in what became popularly known as the "suitcase" arrangement (PSA X engine). The tendency of this layout to generate unwanted transmission "whine" has seen it fall out of favour. Also, clutch changes required engine removal. In Japan, the Prince Motor Company also developed a transmission-in-sump type layout for its first front wheel drive model, which after the company's takeover by Nissan, emerged as the Datsun 100A (Cherry) in 1971.

In 1960 Lancia could evolve the project CemsaF11 of Antonio Fessia with the innovative Lancia Flavia for first time with motor Boxer on auxiliary frame for low centre of gravity. This scheme continued in Lancia until 1984 with the end production of Lancia Gamma and successfully cloned until today by Subaru. Lancia, however also made front-wheel drive its flagship even in sport cars as the winner of the Rally, Lancia Fulvia, and then with large-scale models with excellent road qualities and performances including Lancia Beta, Lancia Delta, Lancia Thema including the powerful Lancia Thema 8.32 with engine Ferrari and all subsequent models. Ford introduced front-wheel drive to its European customers in 1962 with the Taunus P4. The 1965 Triumph 1300 was designed for a longitudinal engine with the transmission underneath. Audi has also used a longitudinally mounted engine overhung over the front wheels since the 1970s. Audi is one of the few manufacturers which still uses this particular configuration. It allows the use of equal-length half shafts and the easy addition of all-wheel drive, but has the disadvantage that it makes it difficult to achieve 50/50 weight distribution (although they remedy this in four-wheel-drive models by mounting the gearbox at the rear of the transaxle). The Subaru 1000 appeared in 1966 using front-wheel drive mated to a flat-4 engine, with the driveshafts of equal length extending from the transmission, which addressed some of the issues of the powertrain being somewhat complex and unbalanced in the engine compartment – the Alfa Romeo Alfasud (and its replacement, the 1983 Alfa 33 as well as the Alfa 145/146 up to the late 1990s) also used the same layout.

Honda also introduced several small front-wheel drive vehicles, with the N360 and N600, the Z360 and Z600 in 1967, the Honda 1300 in 1969, followed by the Honda Civic in 1972 and the Honda Accord in 1976.

Also in the 1970s and 1980s, the Douvrin engines used in the larger Renaults (20, 21, 25 and 30) used this longitudinal "forward" layout. The Saab Saab 99, launched in 1968, also used a longitudinal engine with a transmission underneath with helical gears. The 1966 Oldsmobile Toronado was the first U.S. front-wheel-drive car since the Cord 810. It used a longitudinal engine placement for its V8, coupled with an unusual "split" transmission, which turned the engine power 180 degrees. Power then went to a differential mounted to the transmission case, from which half-shafts took it to the wheels. The driveline was set fairly at centre-point of the wheels for better weight distribution, though this raised the engine, requiring lowered intake systems.

==== Giacosa innovation ====
Little known outside of Italy, the Primula is today primarily known for innovating the modern economy-car layout.
– Hemmings Motor News, August 2011

Front-wheel-drive layout had been highly impacted by the success of small, inexpensive cars, especially the British Mini. As engineered by Alec Issigonis, the compact arrangement located the transmission and engine sharing a single oil sump – despite disparate lubricating requirements – and had the engine's radiator mounted to the side of the engine, away from the flow of fresh air and drawing heated rather than cool air over the engine. The layout often required the engine be removed to service the clutch.

This Active Tourer MPV wants to be more stable than a BMW M3, and using the Dante Giacosa-pattern front-wheel-drive layout compacts the mechanicals and saves space for people in the reduced overall length of what will surely become a production 1-series tall-sedan crossover.
– Robert Cumberford, Automobile Magazine, March 2013

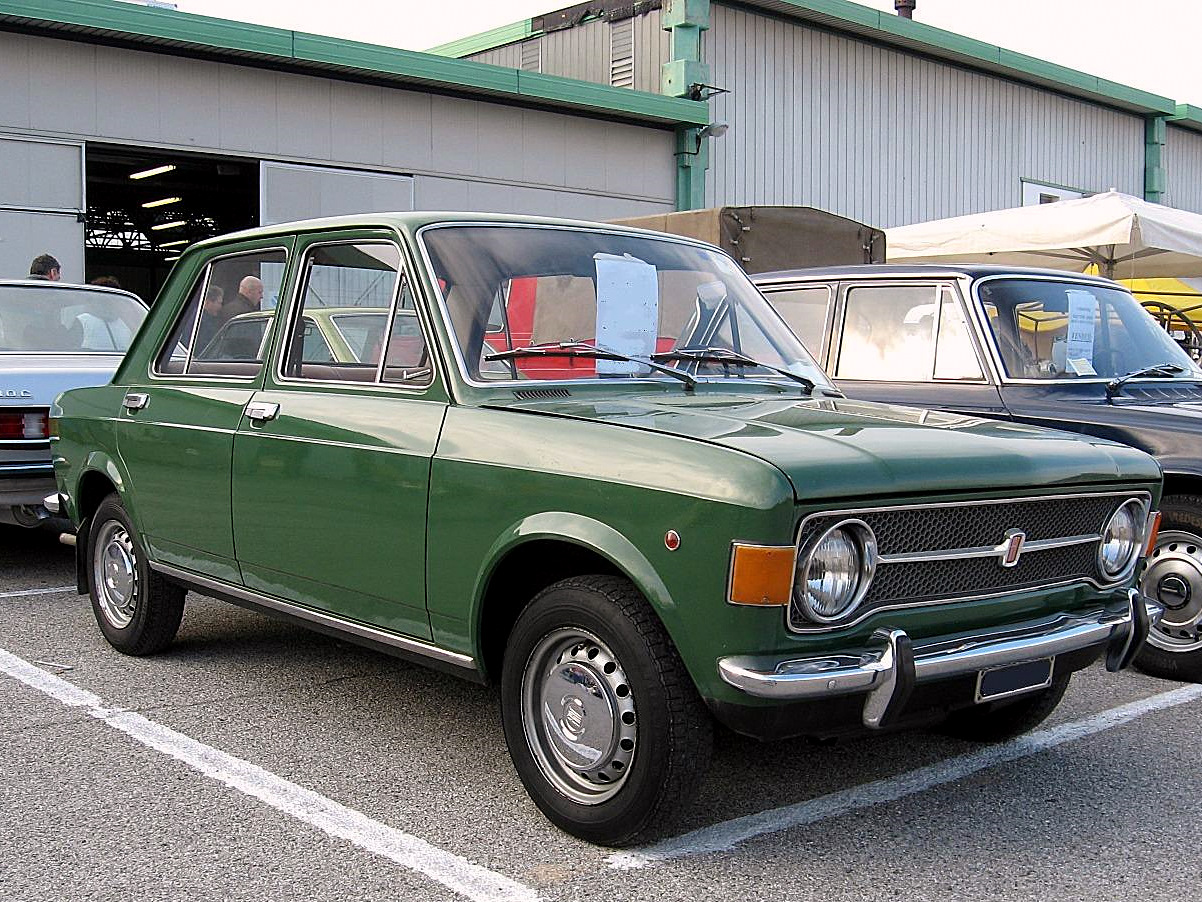
Dante Giacosa's designed Fiat 128

As engineered by Dante Giacosa, the Fiat 128 featured a transverse-mounted engine with unequal-length drive shafts and (thanks to Ettore Cordiano) an innovative clutch release mechanism – an arrangement which Fiat had strategically tested on a previous production model, the Primula, from its less market-critical subsidiary, Autobianchi.

Ready for production in 1964, the Primula featured a gear train offset from the differential and final drive with unequal length drive shafts. The layout enabled the engine and gearbox to be located side by side without sharing lubricating fluid while orienting the cooling fan toward fresh air flow. By using the Primula as a test-bed, Fiat was able to sufficiently resolve the layout's disadvantages, including uneven side-to-side power transmission, uneven tire wear and potential torque steer, the tendency for the power of the engine alone to steer the car under heavy acceleration. The problem was largely solved by making the shorter driveshaft solid, and the longer one hollow, to ensure both shafts experienced elastic twist which was roughly the same.

After the 128, Fiat further demonstrated the layout's flexibility, re-configurating the 128 drive train as a mid-engined layout for the Fiat X1/9. The compact, efficient Giacosa layout – a transversely-mounted engine with transmission mounted beside the engine driving the front wheels through an offset final drive and unequal-length driveshafts, combined with MacPherson struts and an independently located radiator – subsequently became common with competitors and arguably an industry standard.

=== 1975–1990 ===
The Corporate Average Fuel Economy standard drove a mass changeover of cars in the U.S. to front-wheel drive. The change began in 1978, with the introduction of the first American-built transverse-engined cars, the Plymouth Horizon and Dodge Omni (based on the European designed Simca Horizon), followed by the 1980 Chevrolet Citation and numerous other vehicles. Meanwhile, European car makers, that had moved to front-wheel drive decades before, began to homogenize their engine arrangement only in this decade, leaving Saab, Audi (and Volkswagen) as the only manufacturers offering a front-drive longitudinal engine layout. Years before this was the most common layout in Europe, with examples like Citroën DS, Renault 12, Renault 5, Renault 25 (a Chrysler LH ancestor) Alfa Romeo 33, Volkswagen Passat, etc. This transition can be exemplified in the Renault 21 that was offered with disparate engine configurations. The 1.7-litre version featured an "east–west" (transversely) mounted engine, but Renault had no gearbox suitable for a more powerful transverse engine: accordingly, faster versions featured longitudinally mounted (north–south) engines.

Despite these developments, however, by the end of the 1980s, almost all major European and Japanese manufacturers had converged around the Fiat-pioneered system of a transversely mounted engine with an "end-on" transmission with unequal length driveshafts. For example, Renault dropped the transmission-in-sump "Suitcase" engine that it had co-developed with Peugeot in the 1970s for its compact models, starting with the Renault 9 in 1982. Peugeot-Citroen themselves also moved over to the end-on gearbox solution when it phased out the Suitcase unit in favour of the TU-series engine in 1986. Nissan also abandoned the transmission-in-sump concept for its N12-series Cherry/Pulsar in 1982. Perhaps symbolically, British Leyland themselves, heirs to the British Motor Corporation – moved over to the industry-standard solution for the Austin Maestro in 1983, and all its subsequent front-wheel-drive models.

By reducing drivetrain weight and space needs, vehicles could be made smaller and more efficient without sacrificing acceleration. Integrating the powertrain with a transverse as opposed to a longitudinal layout, along with unibody construction and the use of constant velocity jointed drive axles, along with front wheel drive has evolved into the modern-day mass-market automobile. The introduction of the modern Volkswagen Golf in 1974, from a traditional U.S. competitor, and the introduction of the 1973 Honda Civic, and the 1976 Honda Accord served as a wake-up call for the "Big Three" (only Chrysler already produced front-wheel-drive vehicles in their operations outside North America). GM was even later with the 1979 Vauxhall Astra/Opel Kadett. Captive imports were the US car makers initial response to the increased demand for economy cars. The popularity of front-wheel drive began to gain momentum, with the 1981 Ford Escort, the 1982 Nissan Sentra, and the 1983 Toyota Corolla. Front-wheel drive became the norm for mid-sized cars starting with the 1982 Chevrolet Celebrity, 1982 Toyota Camry, 1983 Dodge 600, 1985 Nissan Maxima, 1986 Honda Legend, and the 1986 Ford Taurus. By the mid-1980s, most formerly rear-wheel-drive Japanese models were front-wheel drive, and by the mid-1990s, most American brands only sold a handful of rear-wheel-drive models.

=== 1990–present ===
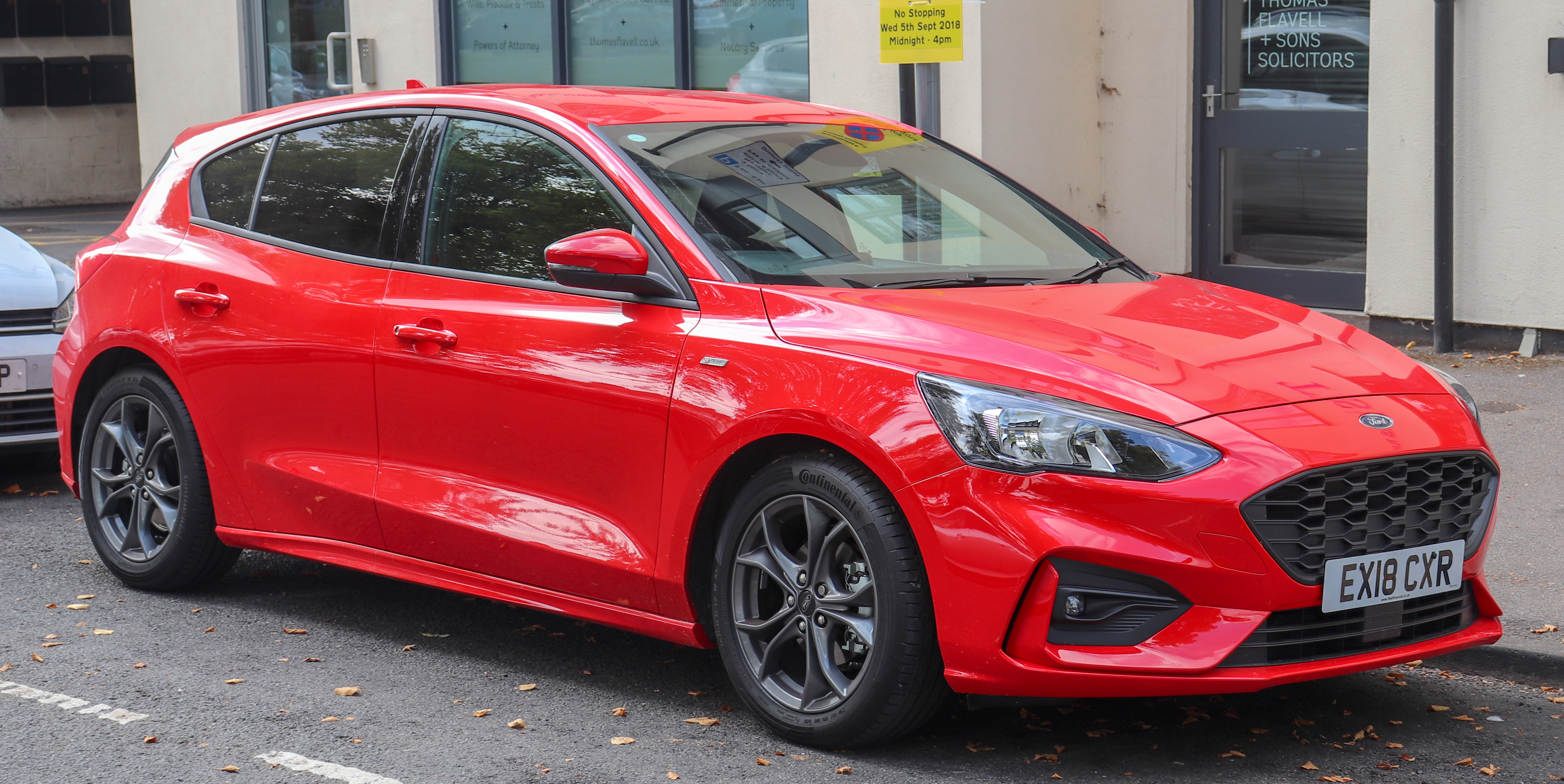
The Ford Focus MK4, a popular example of a front-wheel-drive vehicle

The vast majority of front-wheel-drive vehicles today use a transversely mounted engine with "end-on" mounted transmission, driving the front wheels via driveshafts linked via constant velocity (CV) joints, and a flexibly located electronically controlled cooling fan. This configuration was pioneered by Dante Giacosa in the 1964 Autobianchi Primula and popularized with the Fiat 128. Fiat promoted in its advertising that mechanical features consumed only 20% of the vehicle's volume and that Enzo Ferrari drove a 128 as his personal vehicle. The 1959 Mini used a substantially different arrangement with the transmission in the sump, and the cooling fan drawing hot air from its side-facing location.

Volvo Cars has switched its entire lineup after the 900 series to front-wheel drive. Swedish engineers at the company have said that transversely mounted engines allow for more crumple zone area in a head-on collision. American auto manufacturers are now shifting larger models (such as the Chrysler 300 and most of the Cadillac lineup) back to rear-wheel drive. There were relatively few rear-wheel-drive cars marketed in North America by the early 1990s; Chrysler's car line-up was entirely front-wheel drive by 1990. GM followed suit in 1996 where its B-body line was phased out, where its sports cars (Camaro, Firebird, Corvette) were the only RWDs marketed; by the early 2000s, the Chevrolet Corvette and Cadillac Catera were the only RWD cars offered by General Motors until the introduction of the Sigma platform. After the phaseout of the Ford Panther platform (except for the Mustang), Ford automobiles (including the Transit Connect van) manufactured for the 2012 model year to present are front-wheel drive; its D3 platform (based on a Volvo platform) has optional all-wheel drive.

== Records ==
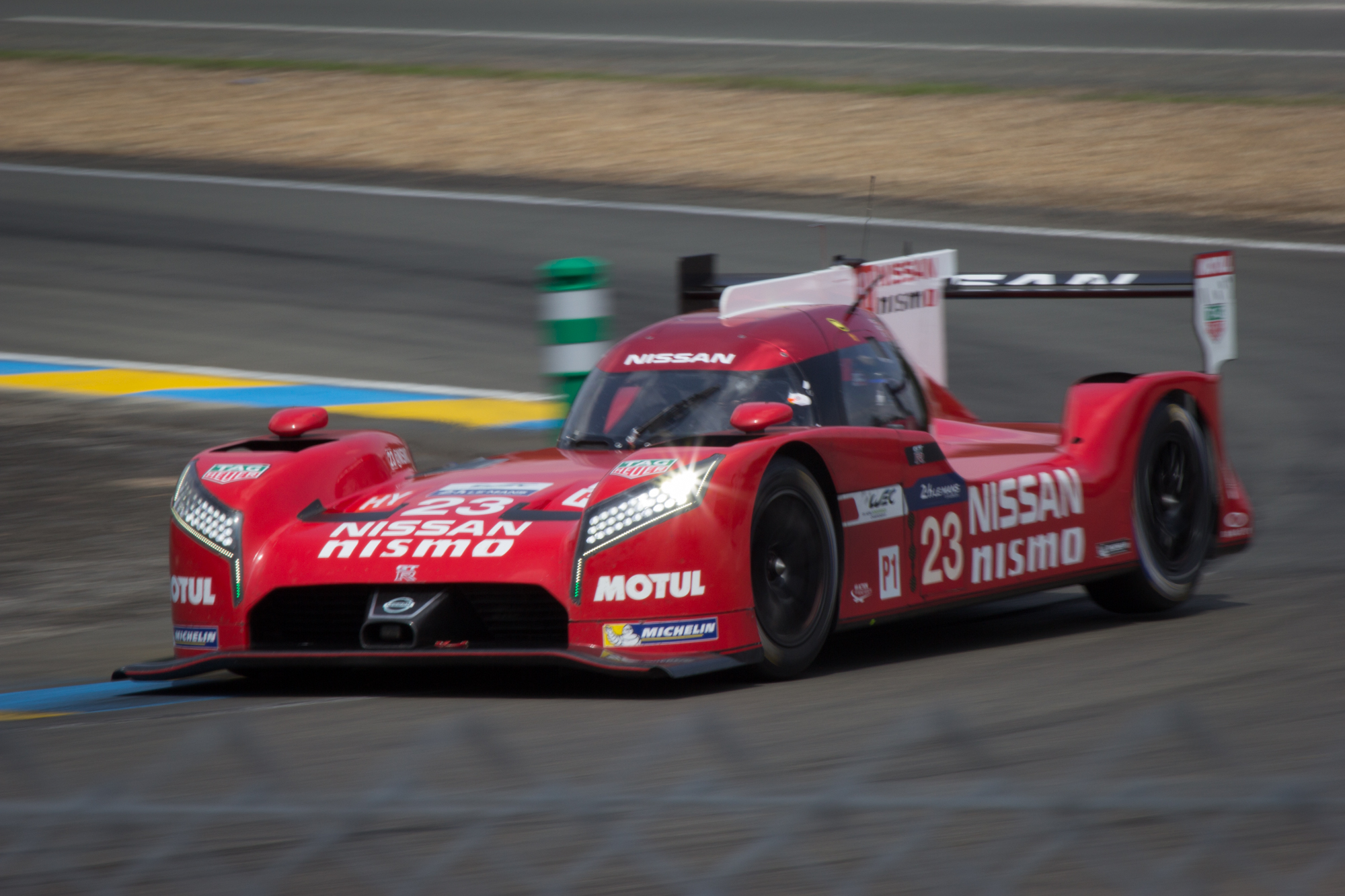
Nissan GT-R LM Nismo

- The Nissan GT-R LM Nismo race car holds the record for being the most-powerful front-wheel-drive car, with its combustion engine outputs approximately 500 hp (370 kW; 510 PS) while the flywheel system is intended to have an additional output of approximately 750 hp (560 kW; 760 PS). This accounts for a total of 1,250 hp (930 kW; 1,270 PS). Power from the flywheel was intended to be split between the front and rear wheels, making the car all-wheel drive in this configuration. However, due to unreliability the car was raced without the flywheel and with 500 hp driving the front wheels only.
  - However, the 1970 Oldsmobile Toronado remains the most-powerful street-legal front-wheel-drive production car, with W-34 option producing 400 hp (298 kW).
- A production Dodge Neon SRT-4 from RaceDeck Racing broke the land speed record for its class at Bonneville Salt Flats in Utah on 16 August 2006. Driven by Jorgen Moller Jr., the record was set at 221 mph (356 km/h) average speed for both runs on the five-mile (8 km) course.
- On 3 April 2017, the 5th generation Honda Civic Type R achieved a lap time of 7:43.80 on the Nürburgring Nordschleife, almost 7 seconds faster than its predecessor, setting a new record for front-wheel-drive cars. The car also set new front-wheel drive lap records at the Magny-Cours, Spa-Francorchamps, Silverstone, Estoril, Hungaroring and Mount Panorama circuits. The Nürburgring record was broken by the Renault Mégane RS Trophy-R in July 2019 which set a time of 7:40.10, but in 2020 the Limited Edition Civic Type R broke the Mégane's front-wheel drive lap record at the Suzuka Circuit by one and a half seconds.

== See also ==
- Automobile layout
- Four-wheel drive
- Individual-wheel drive
- Front-engine, front-wheel drive layout
- Front-mid-engine, front-wheel-drive layout
- Rear-wheel drive
