= Vincent lifeboat engine =

The Vincent lifeboat engine was a unique design of two-stroke petrol engine. It was developed during World War II as a highly efficient engine for airborne lifeboats, providing a long range from little fuel.

== Requirements ==
The airborne lifeboat was developed for the RAF to provide a means of rescue for downed aircrew. A search and rescue aircraft would drop the lifeboat by parachute to the crew, who could then attempt to make their own way back to a friendly shore. Although aircraft carried their own inflatable liferafts, these merely protected the crew from drowning and were not navigable vessels. Crew taking to their liferafts near a hostile shore would often be captured, if they were not first rescued by air-sea rescue launches.

Several designs of airborne lifeboat were developed, using both sails and pairs of small Britannia outboard motors, mounted inboard as Z drives. These were adequate for crews crossing the North Sea from operations in Europe, but a longer-ranged design would be required for the expected air war against Japan. An engine was required that could give a range of 1,000 miles at 5-6 knots on only 50 gallons of petrol. This petrol would also have to be anything from a range between low-grade 70 octane pool petrol and 120 octane aviation spirit. The best range achieved by the previous Austin marine engine on the same quantity of fuel had been 500 miles at 4 knots. Further requirements were that the engine would be waterproof against submersion of all but its air intake, its ignition system would be radio screened and that it would be reliable enough to not require maintenance during a voyage. As the lifeboat was dropped by parachute, it had to survive a 5 G deceleration as it hit the water.

== Design ==
The design was developed by Phil Irving, engine designer of Vincent Motorcycles, over two years from 1942. It was based on patents already held by Phil Vincent, for an opposed piston engine.

The engine had three horizontal cylinders, the outer two of which were power cylinders and the centre cylinder used as a scavenging pump. Each power cylinder contained two slightly oversquare opposed pistons with uniflow piston-porting. Unusually for a small two-stroke, there was no reliance on the Kadenacy effect, although the transfer ports were angle-drilled to encourage swirl.

The scavenging pistons were even more unusual, being double-acting. Two highly oversquare double-acting pistons in a single cylinder gave two pump volumes: one between the pistons that supplied #1 power cylinder, the other formed by the two spaces outside the pistons being coupled to both supply #2 cylinder. These double-acting pistons were of crosshead form, with a ½" diameter piston rod emerging through a seal to a crosshead formed on the end of the piston rod, where it carried the connecting rod.

The pistons were driven by two separate three-throw crankshafts, coupled by a chain drive. The exhaust crankshaft led the transfer crankshaft by 24°. (Note: Although the two crankshafts rotated at the same speed, the crankshaft for the pistons that control the transfer ports led the exhaust crankshaft by 24°. This is a typical feature of opposed-piston engines, as the longer opening of the exhaust port improves scavenging. The Napier Deltic's geometry imposed a convenient lead of 20°.) The same chain also drive a reduction sprocket to give a propeller shaft reduction of 2.04:1. Propeller output also passed through a reversing gearbox with two multi-plate oil clutches to select direction.

The main body of the engine was a single aluminium casting, with grey cast iron dry liners to the cylinders. The crankshafts were also of cast iron.

Ancillaries were at the ends of the engine. A spring starter was at the front of the engine, together with a diaphragm fuel pump and a three-chamber gear pump. This pumped engine lubricating oil, seawater coolant and also provided a bilge pump for the lifeboat. The engine was stored dry, to save weight, and any slight overheating as the cooling circuit filled encouraged rapid warm-up, allowing full engine power from the outset. At the rear of the engine, outboard of the crankshaft coupling chain, a rectangular enclosure kept the electrical accessories dry. These comprised an electric starter, a dynamo generator and the BTH ignition magneto. The carburettor was an Amal.

Dimensions

Power pistons	56 mm (bore) × 50.8 mm (stroke)
Capacity	497 cc
Compression ratio	7.0:1
Pump pistons	63.5 mm × 38 mm
Port timing	Relative to transfer crank, leads exhaust crankshaft by 24°
Transfer opens	39° bbdc
closes	39° abdc
Exhaust opens	72° bbdc
closes	25° abdc
Weight	264 lb

Performance

Performance of the propeller was limited by cavitation to 15 bhp, so the engine was tuned for maximum economy at just below this power. Fuel consumption was 0.71 pints/bhp/hour at 11 bhp, rising slightly at 14 bhp. This gave the desired range of 1,020 miles at 5.3 knots on 50 gallons of fuel.

== Service ==
Although performing well in its tests, the engine did not enter service. This was due to the unexpectedly rapid end to the war in the Far East, and the lack of urgency that created within the Air Ministry. Although the basic engine was ready on time, much development after this was spent on ancillaries such as electric starting and a reverse gear. The production engines did not appear until 1949.

== Survivors ==
The engine was rare in its period, only fifty being built. Survivors today are few, although a relatively large proportion of around a dozen are claimed to survive.

== Developments ==
Post-war, the lifeboat engine was doubled up into a flat-six (four power cylinders, two pumping) twelve-piston engine for a 10 kVA generator. This engine was unsuccessful owing to problems with the complex crankcase casting warping after machining, preventing a reliable seal.

== Other developments ==
In 1956, Vincent produced the Amanda water scooter, the first personal water craft. Although there has frequently been confusion over the "Vincent marine engine", the engine used here was unrelated, a 150 cc air-cooled single-cylinder engine that was also used in the Vincent lawnmower. Owing to quality problems with the fibreglass hull of the craft, rather than any engine problems, these were not a success and the idea was forgotten for over a decade.

== See also ==
- Lloyd 650, another two-stroke engine of comparable vintage, with two power cylinders sharing a single double-acting pumping cylinder.
