= Lloyd Cars Ltd =

- Industry: Automotive
- Founded: 1936
- Defunct: 1951
- Fate: Defunct
- Headquarters: Grimsby, Lincolnshire, England
- Key people: Roland Lloyd
- Products: Automobiles

Lloyd Cars Ltd was a British motor manufacturer, founded by Roland Lloyd (1904–1965), son of a garage owner, and based in Patrick Street, Grimsby, Lincolnshire, England between 1936 and 1951. Two models were made, separated by World War II; the company was unusual for a small manufacturer in making nearly all components in-house. After car production ceased the company continued in general engineering until 1983. During World War II the company made components for Rolls-Royce Merlin aircraft engines.

About 15 Lloyd cars are thought to survive.

The make had no connection with North German Automobile and Engine company which made cars under a different Lloyd brand between 1906 and 1914 and between 1950 and 1963.

== Lloyd 350 ==
Lloyd 350

Overview
- Manufacturer: Lloyd Cars Ltd
- Production: 1936–1939

Body and chassis
- Body style: 2-door tourer 3-seat saloon van

Powertrain
- Engine: 347 cc Villiers 2-stroke
- Transmission: 3-speed-and-reverse

Dimensions
- Wheelbase: 69 in (1,753 mm)
- Length: 111 in (2,819 mm)

Chronology
- Successor: Lloyd 650

The pre-war car was really a cyclecar and was powered by a single-cylinder, water-cooled Villiers two-stroke engine of 347 cc producing 11.5 bhp, located at the back of the car and transmitting power via a three-speed gearbox to the nearside rear-wheel only with a chain. The four-wheel chassis featured all round independent suspension using transverse leaf springs. The car was deliberately simple, there was no electric starter, the fuel tank was mounted above the engine with gravity feed and the windscreen wipers were hand operated.

It was available as an open two-seater and, unusually for a light car, as a closed 3-seater. Production stopped on the outbreak of the Second World War, with a claimed 250 made, with cars exported to the Netherlands, New Zealand and South Africa. It was said to be capable of reaching 45 mph (70 km/h). The car was listed at £80 for the basic version but there was also a de-luxe with electric starting and lighting at £85.

Just before the outbreak of war a van version was introduced with the engine at the front and front-wheel drive, but only a few were made.

== Lloyd 650 ==
Lloyd 650

Overview
- Manufacturer: Lloyd Cars Ltd
- Production: 1946–1950

Body and chassis
- Body style: 2-door 2/4-seat roadster

Powertrain
- Engine: 654 cc Lloyd 2-stroke
- Transmission: 4-speed manual

Dimensions
- Wheelbase: 93 in (2,362 mm)
- Length: 147 in (3,734 mm)
- Width: 51 in (1,295 mm)
- Curb weight: 1,400 lb (635 kg)

Chronology
- Predecessor: Lloyd 350
- Successor: none

In 1946, the production restarted with a larger two-cylinder 654 cc Lloyd-made engine with a bore of 70 mm and stroke of 85 mm producing 25 bhp at 2450 rpm. The twin-cylinder alloy unit was mounted transversely at the front and drove the front wheels through a four-speed gearbox with synchromesh on all speeds including reverse. It was still a two-stroke but the bearings were pressure lubricated. A third cylinder and piston which had a reciprocating and slightly rotating motion was connected to the carburettor with ports in the cylinder walls connecting to the engine's two cylinders. This was used to draw the fuel mixture from the carburettor and transfer the mixture to each engine cylinder. This double-acting fuel charging cylinder piston was hollow with ports located in the piston walls and ports located in the charging cylinder walls connecting to each of the engine's main cylinders. One engine cylinder was charged by the charging cylinder piston's down and slightly rotating stroke which allowed the piston and charging cylinder side wall port to uncover and allow the mixture transfer to the engine cylinder. The other engine cylinder was charged with mixture by the upwards stroke of the charging cylinder piston. The engine cylinders and the fuel charging cylinders were set in a triangular configuration with the fuel charging cylinder being located centrally and receiving gravity fed fuel from the bulkhead mounted fuel tank. This method of mixture input to the engine cylinders allowed for the engine wet oil sump.

The chassis again had all independent suspension but now by coil springs fitted in oil tight cylinders with the oil acting as damper. The springs were horizontal at the front and vertical at the rear. The body was fabricated from aluminium. The braking system used a Bowden type cable operated system. Steering was by rack and pinion. The gear change lever was mounted horizontally just below the steering wheel.

The car was much more streamlined than the pre-war body but with an overall length of 12 feet 3 inches and two or four-seater open bodywork the car was really too big for its engine and performance was poor with a top speed of only 55 mph (85 km/h). The car was also very expensive at £480 in 1948 when family sized cars could be bought for £300. Roughly 600 cars were produced and some were exported to Australia, Belgium, Denmark, India and the United States.

== See also ==
- List of British car manufacturers
- Vincent lifeboat engine – another two-stroke engine of comparable vintage, with two power cylinders sharing a single double-acting pumping cylinder.
