= Fiat Moretti Sportiva =

Coupé produced by the Moretti Motor Company

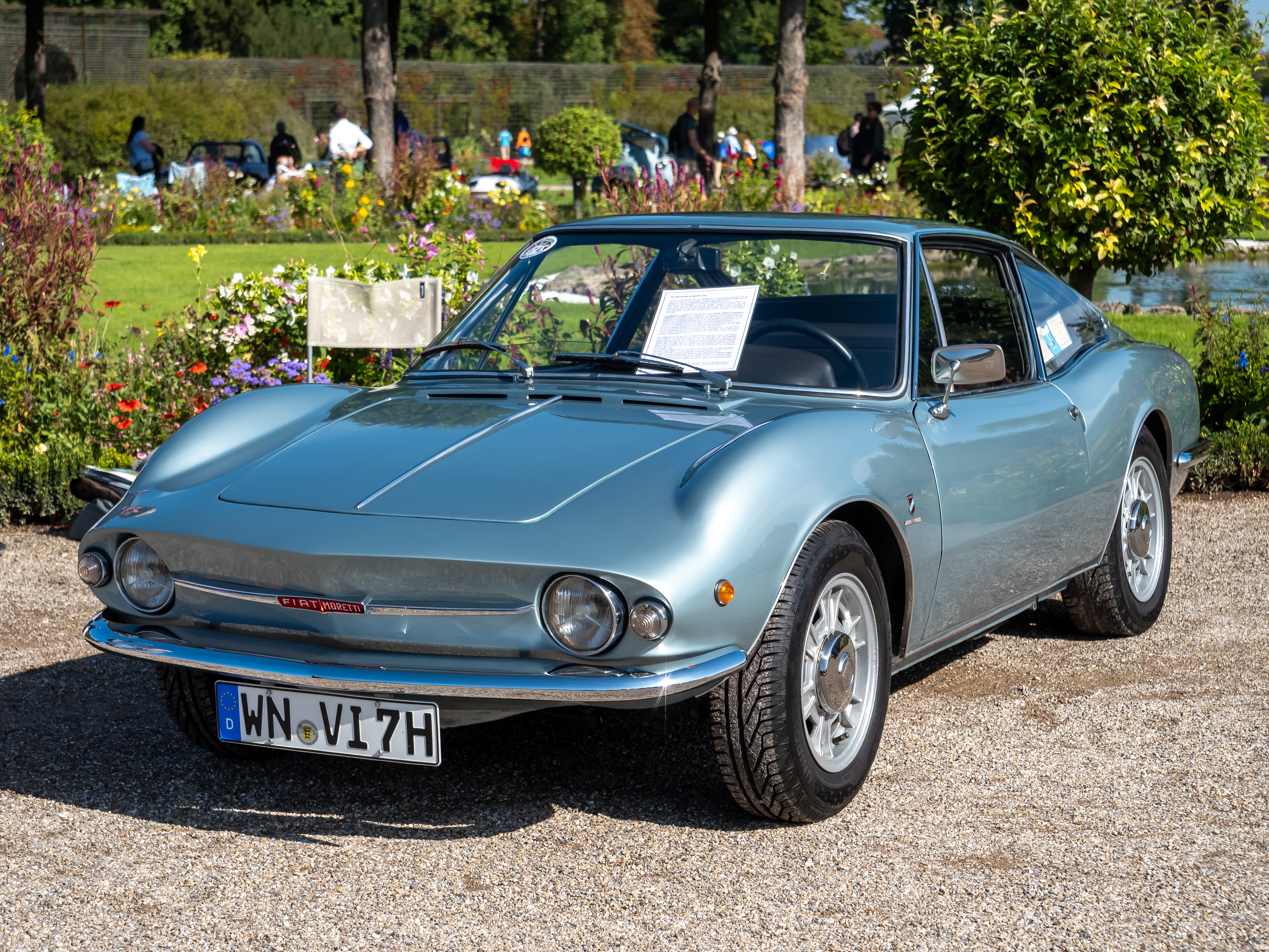
- 1967 Fiat Moretti Sportiva SS Series I

Overview
- Manufacturer: Moretti Motor Company
- Also called: Moretti Sportiva; Fiat 850 Moretti Sportiva; Moretti Berlinetta S4
- Production: 1965–1971
- Designer: Dany Brawand

Body and chassis
- Body style: 2-door coupe
- Layout: Rear-engine, rear-wheel-drive layout
- Related: Fiat 850 Coupe

Powertrain
- Engine: 843 cc Tipo 100 OHV I4; 982 cc Tipo 100 OHV I4

Dimensions
- Wheelbase: 2,027 mm (79.8 in)
- Length: S2: 3,780 mm (148.8 in); S4: 3,970 mm (156.3 in)
- Width: 1,450 mm (57.1 in); S4: 1,510 mm (59.4 in)
- Height: Coupé: 1,160 mm (45.7 in); Trasformabile: 1,200 mm (47.2 in); S4: 1,330 mm (52.4 in)
- Curb weight: 660–700 kg (1,455–1,543 lb); S4: 740 kg (1,631 lb)

The Fiat Moretti Sportiva is a small coupé produced by the Moretti Motor Company from 1967 to 1971. It was based on the engine and chassis of the Fiat 850 Coupé. A taller, four-seat model using the same design theme was also developed; that model was called the Moretti S4 (or Special S4 or Berlinetta S4).

== History ==
Introduced in 1965 at the Turin Motor Show, the Sport was Moretti's last car that could be customised beyond choice of upholstery colours. There was the possibility to obtain trim and equipment levels according to the buyer's taste. It was designed by Swiss designer Dany Brawand, head of Moretti's styling centre, and was only offered a two-seater coupé with the option of a fabric roof on a version called the Trasformabile. The original Sport had dual headlights, although a dealer from Switzerland fitted two sports with quad headlights to resemble the not yet available Fiat Dino.

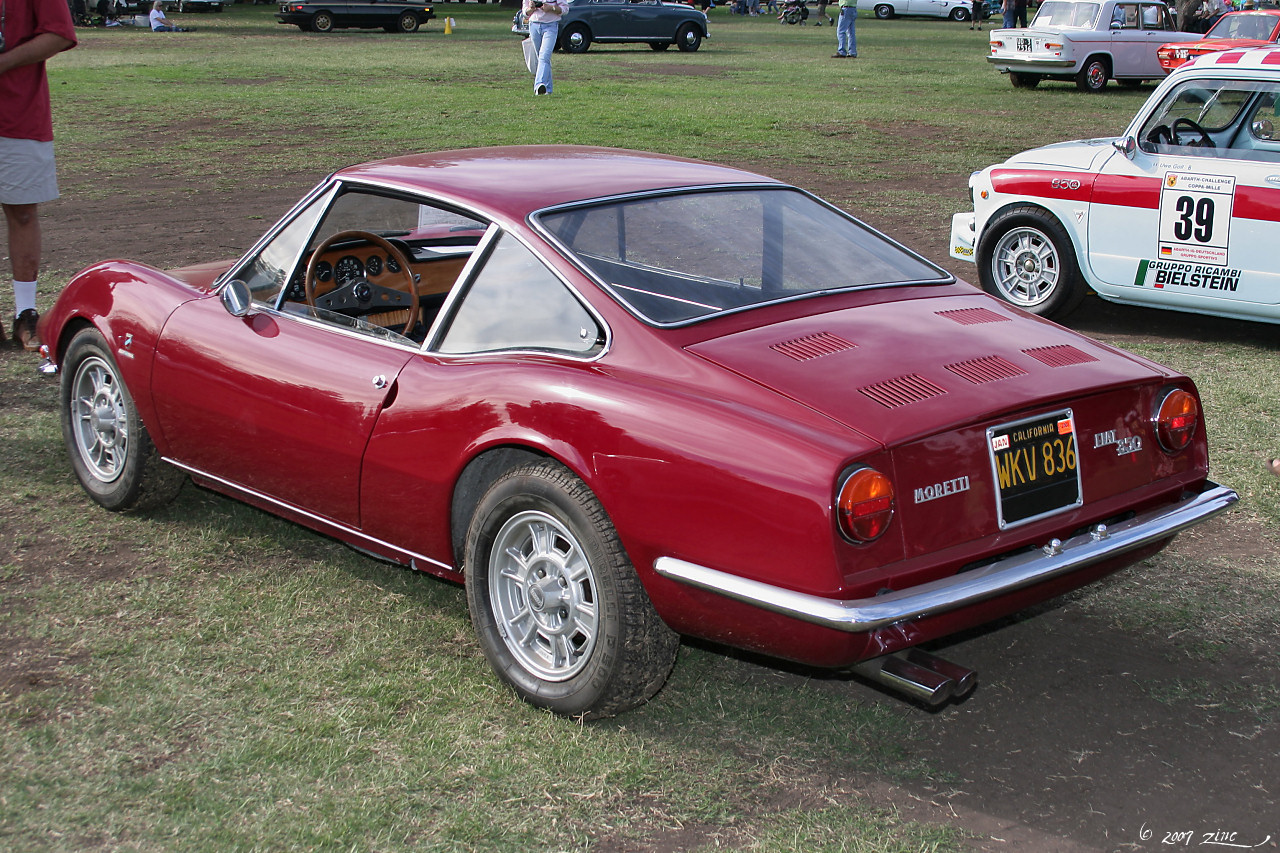
1967 Sportiva rear view

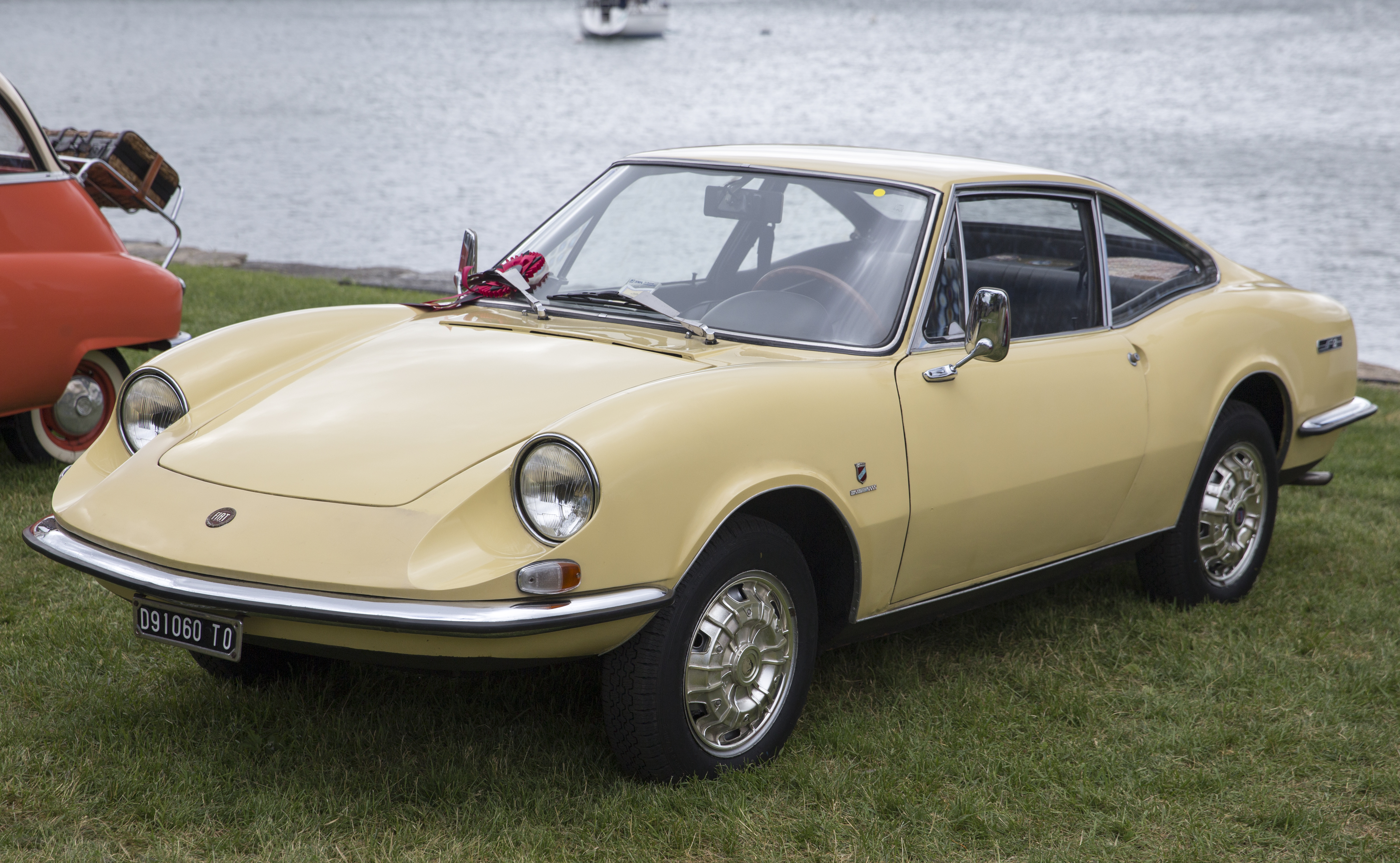
Sportiva S2; an updated variant

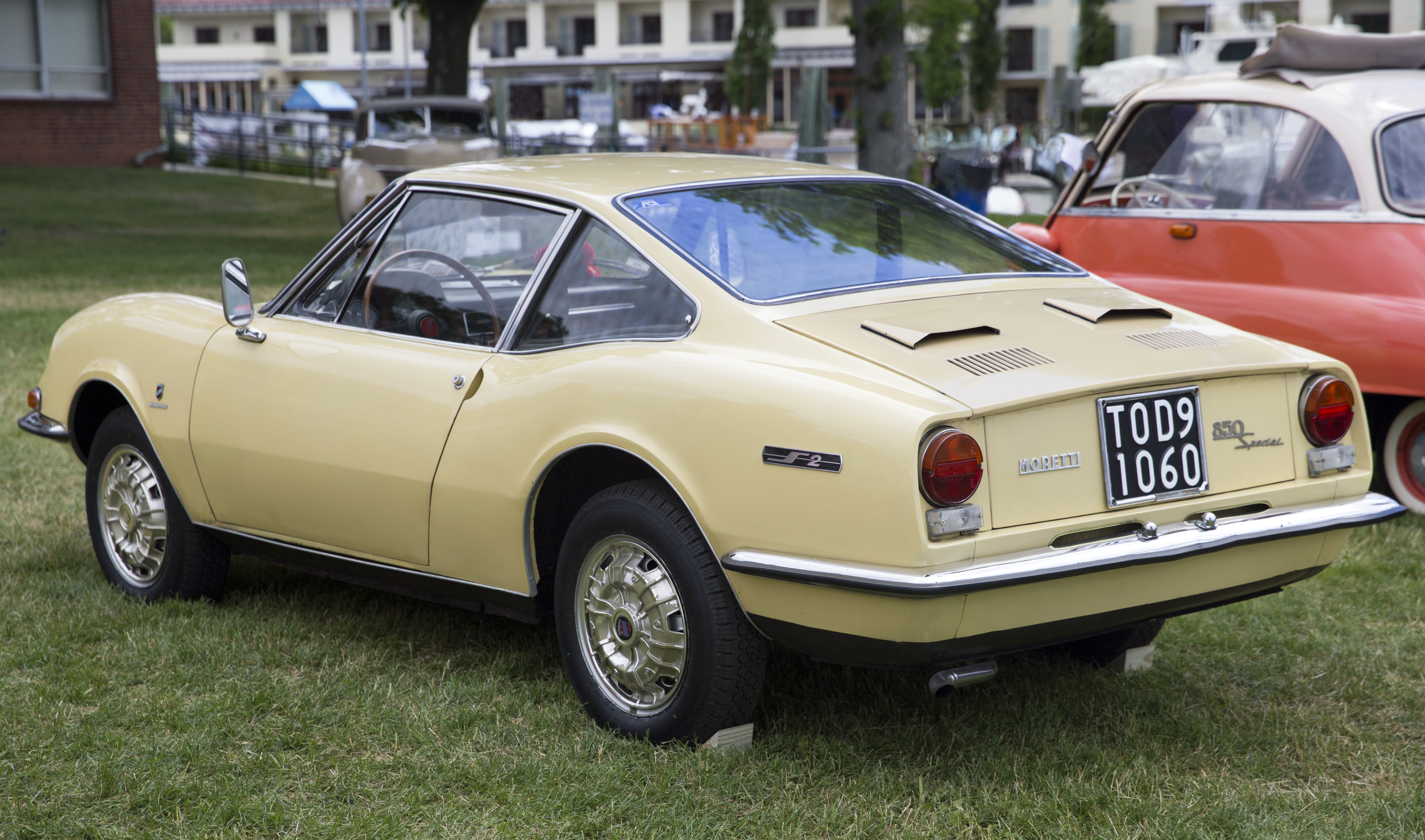
The rear of the S2 did not change (the vent covers and reversing lights were added by Moretti to this example later)

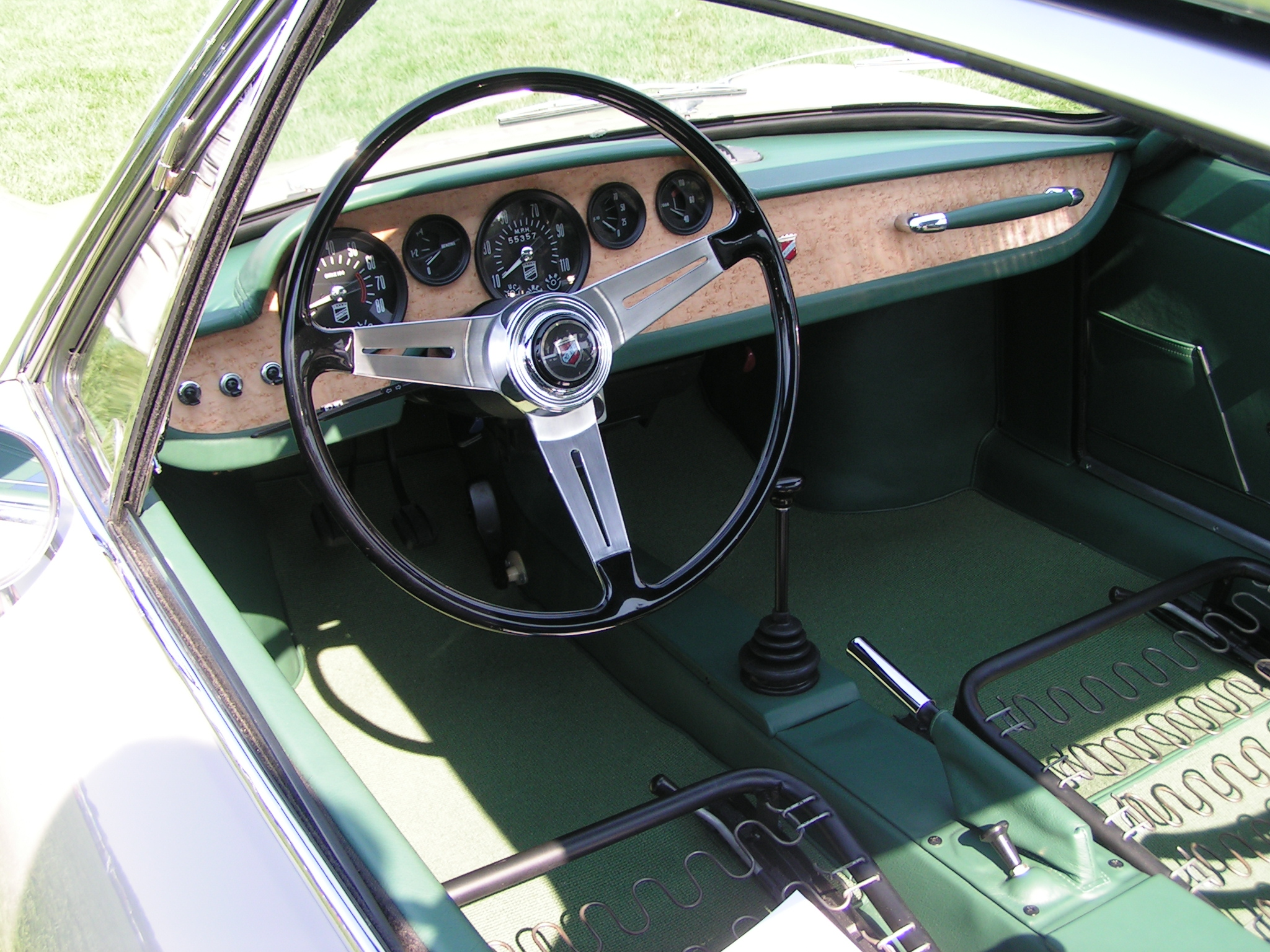
Sportiva interior. This example is missing the upholstery on the seats.

== Specifications ==
The Sportiva was originally offered with an 850 cc engine producing around 47 PS (35 kW) at 6,000 rpm. Later, an optional 982 cc unit producing 62 PS (46 kW) at 6,200 rpm was also made available; this variant was called the 1000 Sport. Top speeds are 145 km/h (90 mph) for the 850 and 165 km/h (103 mph) for the more powerful 1000.

Due to the aerodynamic profile, it was necessary to mount the spare wheel horizontally in the front luggage area, occupying it entirely. Therefore, the designers had to create a luggage compartment, made from a stiff cloth, between the seats and the engine space. The lack of rear seats was unappreciated by purchasers and in the successive year, Moretti introduced the S4 four-seater. Introduced in 1969, the S4 was, by necessity, much taller and somewhat less elegant than the Sportiva. The S4 was also available with the larger engine, but it is unknown whether any were built.

== Production ==
Approximately 300 examples of the Sport were produced in various forms (around 52 examples of the Moretti Sportiva S2). The base price for the Moretti Sport in 1967 was 1,095,000 Liras, which could increase with personalisation to nearly two million Lira. In comparison, the more luxurious and modern Fiat 124 in the same year had a list price of 1,035,000 Liras.
