= Moretti S.p.A. =

Former Italian automobile manufacturer

Moretti Motor Company
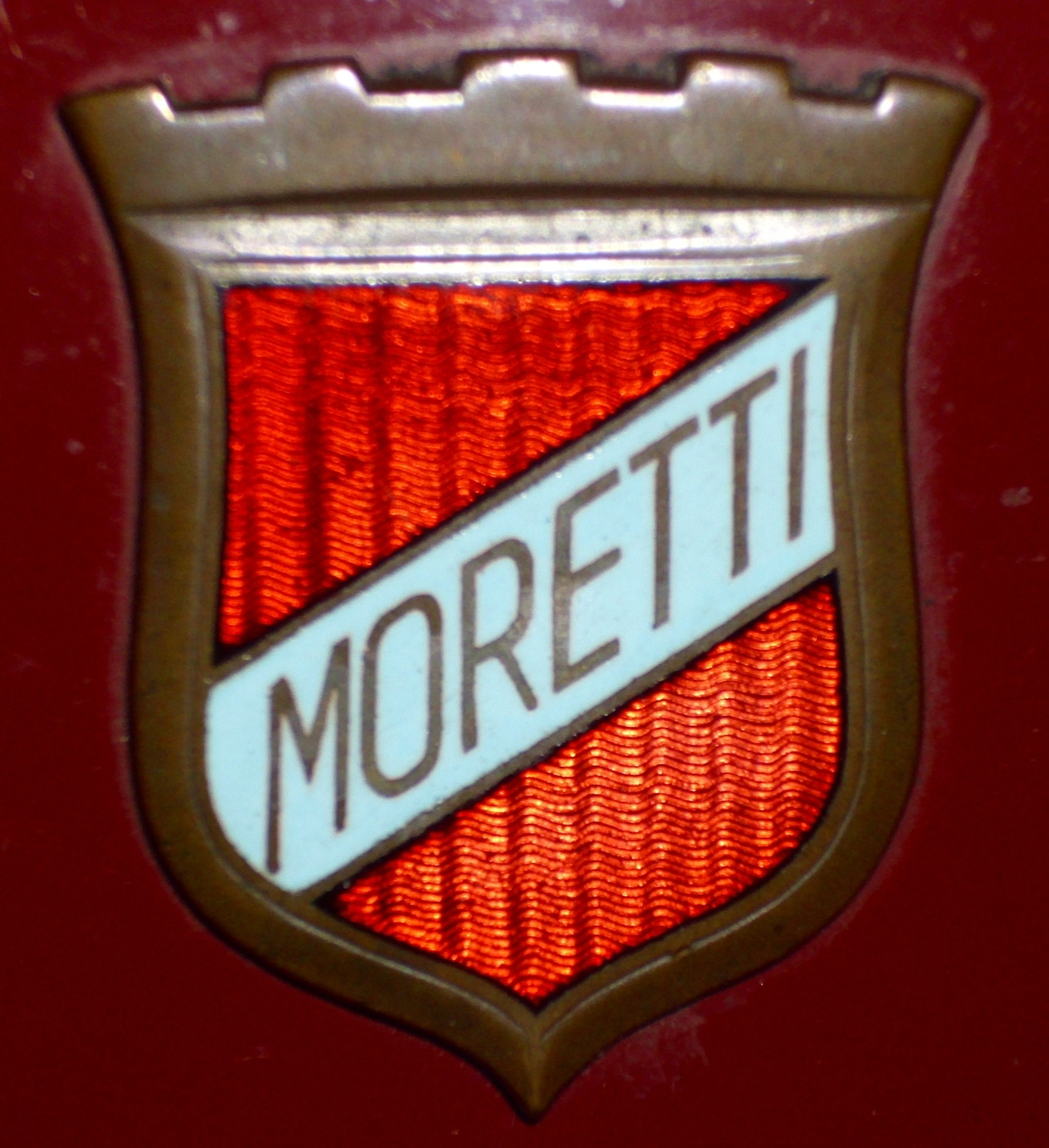
- Industry: Automotive
- Founded: 1925
- Headquarters: Turin, Italy
- Key people: Giovanni Moretti, founder
- Products: Automobiles

Moretti S.p.A. is a former Italian automobile manufacturer. It was founded in 1925 and ceased automobile production in December 1989. Today, many of its sports car models can still be found at various European auto shows. Moretti Motors produced a variety of models at various times including motorcycles, microcars, and several commercial vehicles.

== History ==
=== Own constructions ===
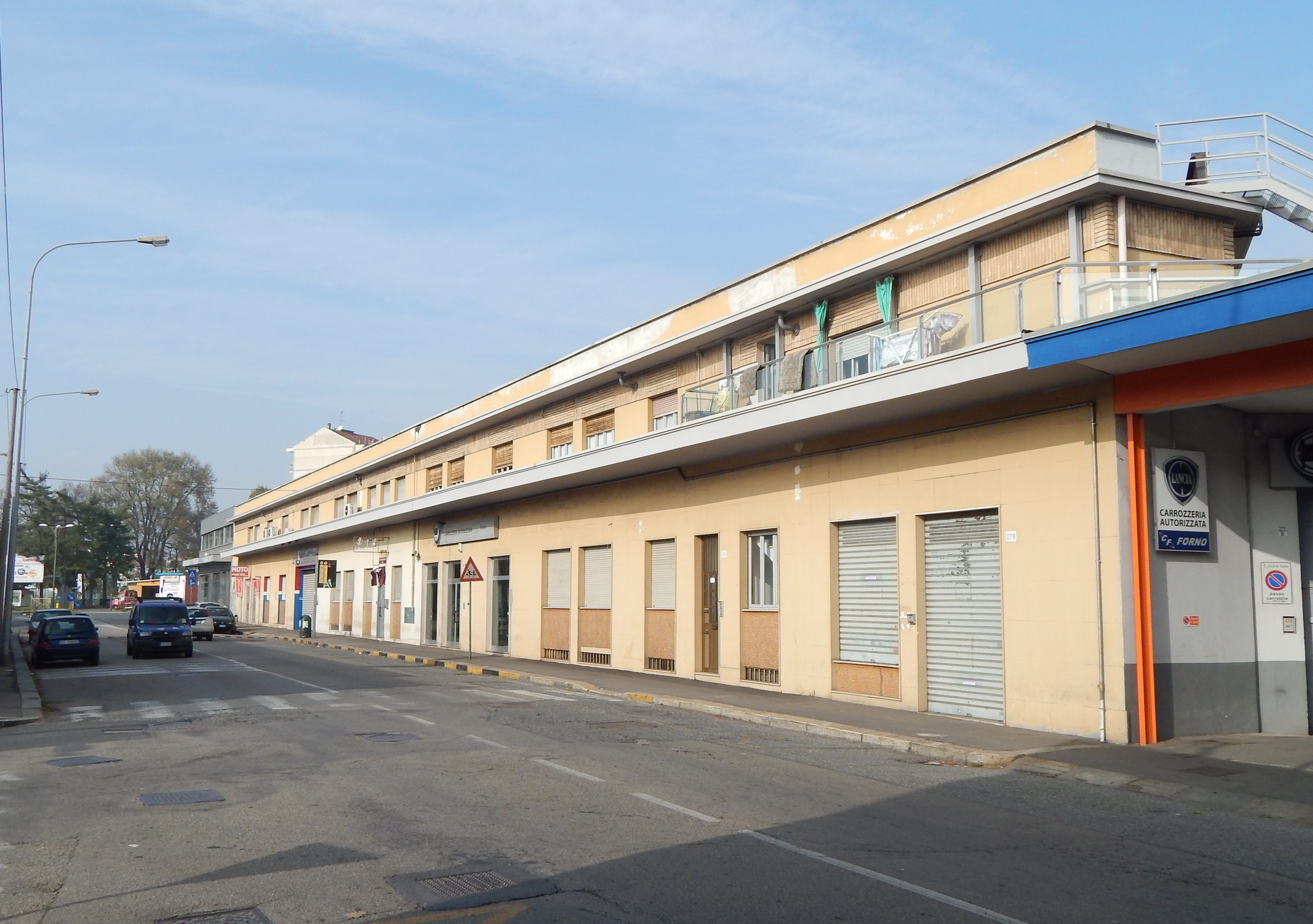
The old company premises in Torino

Moretti Motor Company was founded in 1925 by Giovanni Moretti in order to design and build motorcycles, both of his own design and with agreements with other companies. Using the same motorcycle engines, Giovanni Moretti also dabbled in microcars in the late 1920s and early 1930s. During World War II, Moretti found success constructing various commercial vehicles, most notably a range of electric powered small trucks and a 5- or 7-seat electric car. In 1946, with the war over and thus demand for their commercial vehicles wavering, Moretti began production of conventional cars.

The first conventional car model released by Moretti Motors was the 'Cita'. Shortly afterwards Moretti came out with the '600'. Then, in 1953, the '750' was released. Various versions of the '750' were built during the 1950s including estates, taxis, berlinas, coupes, single seat racing cars and commercial vehicles. Some competitive success was achieved in the 1950s with the 600 and 750 models.

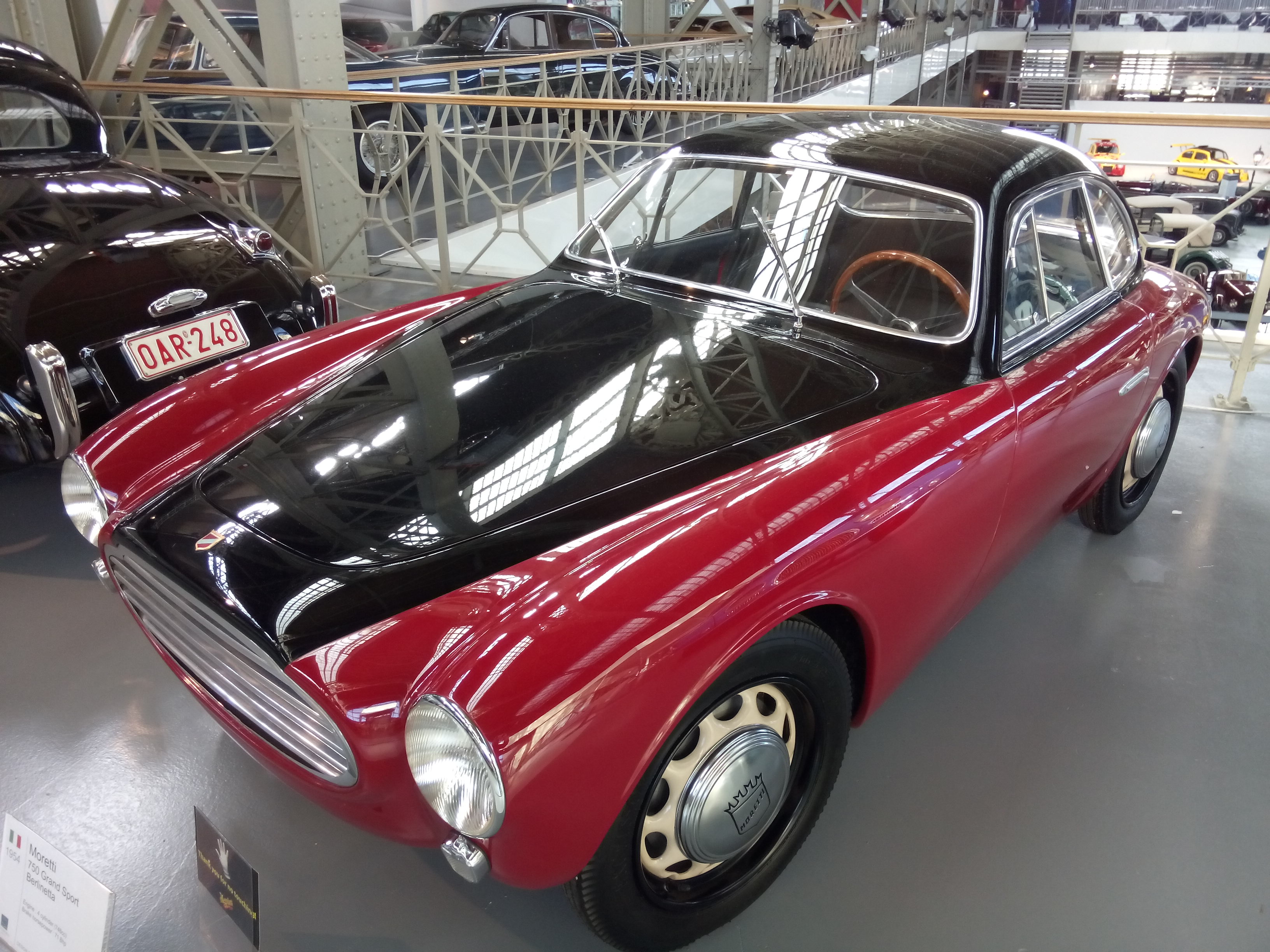
1954 Moretti 750 Grand Sport Berlinetta

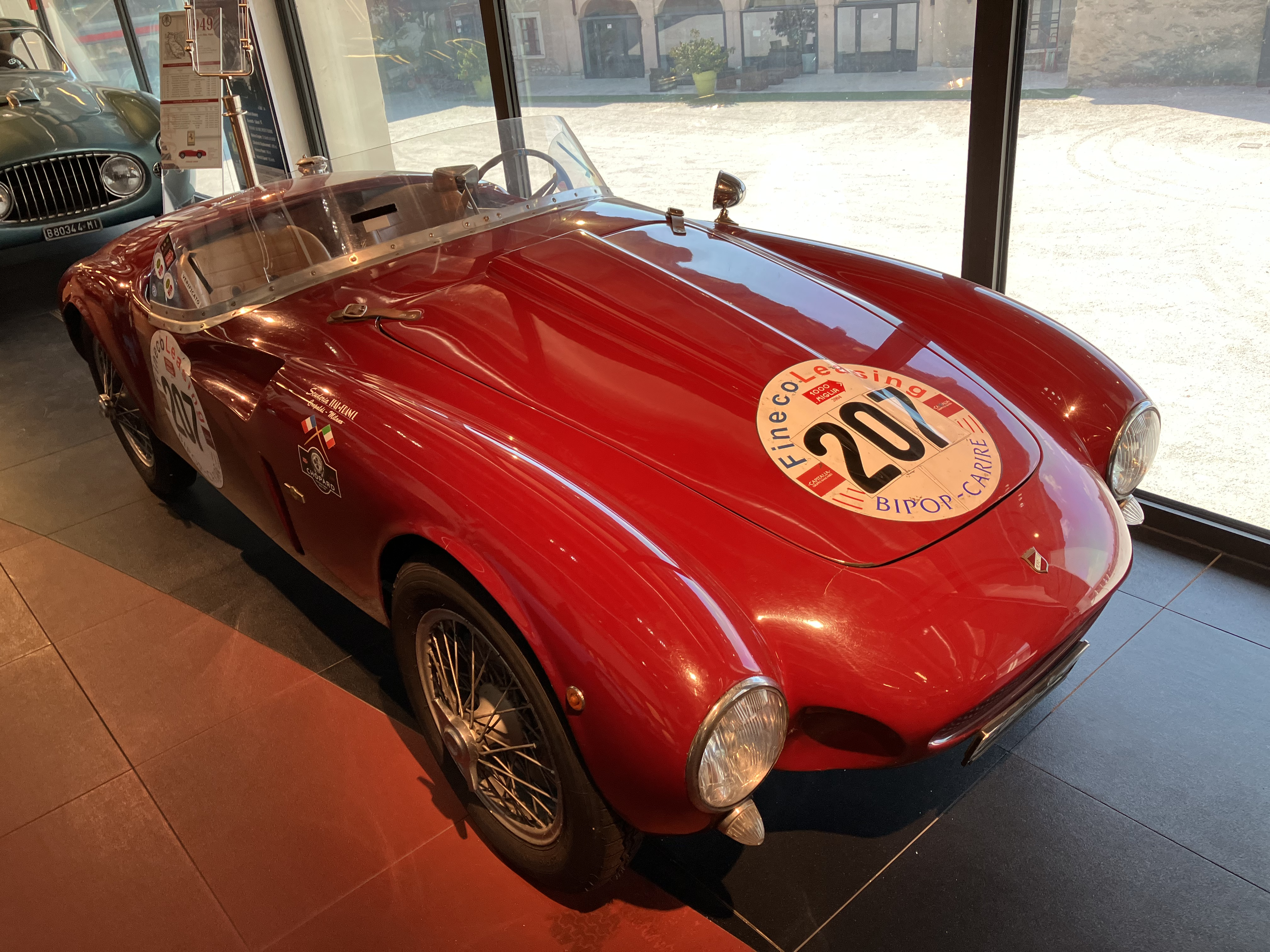
1953 Moretti 750 Sport at the Museo Mille Miglia

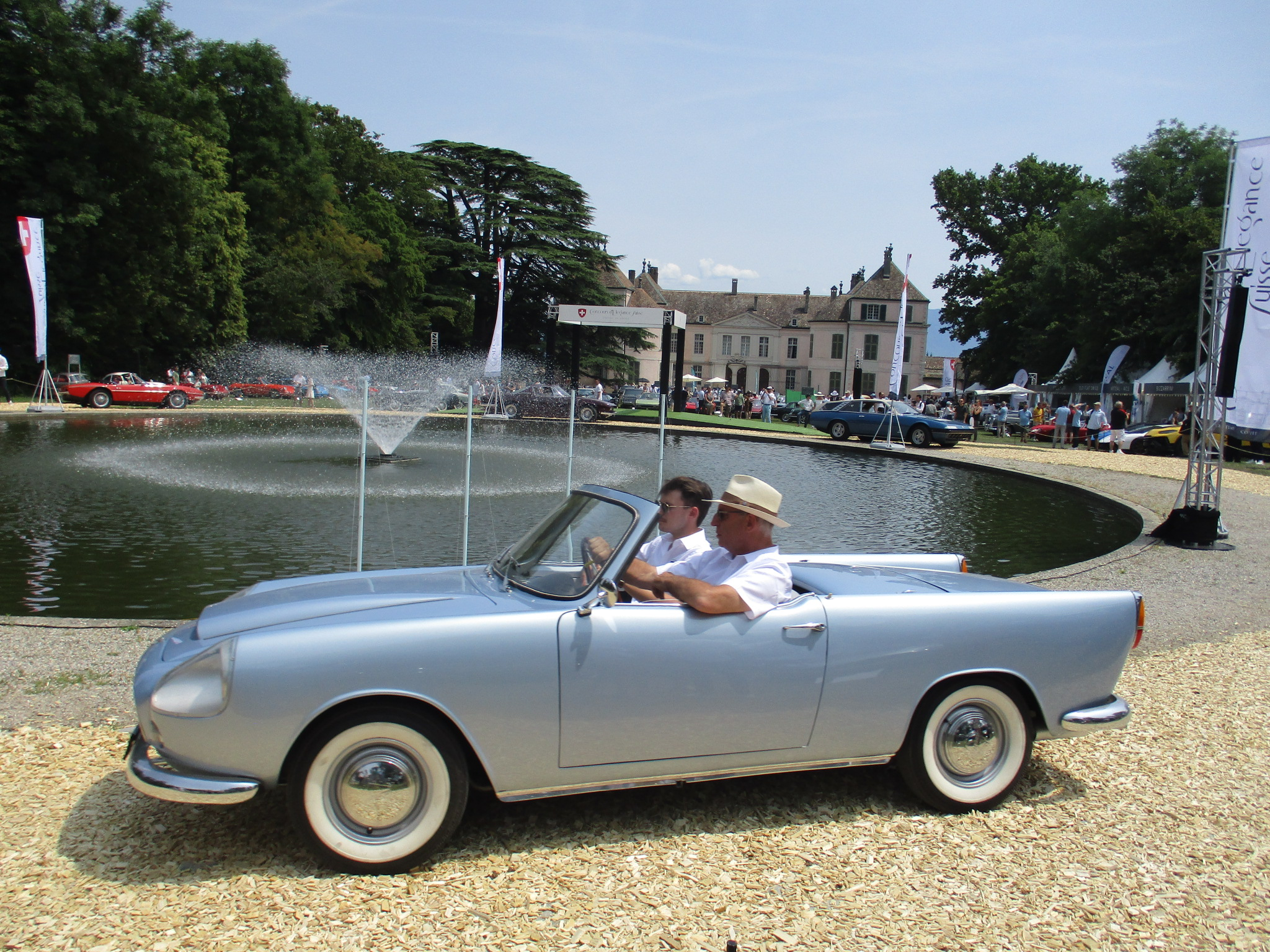
Late 1950s Moretti 750 Tour de Monde

=== Motorcycles ===
In 1934, Moretti entered the motorcycle market, using proprietary engines from Ladetto, DKW, or J.A.P. Built in Macerata, near San Marino, these were light machines, typically using engines ranging from 50 to 250 cc. A twin-cam 125 cc machine with an oval, pressed metal frame appeared in 1946, followed by a 250 cc variant of the same. In 1947 a horizontally opposed twin with bevel-gear driven overhead valves appeared, sold as the Erfim. Moretti's motorcycles were expensive machines and could not compete with mass manufactured models; production ended in 1950 (some sources state 1952).

=== Special-bodied Fiats ===
A major shift in Moretti Motors' operations came in the latter part of the 1950s when they ceased designing and building complete cars. In an effort to reduce costs and overhead, the company switched to using Fiat mechanicals and chassis for all of its conventional automobiles. Despite offering a full range of model versions based on their own "750" (saloon, coupé, spider, estate and more), Moretti had been unable to compete with Fiat's 600, which cost almost half the price and consequently dominated the marketplace. Mass production of all models were subsequently slashed due to continued low sales and financial struggles. However, thanks to the friendship between Giovanni Moretti and Gianni Agnelli, Moretti Motors was able to strike a favorable agreement with Fiat to continue using Fiat chassis for a series of special/low volume models. By late 1961, Moretti had reduced their lineup to custom-bodied coupés and spiders using the mechanicals from various Fiats, including the Fiat 1100/103 H. They soon expanded to provide sporty versions of most of the Fiat range, up to the large Fiat 2300. In this vein, sporty-looking coupés with very similar bodywork utilizing 127, 128, 124, and 132 underpinnings continued to be built in the late sixties and early seventies.

In 1967 Moretti produced only 2,600 cars, in 1973 only 3,292 were produced, and by 1974 production was down to only 1,071. In the seventies, Moretti switched to building mini-offroaders and beach cars on Fiat-basis. The Fiat 500-based "Minimaxi" first appeared in 1970, and was later adapted to take 126 underpinnings. The 127-based "Midimaxi" appeared in 1971. There was also a stretched pickup and van on 127-basis, called the "Paguro", which arrived 1977. In 1979 the Fiat Campagnola-based Moretti Sporting appeared, with a 2.5 liter diesel engine. The very luxurious "127 Vip" and "Ritmo Gold" arrived in 1980. The Panda Rock, which was presented in 1983, was a roofless and rollbar-equipped Panda 4x4 intended for off-roading purposes. A "Midimaxi III serie" was also presented in 1983, based on the most recent version of the 127. In a continuing effort to occupy ever narrower niches left vacant by Fiat themselves, Moretti also offered panel van ("Furgonetta") versions of the Uno and Panda 4x4.

Later, as production continued to fall, Moretti turned to producing personalised conversions of various Fiats such as the Uno, Panda and Regata. At the 1983 Bologna Motor Show a "cabriolet" version of the Fiat Uno was presented. It was actually a cabrio coach rather than a full convertible, retaining the door rails and rear side windows. Equipped with series engines (including a diesel option), it was sold directly through select Fiat dealers in Italy.

In 1989 Moretti produced the "Ital Uno Turbo" which was imported in limited numbers to USA by M.I.K Automotive in North Hollywood, California. The car was based on the Fiat Uno Turbo with a 1.3 L turbo engine and with anti-skid braking system, the car was also fitted with Toyo 13" tires.

Finally, after several years of decline, the Moretti Motor Company officially ceased operations in December 1989.

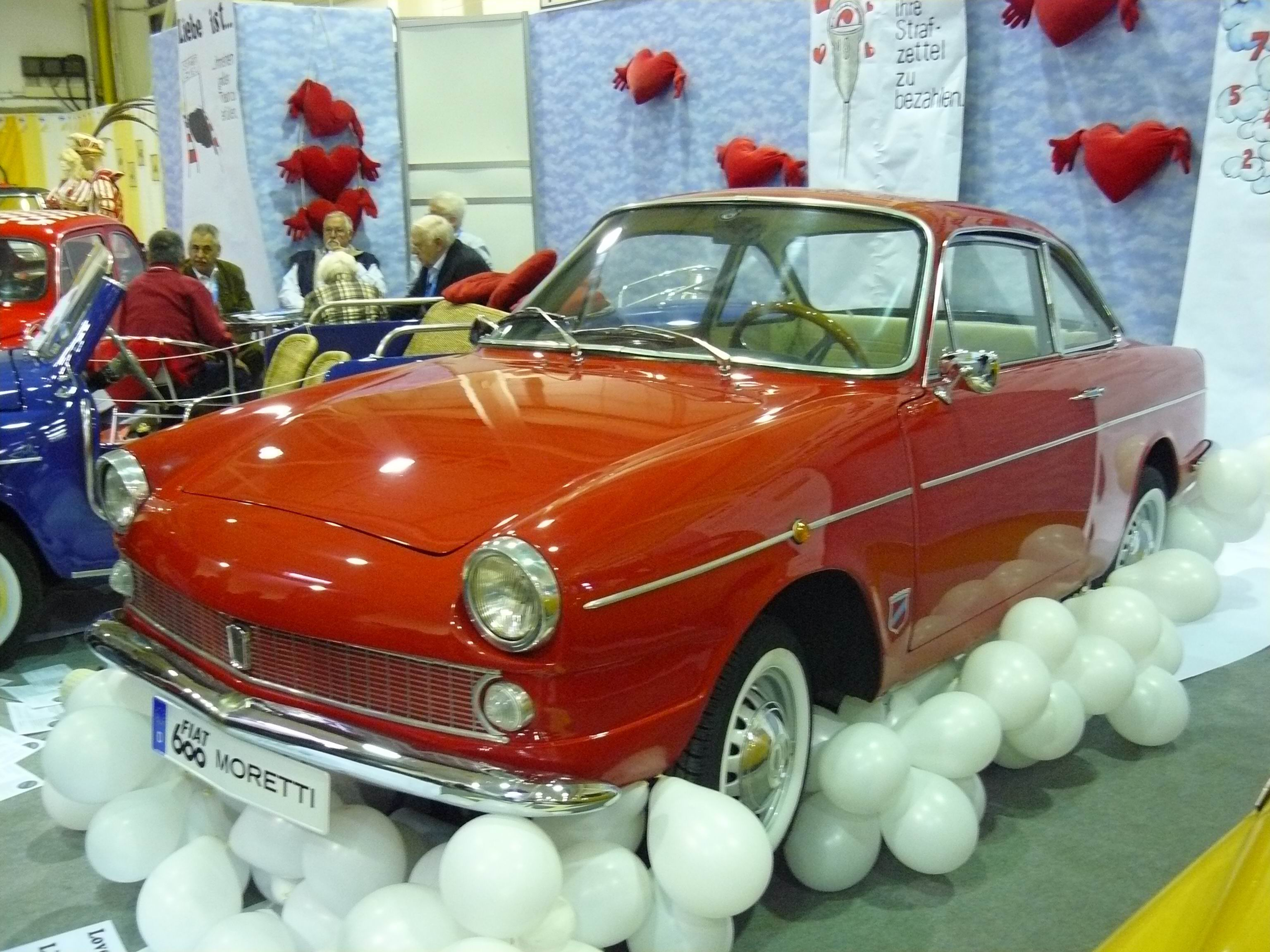
1962 Moretti Fiat 600 Coupé

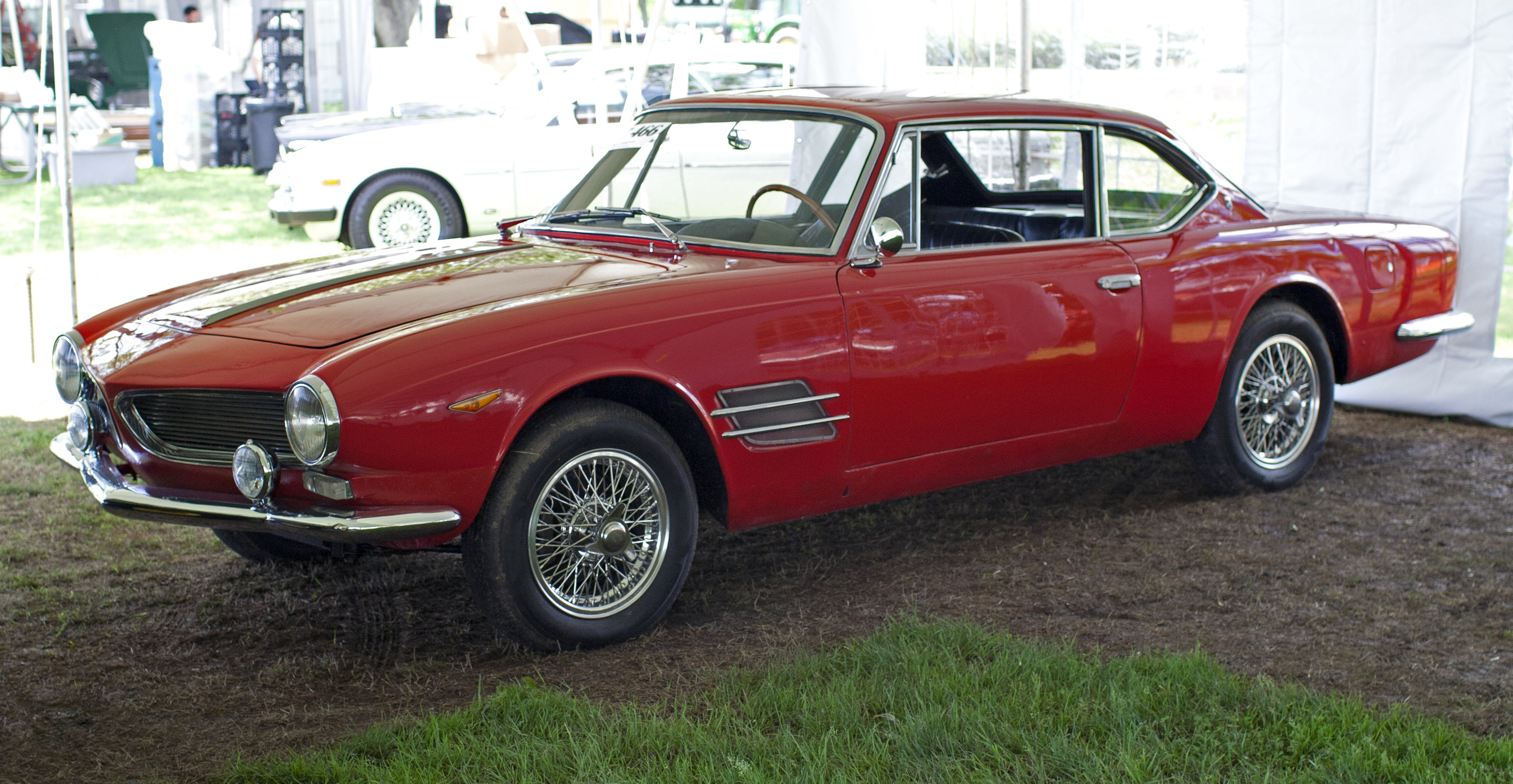
1962 Moretti Fiat 2500 SS Coupé

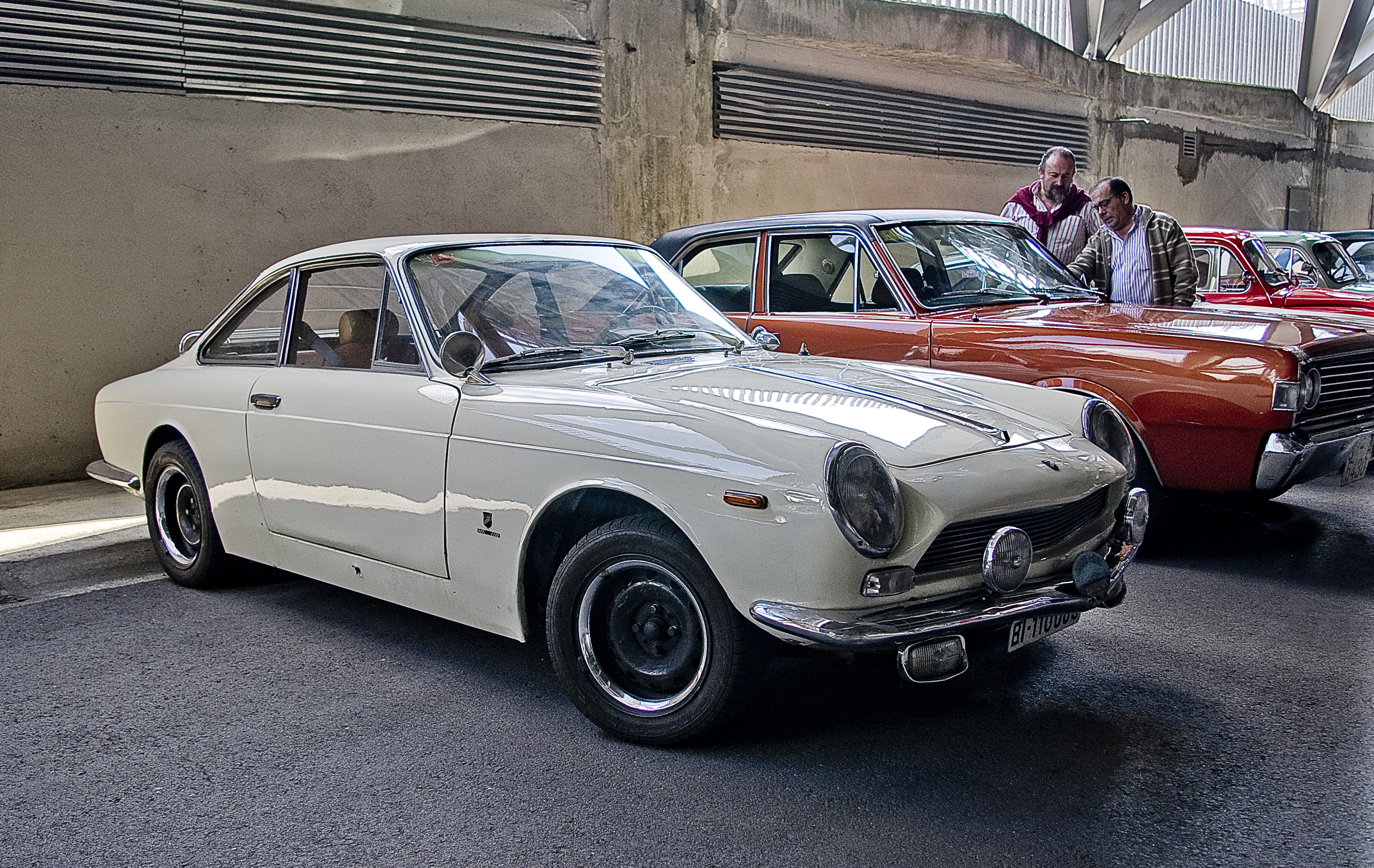
Fiat 1500 SS Moretti Coupé (1967)

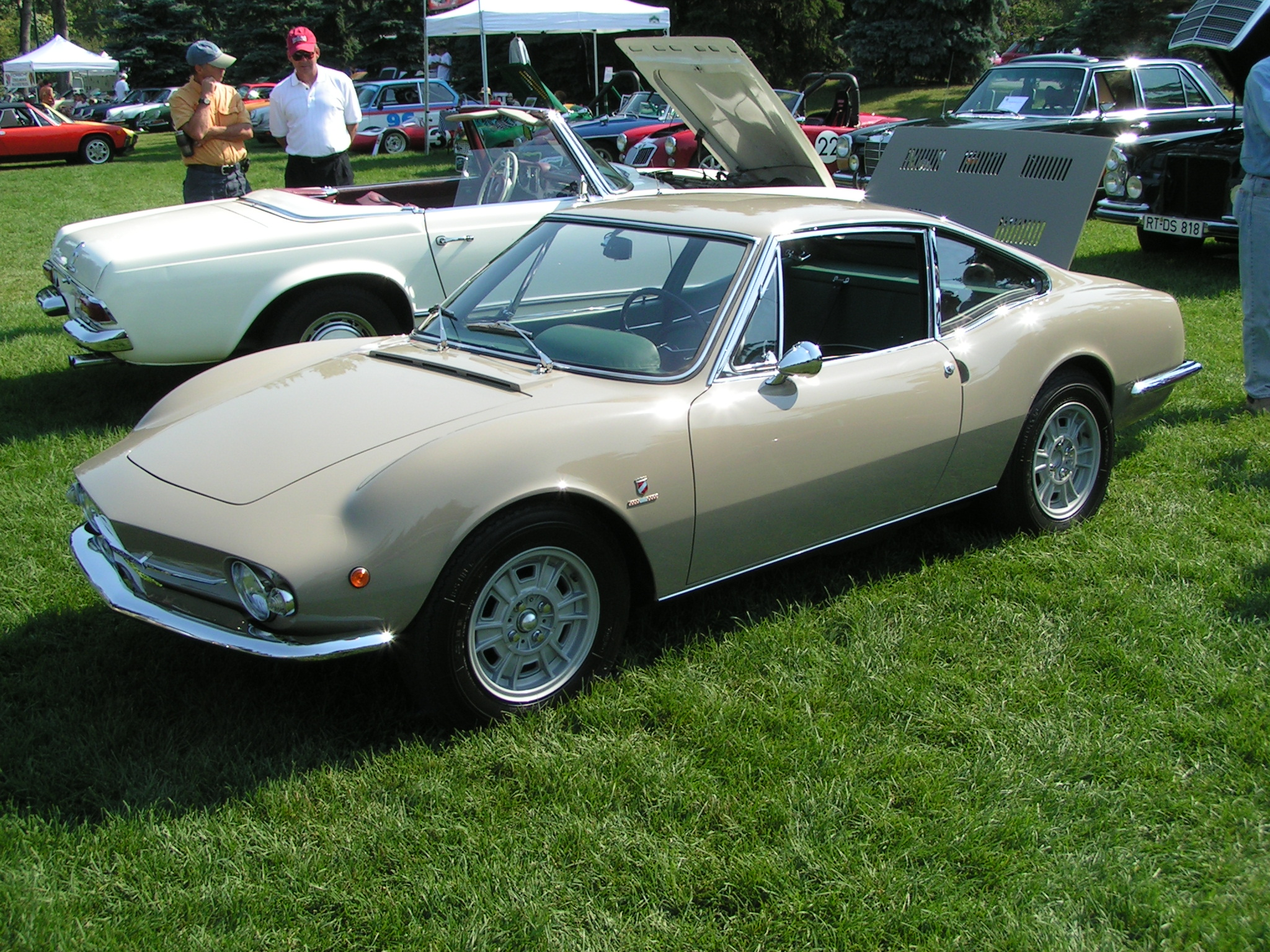
Fiat Moretti Sportiva

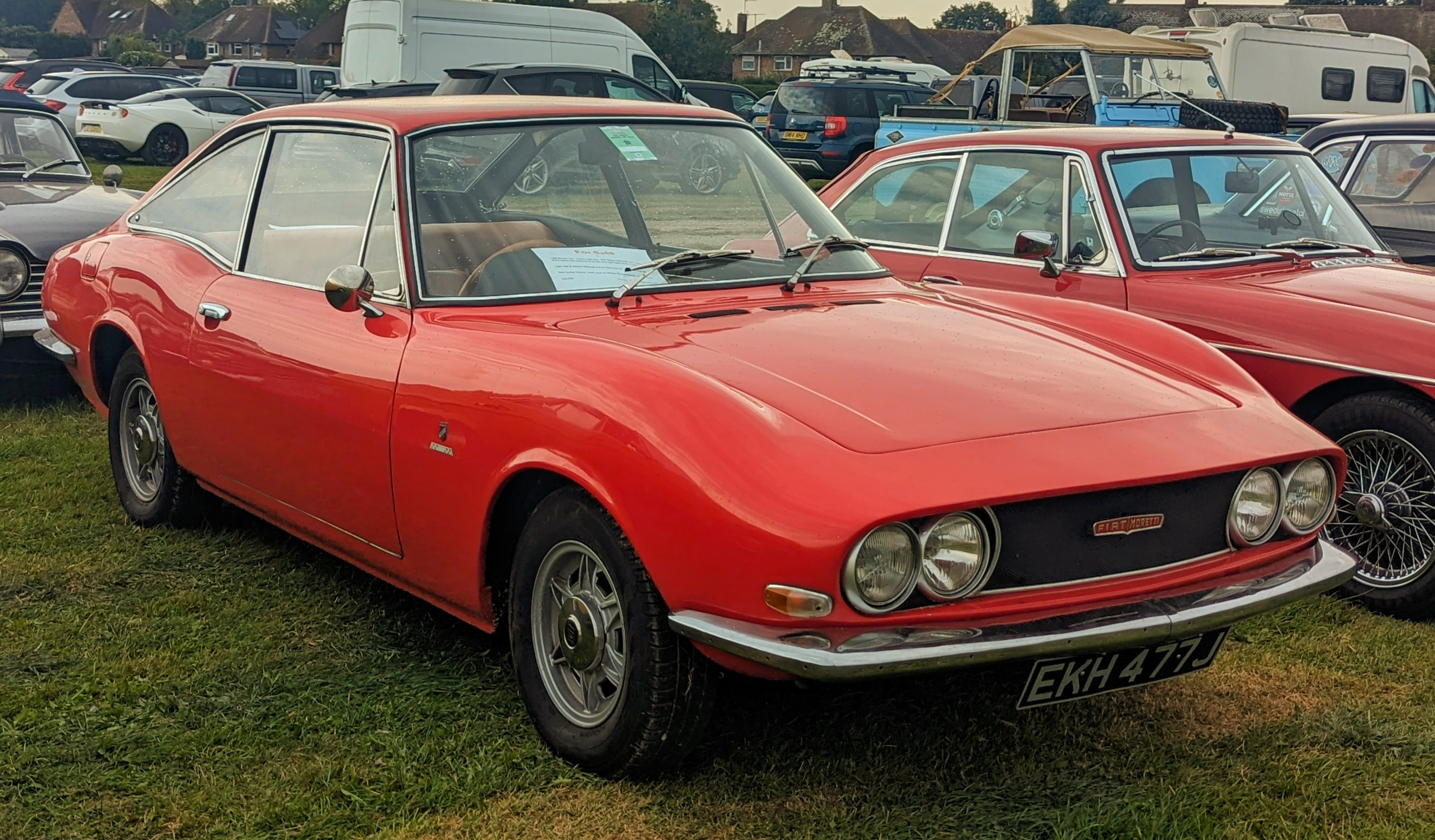
Moretti Fiat 124 Coupé

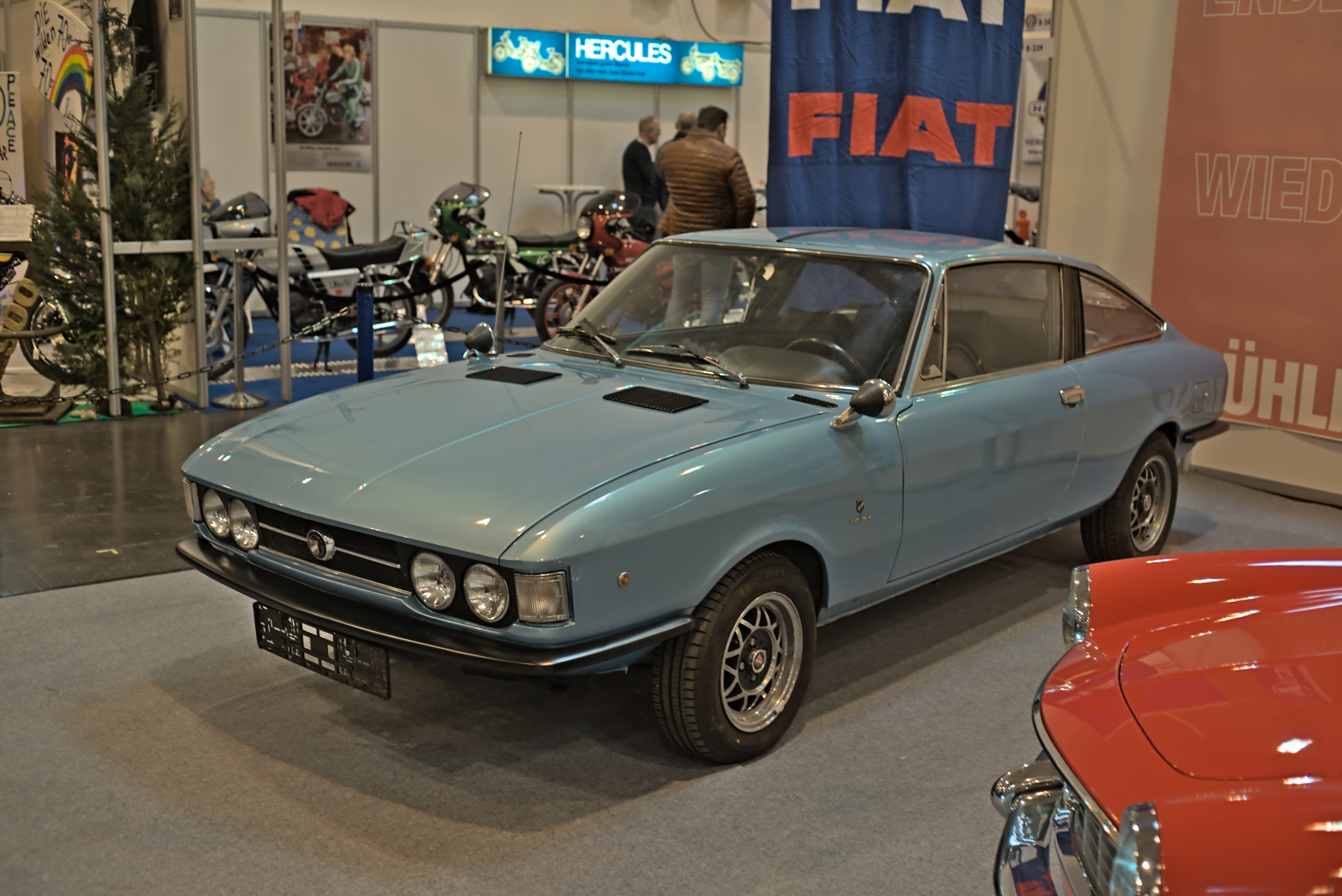
Moretti Fiat 128 Roadster (t-top)

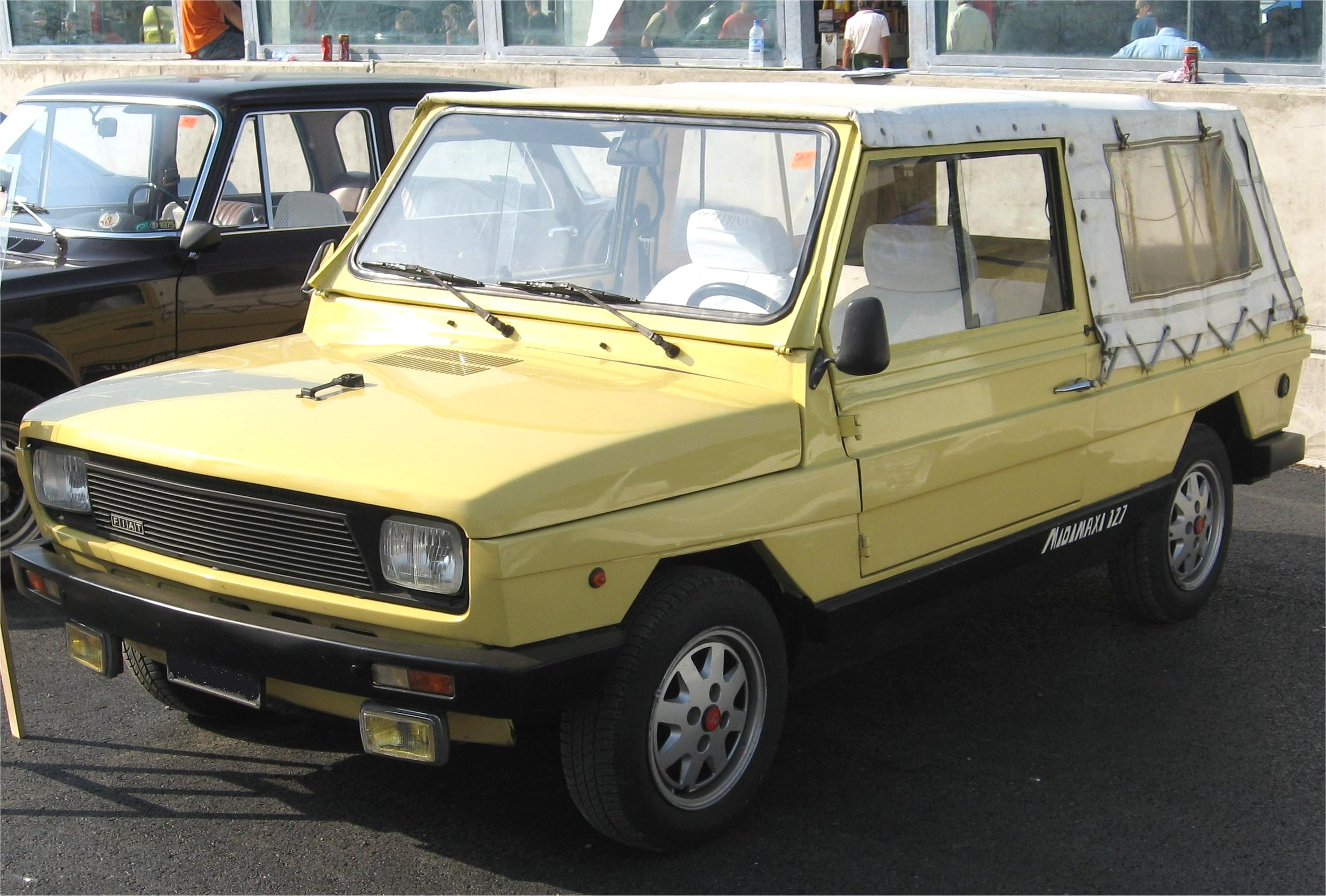
1980 Moretti Midimaxi

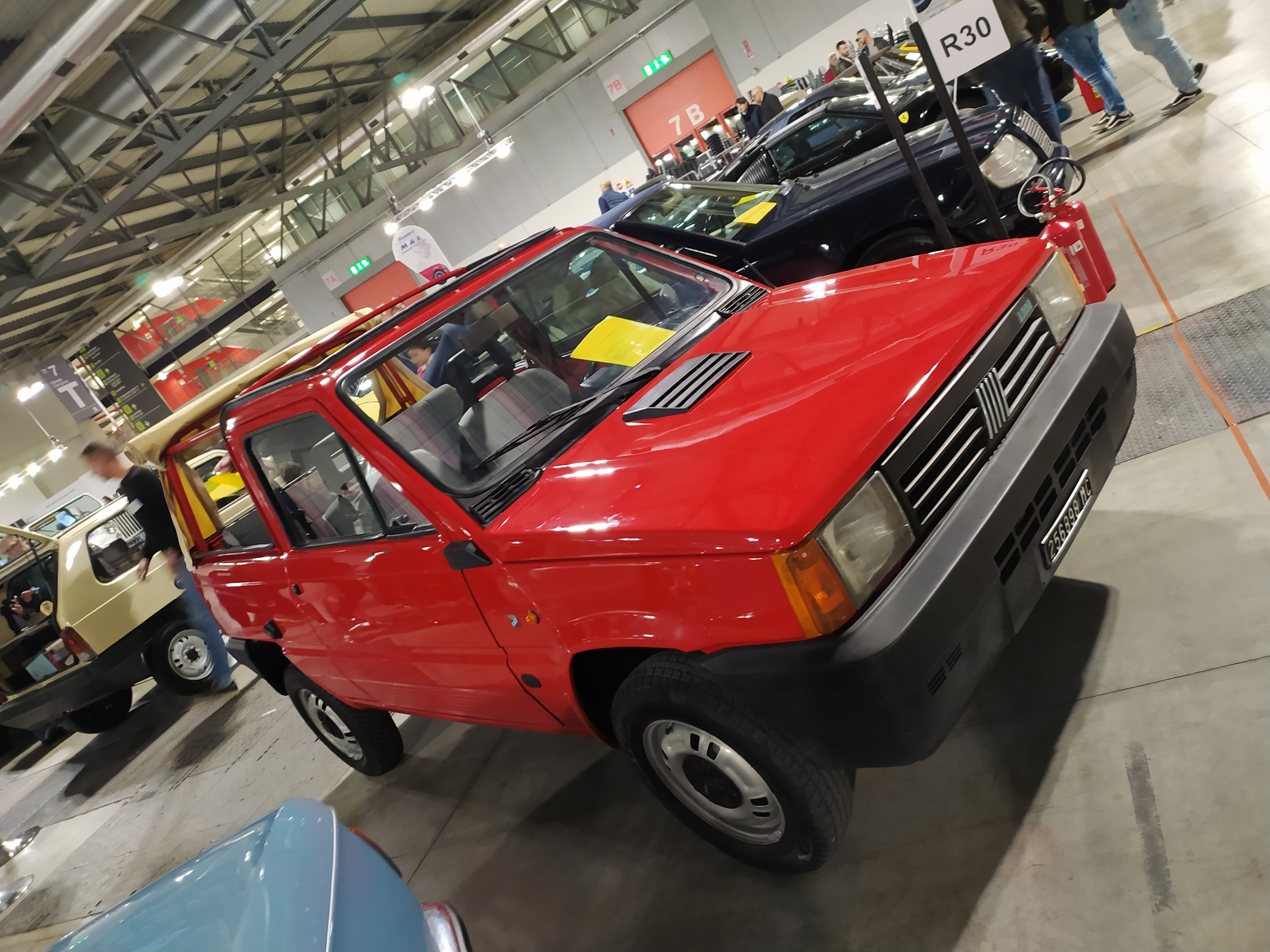
Fiat Moretti Panda Rock

=== Other brands ===
Moretti showed an estate version of the Alfa Romeo Giulietta in 1978. The conversion had a tailgate which reached all the way down to the bumper, even though it retained the original rear doors as well as taillights.

== Main models ==
Own constructions

- Moretti 500
- Moretti Elettroveicoli
- Moretti Cita
- Moretti 600
- Moretti 720-750
- Moretti 1200
- Moretti 1500

Fiat-based
- Fiat Formula Junior
- Fiat 1100 Moretti
- Fiat 1200 Moretti
- Fiat 1500 Moretti
- Fiat 2200 Moretti
- Fiat Moretti 2300 S/2500 SS
- Fiat 600 Moretti
- Fiat 500 Moretti Coupé
- Fiat Moretti Sportiva
- Fiat 128 Moretti (Italian WP entry)
- Fiat 126 Moretti Minimaxi
- Fiat 127 Moretti Midimaxi
- Fiat 132 Moretti
- Fiat Panda Moretti Rock
- Fiat Uno Moretti Folk
- Ital Turbo Uno by Moretti (1989)

== See also ==
- List of Italian companies
- List of motorcycle manufacturers
