= Fiat 500 Moretti Coupe =

Small city car

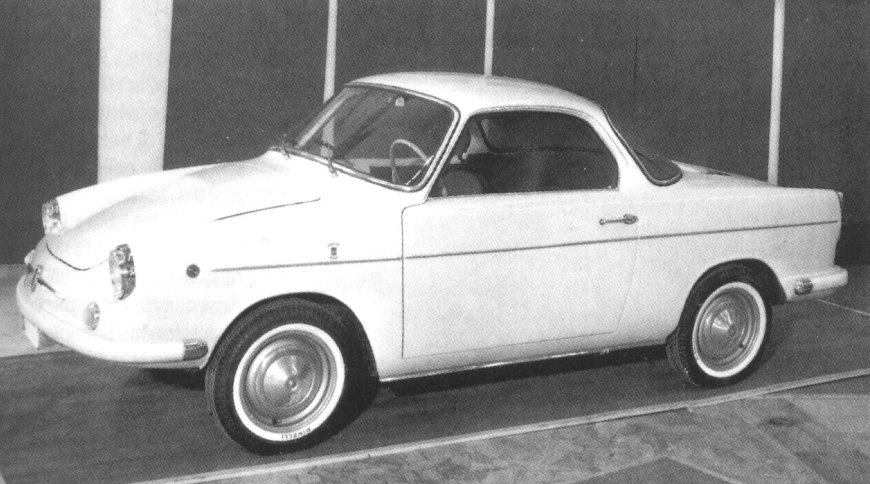
- The prototype presented at the 1960 Turin Motor Show.

Overview
- Type: Coupé
- Manufacturer: Moretti Motor Company
- Production: 1961-1969
- Designer: Giovanni Michelotti

Body and chassis
- Class: City Car (A)
- Body style: 2-door coupé
- Layout: Rear-engine, rear-wheel drive
- Related: Fiat 500

Powertrain
- Engine: 500 cc gasoline I2
- Power output: 22 hp
- Transmission: 4-speed manual

Dimensions
- Wheelbase: 1,840 mm (72.4 in)
- Length: 3,450 mm (135.8 in)
- Width: 1,340 mm (52.8 in)
- Height: 1,250 mm (49.2 in)
- Curb weight: 435 kg (959 lb)

The Fiat 500 Moretti Coupe is a rear-engine, two-seat, rear wheel drive coupé based on the chassis and engine of the Fiat 500, produced by the Moretti Motor Company from 1961 to 1969.

== History ==
The Fiat 500 Moretti Coupe started as a prototype first displayed in the 1960 Turin Auto Show, before starting hand-built production the following year, in 1961. The production model featured a longer and less curved roof line, as well as a flatter front fascia with a near-right angle at the front of the hood. Both versions were designed by Giovanni Michelotti.

In 1965, the Moretti 500 coupe switched from being built off of the chassis of the 500 D to the chassis of the 500 F.

A higher-end variant was added in 1966, known as the 595 SS. This version had its engine upgraded and tuned to make 28 PS (21 kW), which changed the original top speed of 115 to 130 km/h (71 to 81 mph). Other changes within this variant included extra gauges on the dashboard (a tachometer and an oil pressure gauge), as well as a modified exhaust system.

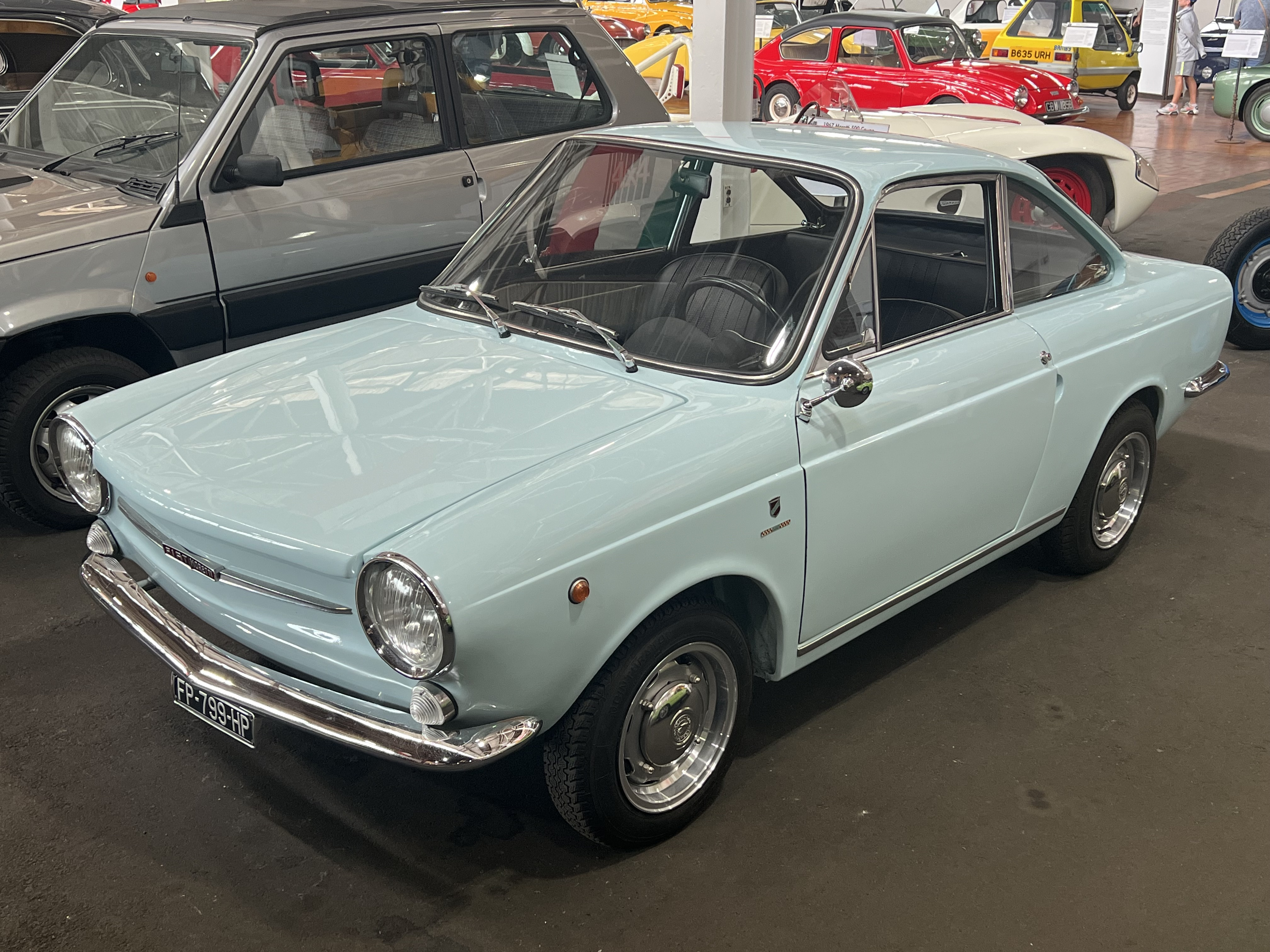
1967 Moretti 500 Coupé

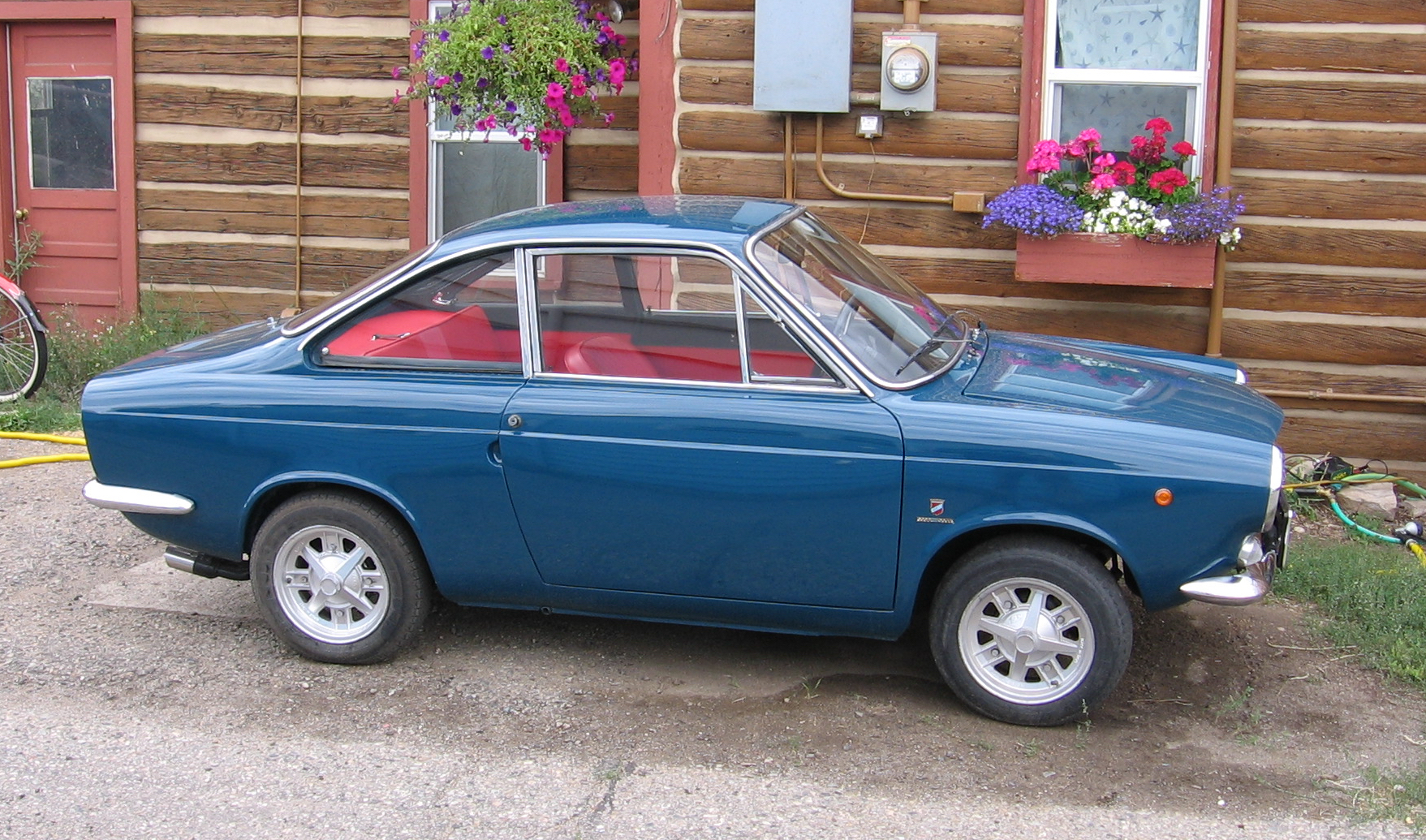
Side view of a 1969 Moretti 500 Coupé

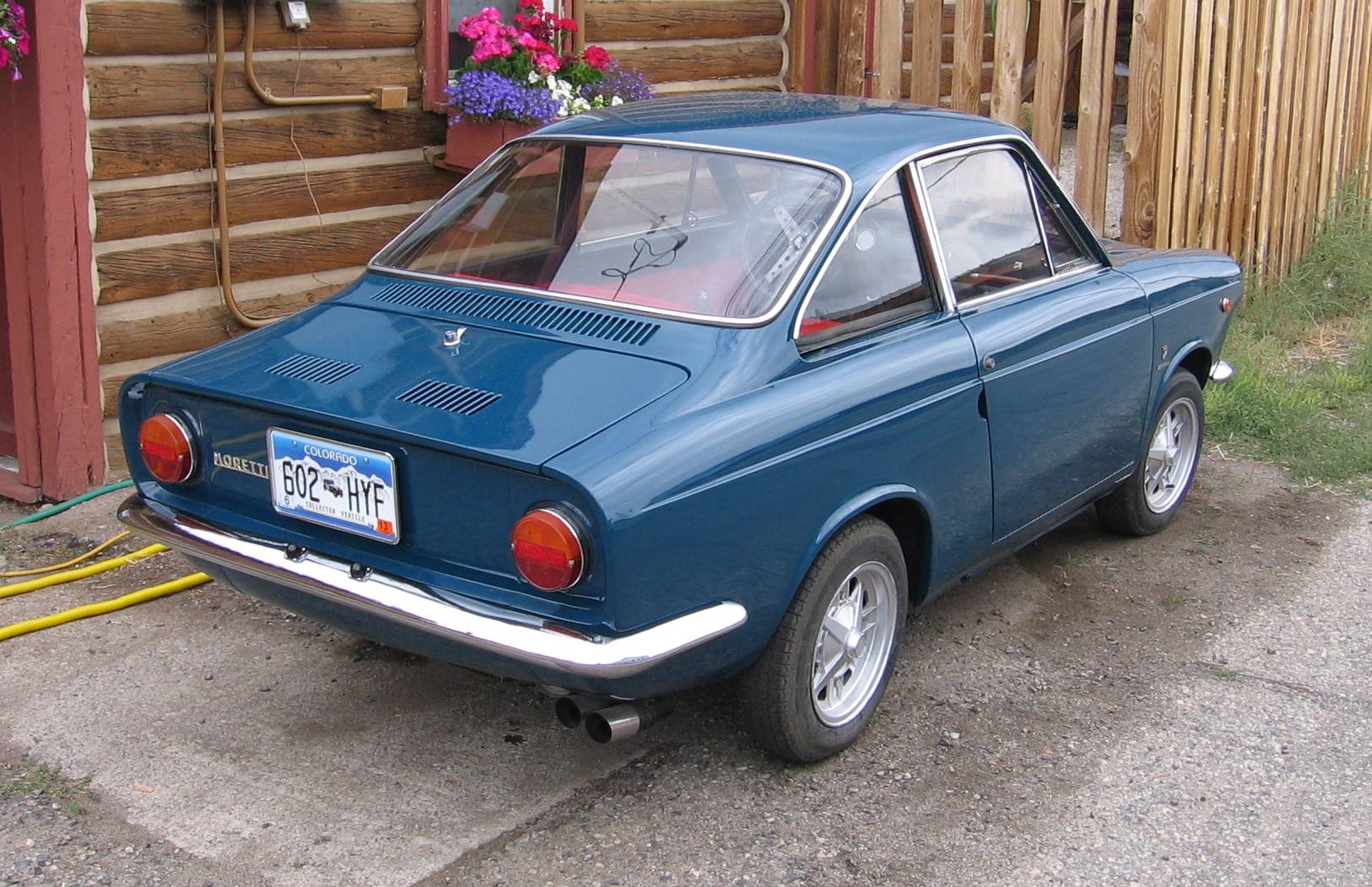
Rear view (1969)
