= Fiat Panda =

City car by Fiat since 1980

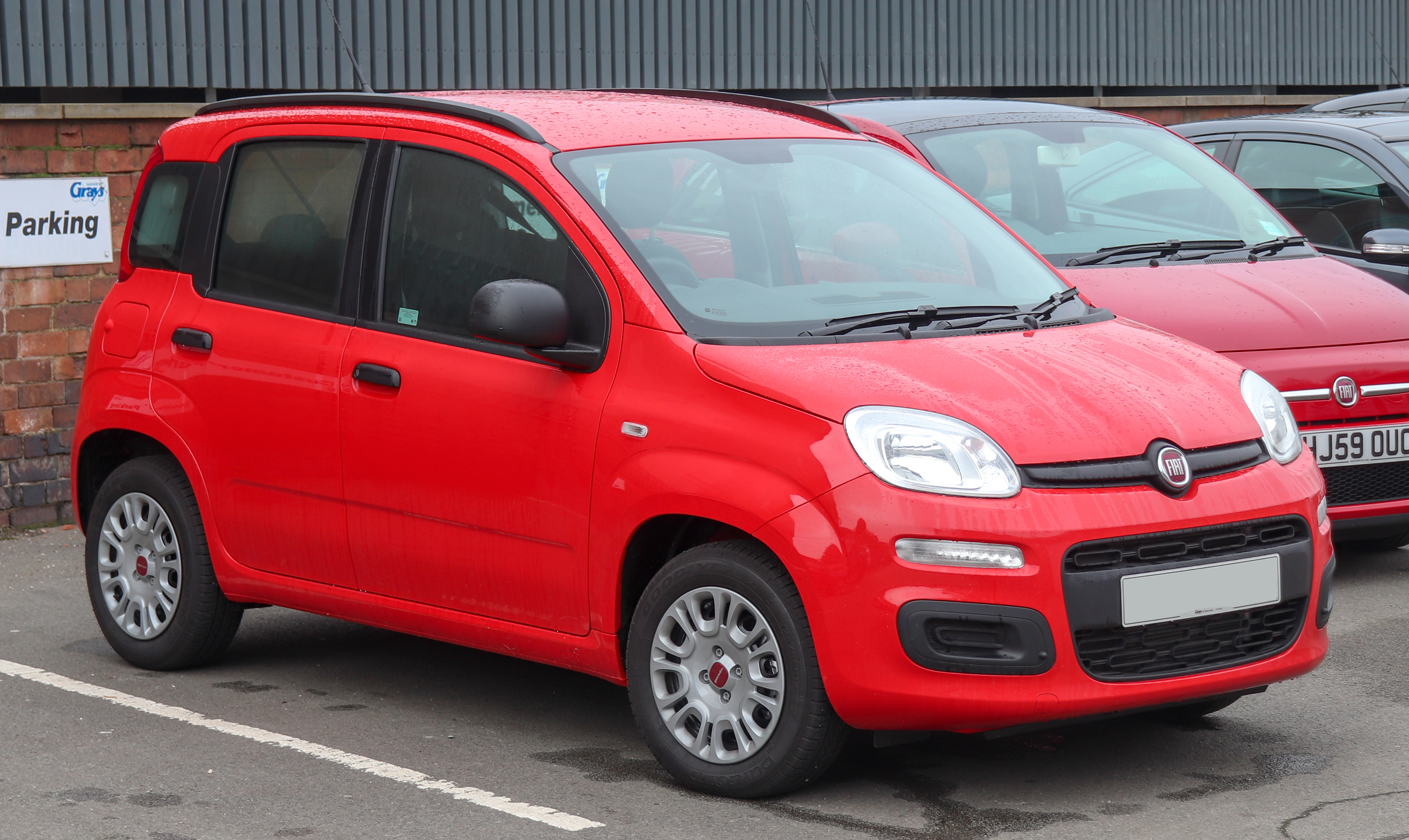
- Third generation Panda

Overview
- Manufacturer: Fiat (Note: Fiat Auto (1980–2007); Fiat Group Automobiles (2007–2014); FCA Italy (2014–2023); Stellantis Europe (2023–present))
- Production: 1980–present

Body and chassis
- Class: City car/A-segment; Supermini/B-segment (Grande Panda)

Chronology
- Predecessor: Fiat 126 (first generation); Fiat 127

The Fiat Panda is a city car manufactured and marketed by Fiat. The first generation Panda, introduced in 1980, was a two-box, three-door hatchback designed by Giorgetto Giugiaro and Aldo Mantovani of Italdesign and was manufactured through 2003, with an all-wheel drive variant in 1983. SEAT of Spain marketed a variation of the first generation Panda under license to Fiat, initially as the Panda and subsequently as the Marbella (1986–1998).

The second-generation Panda, launched in 2003 as a 5-door hatchback, was designed by Giuliano Biasio of Bertone, and won the European Car of the Year in 2004. The third-generation Panda debuted at the Frankfurt Motor Show in September 2011, was designed at Fiat Centro Stilo under the direction of Roberto Giolito and remains in production in Italy at Pomigliano d'Arco. The fourth-generation Panda is marketed as the Grande Panda, to differentiate it from the third generation that is sold alongside it. Developed under Stellantis, the Grande Panda is produced in Serbia.

In 40 years, Panda production has reached over 7.8 million, of those, approximately 4.5 million were the first generation. In early 2020, its 23-year production was counted as the twenty-ninth most long-lived single generation car in history by Autocar. During its initial design phase, Italdesign referred to the car as la Zero. Fiat later proposed the name Rustica. Ultimately, the Panda was named after Empanda, the Roman goddess and patroness of travelers.

== First generation (1980) ==
First generation
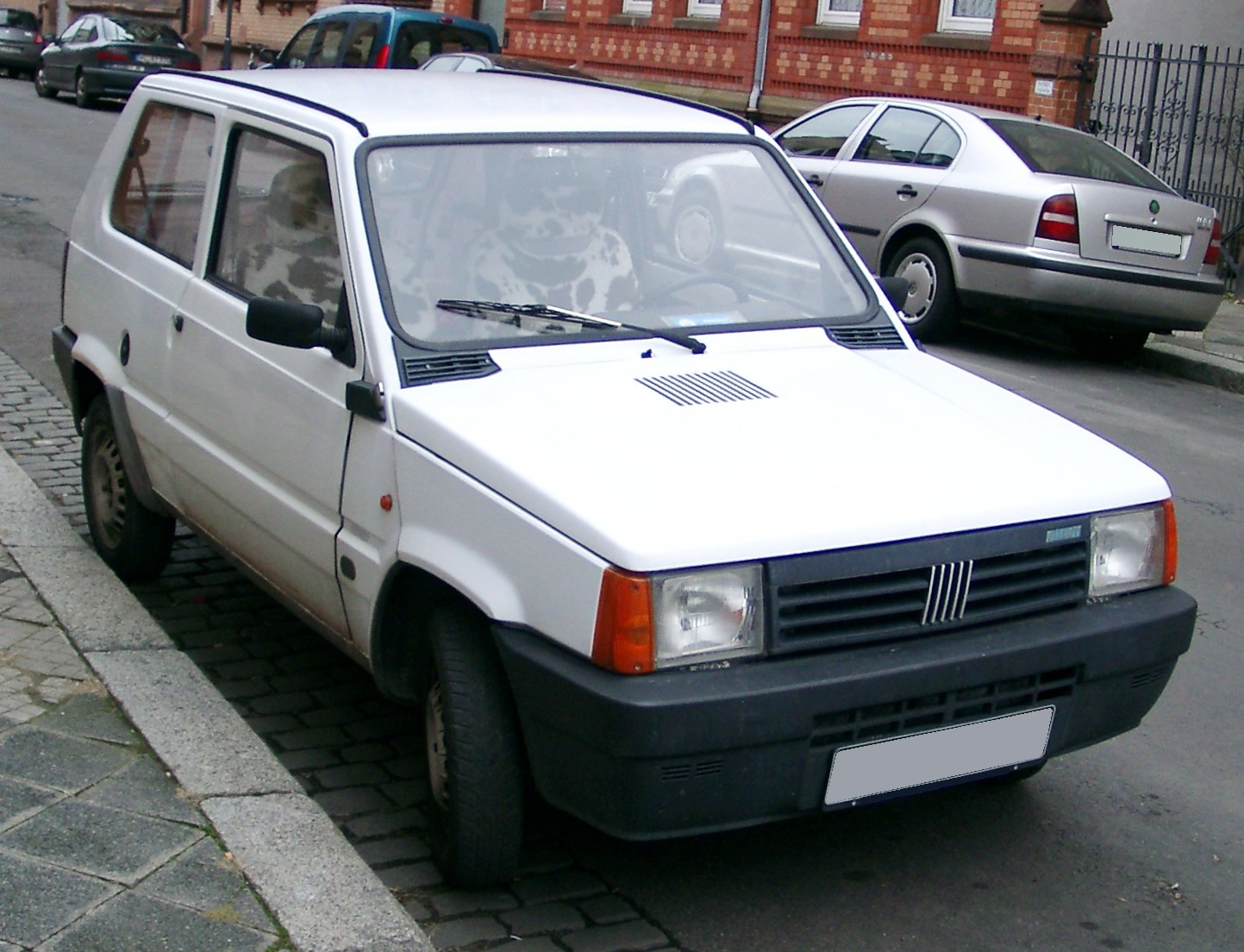
- Fiat Panda, second facelift

Overview
- Model code: 141
- Also called: SEAT Panda/Marbella
- Production: 1980–2003 (4,491,000 units)
- Assembly: Italy: Mirafiori, Turin; Desio (Autobianchi); Termini Imerese; Lambrate (Innocenti)
- Designer: Giorgetto Giugiaro and Aldo Mantovani, Italdesign

Body and chassis
- Body style: 3-door hatchback 3-door van
- Layout: Front-engine, front-wheel-drive or four-wheel-drive
- Platform: Type Zero (Tipo Zero)
- Related: SEAT Marbella

Powertrain
- Engine: Petrol: 652 cc I2; 769 cc I4; 899/903 cc I4; 965 cc I4; 999 cc I4; 1108 cc I4; Diesel: 1301 cc I4; Electric: 19 PS (14 kW); 24 PS (18 kW)

Dimensions
- Wheelbase: 2,160 mm (85.0 in)
- Length: 3,380 mm (133.1 in)
- Width: 1,460 mm (57.5 in)
- Height: 1,445 mm (56.9 in)
- Kerb weight: 715 kg (1,576 lb) (1980 Panda 750)

Chronology
- Predecessor: Fiat 126 (first generation)
- Successor: Fiat Cinquecento

Introduced at the March 1980 Geneva Motor Show, the Panda was internally designated as Type 141 and was designed by Giorgetto Giugiaro and Aldo Mantovani of the newly formed Italdesign. From its inception, the Panda was designed as an inexpensive, easily maintained, utilitarian, and robustly simple car. Introduced to the press in December 1979; the first generation went on sale in Italy in late February, ahead of its Geneva première. Fiat launched right-hand drive models for the UK market in May 1981.

=== Development ===
As the first time Fiat had entrusted the development of a high-volume model to an outside company, Giugiaro and Mantovani spent 15 days in the summer of 1976 in Porto Cervo, Sardinia designing the Panda, using the working name Zero. Giugiaro developed the packaging and styling; Mantovani conceived the car's technical approach.

Fiat CEO Carlo De Benedetti's design brief specified a straightforward 'container' with a spacious and spartan interior, weighing and costing no more than the Fiat 126 it was replacing, and having a similar design approach as the Citroën 2CV or Renault 4. In the late 1950s, the head of Renault, Pierre Dreyfus, had called for the Renault R4 to have an egalitarian approach, like blue jeans, "which people can wear in any situation if you do away with the pretension of snobbism and social conformity".

During the design gestation, Giugiaro took particular inspiration from a folding lounge chair in conceiving the seats of the Zero; simple, easy to maintain, modular, inexpensive to manufacture. To ensure its practicality, he conceived that the Panda's cargo area should accommodate no less than two 50-liter wine demijohns, along with a full complement of passengers. From its inception, the project would use monocoque construction with a nearly flat floor and a sufficiently high roof to accommodate upright seating.

Giugiaro and Mantovani completed the design for its 7 August deadline, discovering only then that De Benedetti had left Fiat.

Despite De Benedetti's departure, Italdesign presented Fiat with two full-scale models, four alternative side designs, an interior buck or mockup and a comprehensive study of the Panda's competition, as well as a series of tempera renderings by Giugiaro. Under the prototyping designation Progetto 141, Fiat subsequently commissioned Italdesign to create production studies, a master model, provisional tooling and pre-production prototypes. Within a year, Italdesign had made 20 rolling chassis.

In February 1978, Fiat test-marketed prototypes to potential customers and dealers at an unpublicized event in Milan's Novegro Park. On response cards distributed by Fiat's sales department, participants evaluated the design's exterior and interior appearance and finish, spaciousness, instruments and controls, engine size, price, and its provisional name: Rustica.

In January 1979, production was delayed by protracted union negotiations, specifically over Fiat's plans to move production from plants in Cassino, Sulmona and Termini Imerese to Turin and Desio. An agreement was reached between December 1979 and January 1980, with production scheduled for the Termini Imerese Autobianchi di Desio plants.

On 26 February 1980 Fiat presented production models to President Sandro Pertini, in the gardens of Rome's Quirinal Palace, and the car officially debuted in Geneva on 5 March – carrying the name Panda, after Empanda, the Roman goddess and patroness of travelers. At the time of its introduction, the World Wildlife Fund had resisted Fiat's using the Panda name, but acquiesced when Fiat made a substantial financial contribution. As local custom allowed the writing of a check on any surface, Fiat delivered the contribution, written on the hood of an actual Panda.

In the two months following the Geneva Motor Show, Fiat received over 70,000 orders.

=== Design ===
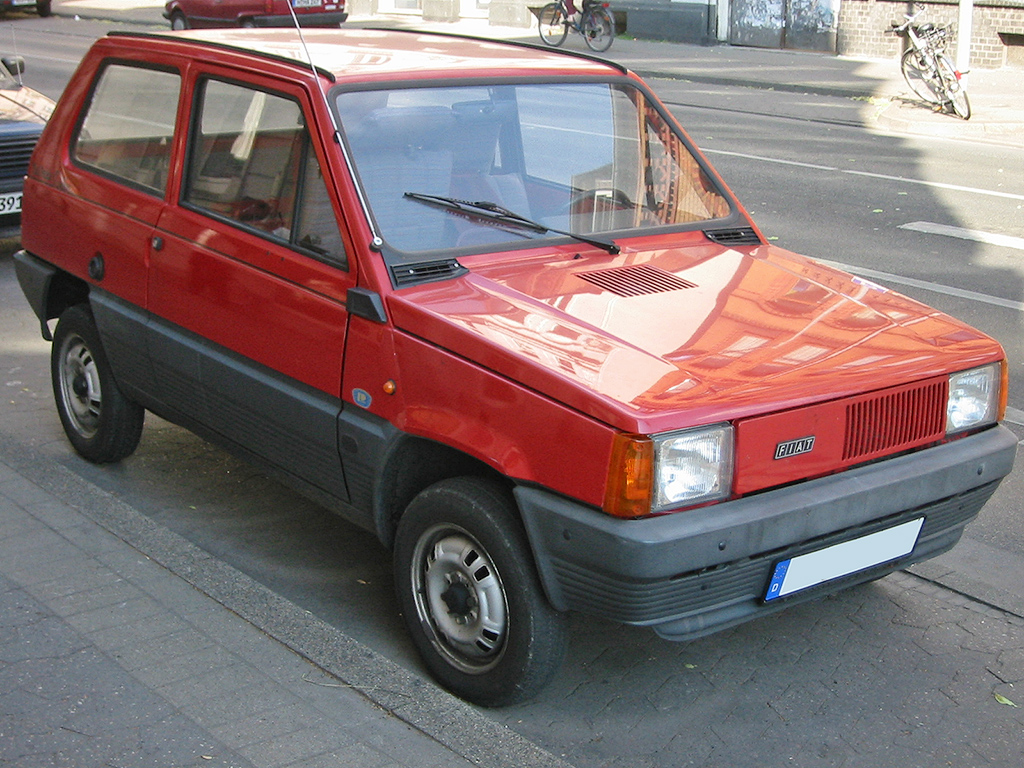
Front of Fiat Panda, launch model

Following the brief of creating a straightforward, practical design in the vein of the Citroën 2CV and the Renault 4, Italdesign's work highlighted utilitarian practicality throughout the design. Just prior to the Panda's debut at the 1980 Geneva Salon de l'Auto, Giugiaro described his design intent in a 1980 interview with Turinese newspaper La Stampa, published in February 1980:

«La Panda (...) è come un paio di jeans, che sono poi un vestire semplice, pratico, senza fronzoli. (...) Ho cercato di portare in questa auto lo spìrito delle costruzioni militari, in particolare degli elicotteri, ossia di mezzi leggeri, razionali, nati per assolvere nel modo migliore a certi scopi».

The Panda is like a pair of jeans: a simple, practical article of clothing without pretense. I tried to give it the essential quality of a military design – in particular a helicopter: something light, rational, and optimized for a specific purpose.

— Giorgetto Giugiaro

One of the more noted design features was a highly flexible interior including a seven-position adjustable rear seat that could, via a series of adjustable lateral tubes, fold flat into a provisional bed, fold into a V shape to support awkward loads, or easily and quickly be removed altogether to increase the overall load space. Foregoing sprung upholstery, simple padded fabric seat covers, and fabric door trim could be removed and washed. Likewise, the dashboard used a padded, washable fabric supported by a simple tube, creating a long, flexible storage pocket, accompanied by rigid plastic door storage pockets. A simple ashtray could slide along the support tube or be detached completely.

Cargo volume could accommodate 280 litres within the trunk area or could expand to 1000 litres with the rear seat removed – in either case unencumbered by the spare wheel, which was stored in the engine compartment. Exposed painted sheet metal comprised much of the interior's exposed surfaces. The interior rear-view mirror had no day/night adjustment, and fresh air ventilation was oriented solely for demisting the windshield. The instrument cluster did contain an upper heating vent. Without fresh air venting to the interior via dash outlets, side windows featured vent windows and optional pop-out rear windows.

Luigi Maglione, Fiat's marketing strategist, was perplexed when first seeing the interior design, suggesting the interior mock-up was missing. Fiat's new CEO, Nicola Tufarelli clarified that the rustic interiors were in fact the final design, ready for launch.

With an overall aerodynamic coefficient lower than the Fiat 127's, in spite of the blocky shape, the first Pandas featured a recess in the adjacent bodywork rather than door handles. It has completely flat glass in all windows, which reduced weight and made them inexpensive to manufacture, as well as easy to replace and interchangeable left to right. Fiat, in fact, had difficulty finding a manufacturer for the highly simplified glass. The engine bay was designed to accept either a transverse or longitudinal engine configuration: in practice, the simple sheet metal, body-colored, asymmetrical grille was positioned either with its intake on the left for the air-cooled Panda 30 and, turned "upside-down", on the right for the water-cooled Panda 45.

The bodyside panels were continuously welded to the roof panel and covered with a full-length black moulding – eliminating an expensive sheet metal fold, self-forming a rain gutter, and improving aerodynamics. Owing to the car's flat sides, the lower section of the doors were corrugated to give them additional strength and to resist "drumming". Much like earlier French counterparts, the Panda could be specified with a two-piece roll forward canvas roof. A scratch-resistant paint on the lowest portion of the side panels complemented resin, dent-resistant bumpers. In 2019, an example of the Panda 30 belonging to the FCA Heritage collection was exhibited at the Triennale di Milano.

=== Launch model (1980) ===
Mechanically the first Pandas shared engines and transmissions with the Fiat 127 and, in certain territories, the air-cooled 652 cc two-cylinder powerplant of the Fiat 126. Rear suspension used a solid axle suspended on leaf springs. Later versions added mechanical improvements while retaining a robust simplicity throughout its model life.

Launch models included the Panda 30, powered by a longitudinally-mounted air cooled 652 cc straight-two-cylinder engine derived from the 126, and the Panda 45, with a transversely-mounted water cooled 903 cc (FIAT 100 series) four-cylinder from the 127. In September 1982, Fiat added another engine to the line-up: the Panda 34 used an 843 cc water-cooled unit, derived from that in the 850. It was originally reserved for export to France, Belgium, Germany, and the Netherlands.

Fiat launched the Panda 45 Super at the Paris Motor Show later in 1982, with previous specification models continuing as the "Comfort" trim. The Super offered an optional five-speed gearbox. Minor styling changes to the Super included Fiat's revised corporate grille with five diagonal silver bars. The earlier grille design (metal with slots on one side) continued on the Comfort models until the next major revision of the line-up. A 30 Super was added in February 1983, offering the Super trim combined with the smaller engine.

The Panda 4x4 was launched in June 1983, powered by a 965 cc engine with 48 bhp (36 kW) derived from the Autobianchi A112 or Fiat 100 series engine. Known simply as the Panda 4x4, this model was the first small, transverse-engined production car to have a 4WD system. The system itself was manually selectable, with an ultra-low first gear. Under normal (on-road) conditions starting was from second, with the fifth gear having the same ratio as fourth in the normal Panda. Austrian company Steyr-Puch supplied the entire drivetrain (clutch, gearbox, power take-off, three-piece prop shaft, rear live axle including differential and brakes) to the plant at Termini Imerese where it was fitted to the reinforced bodyshell. In November 1984 trim levels were named "L", "CL", and "S". Specifications and detailing were modified across the range, using the Fiat corporate grille on all trims. Mechanically the range remained largely unchanged.

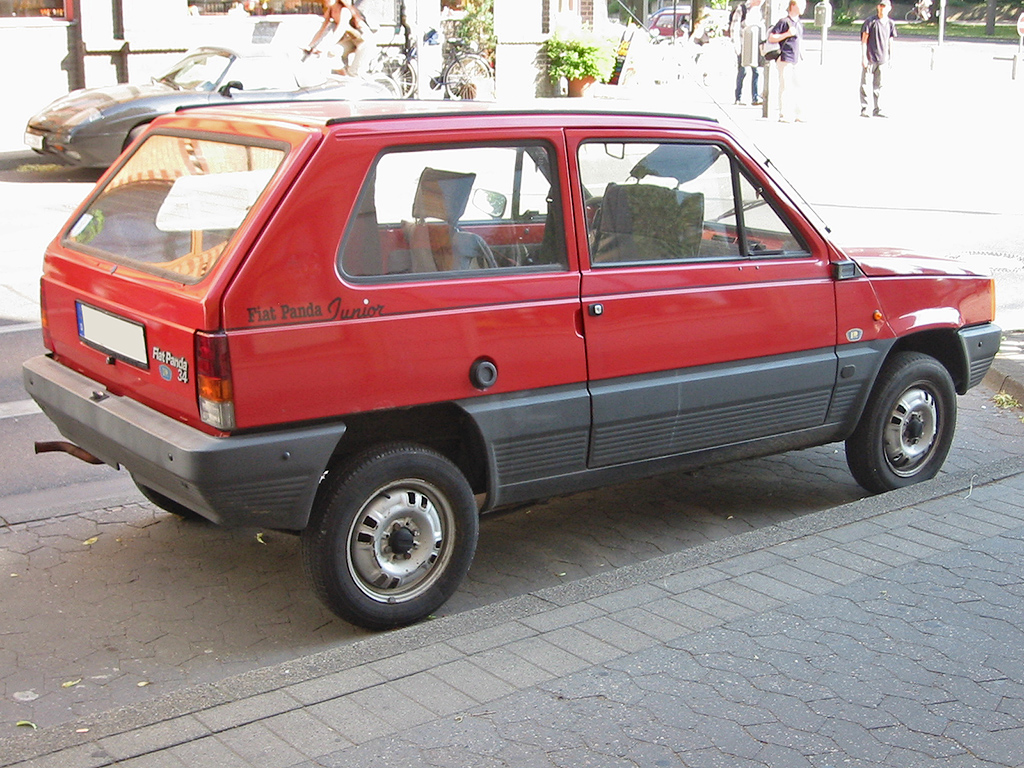
Rear view of original model

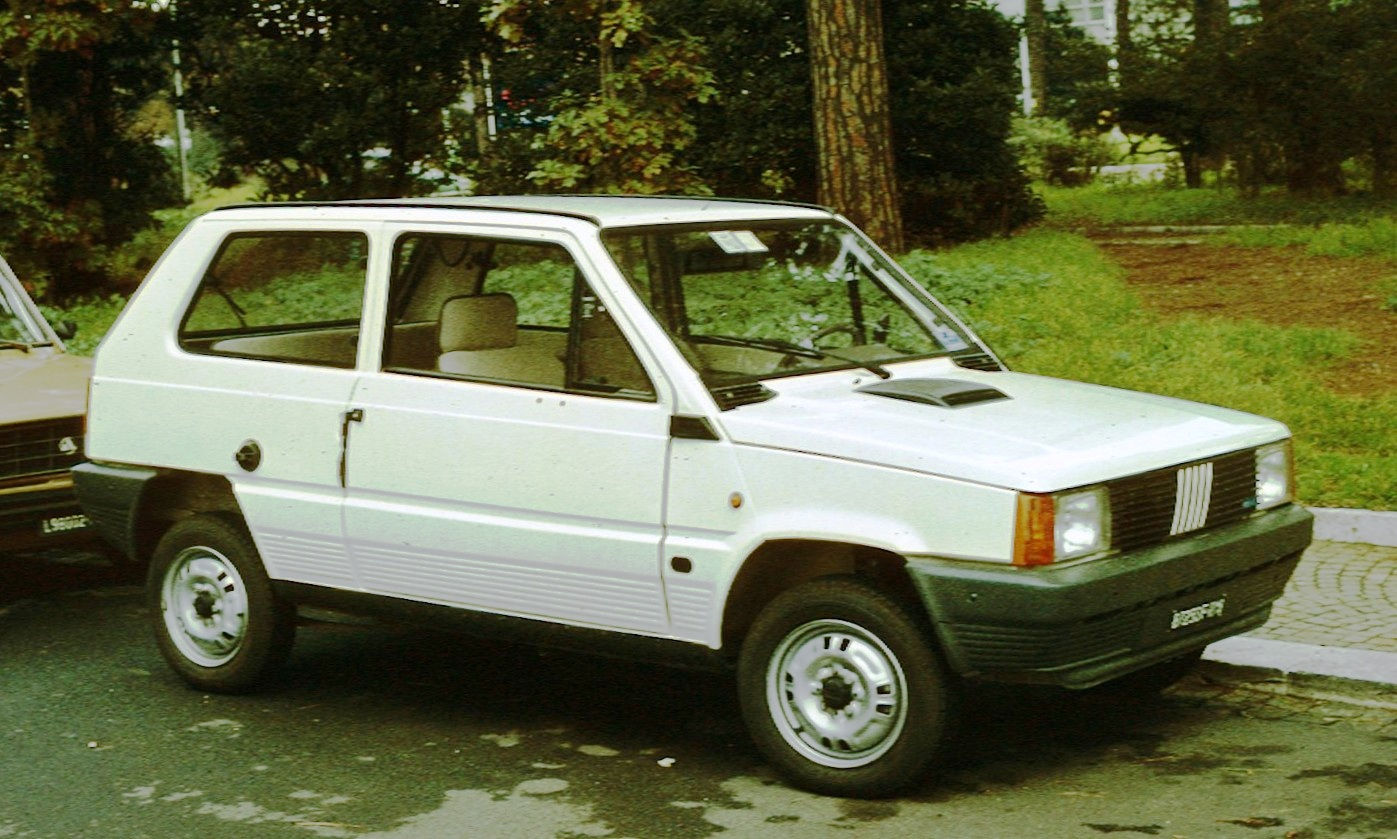
A Panda Super

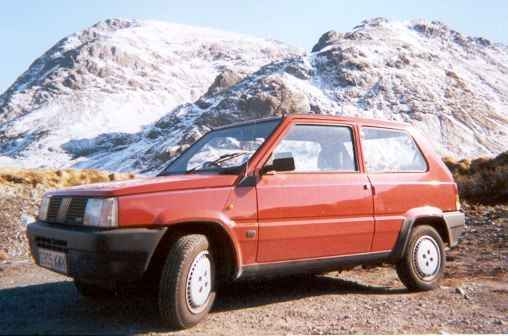
1986 facelift model

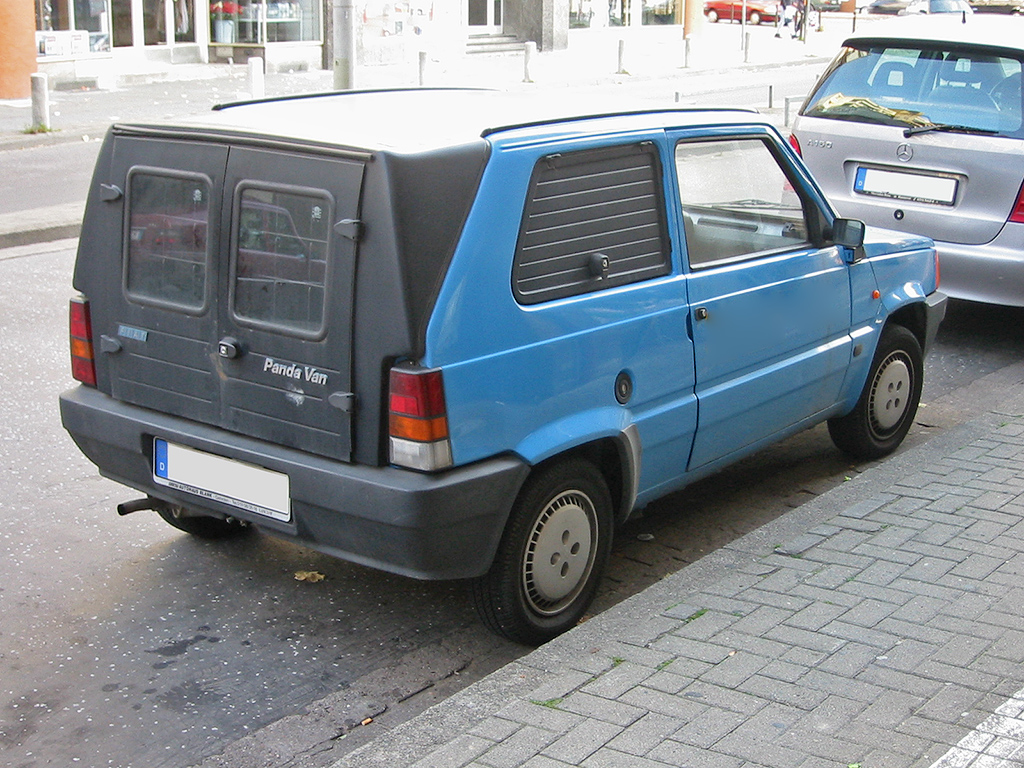
Fiat Panda Van

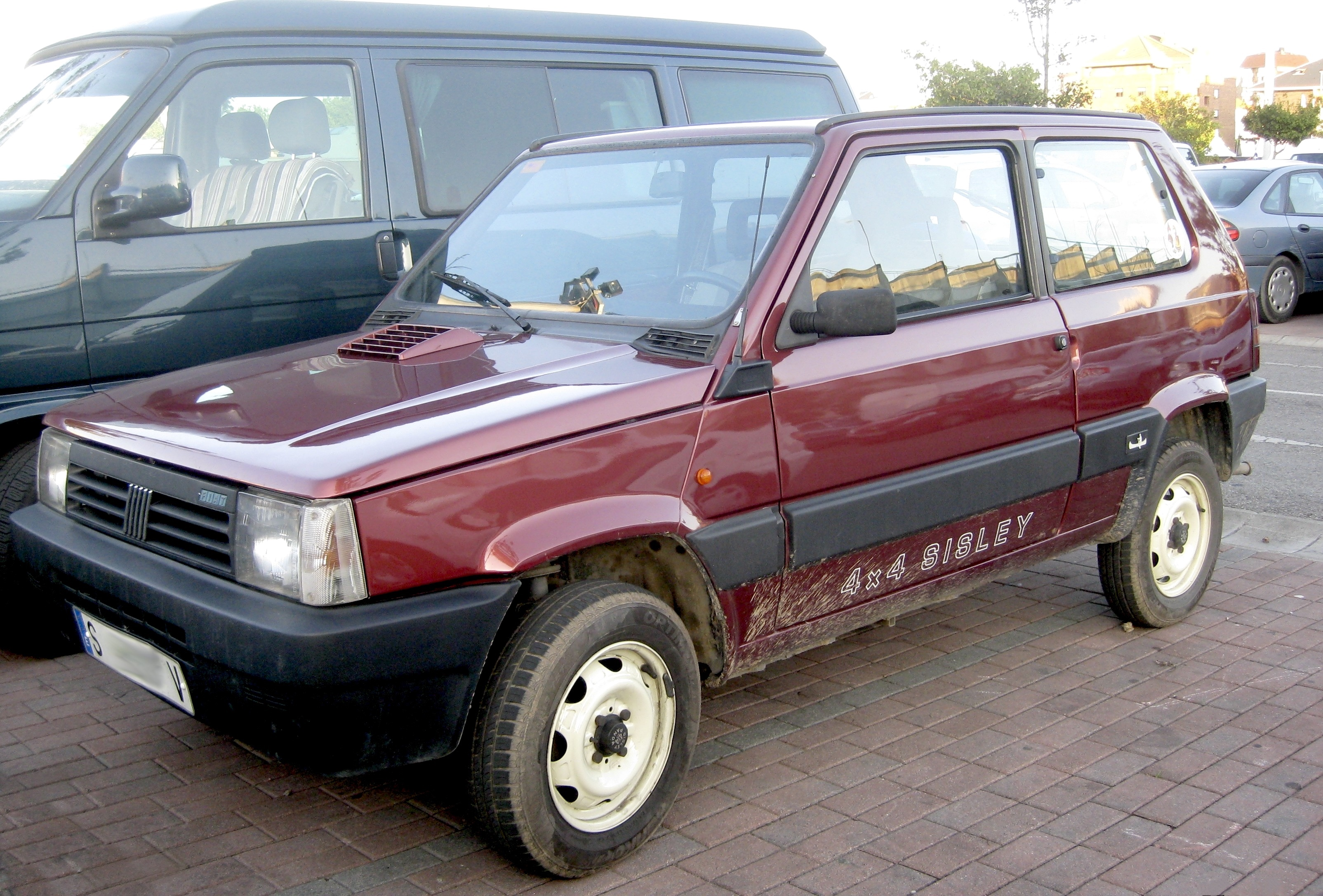
1989 Fiat Panda 4x4 Sisley

Fiat Panda Italia 90

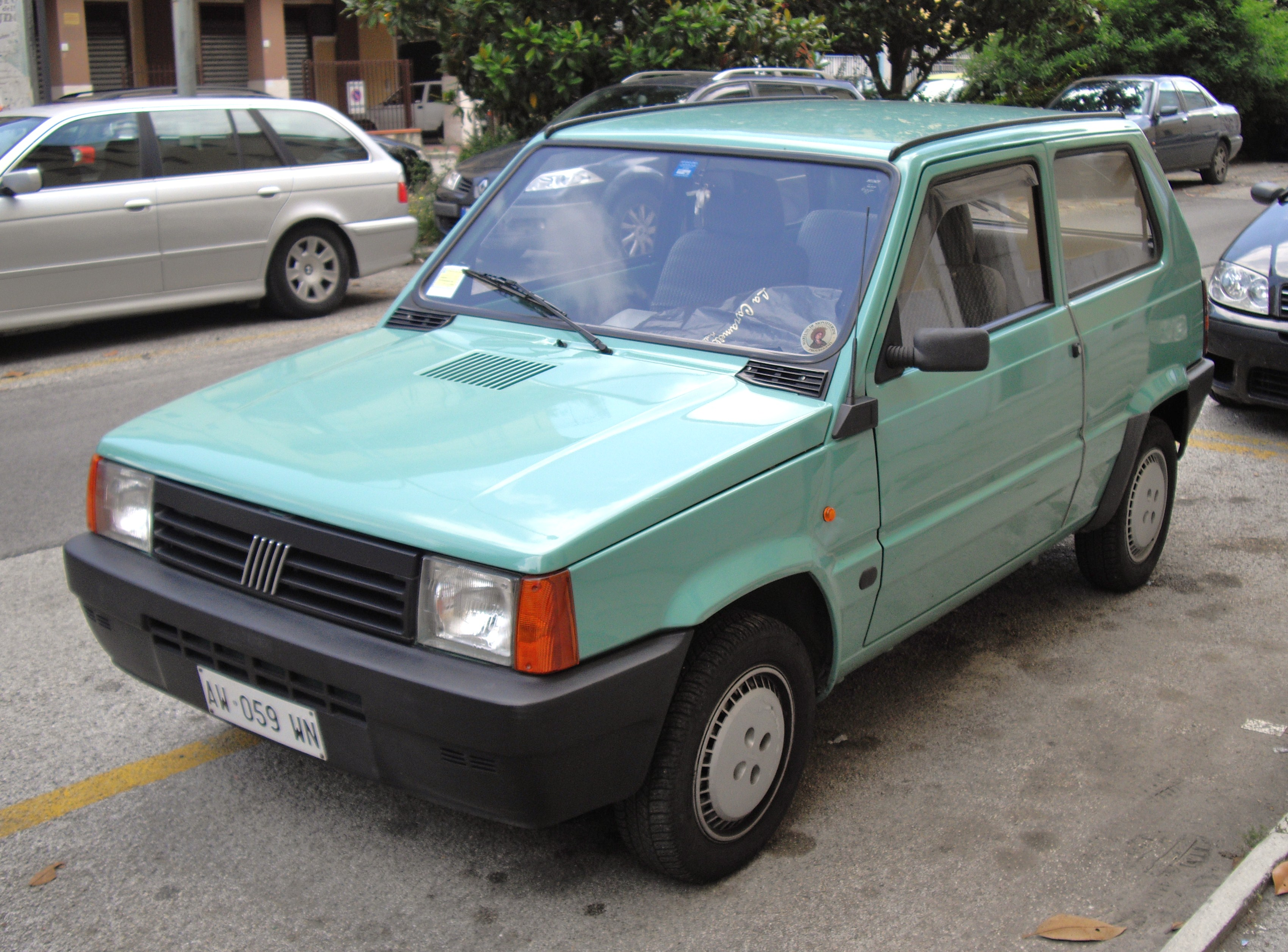
Second facelift of the first generation Panda

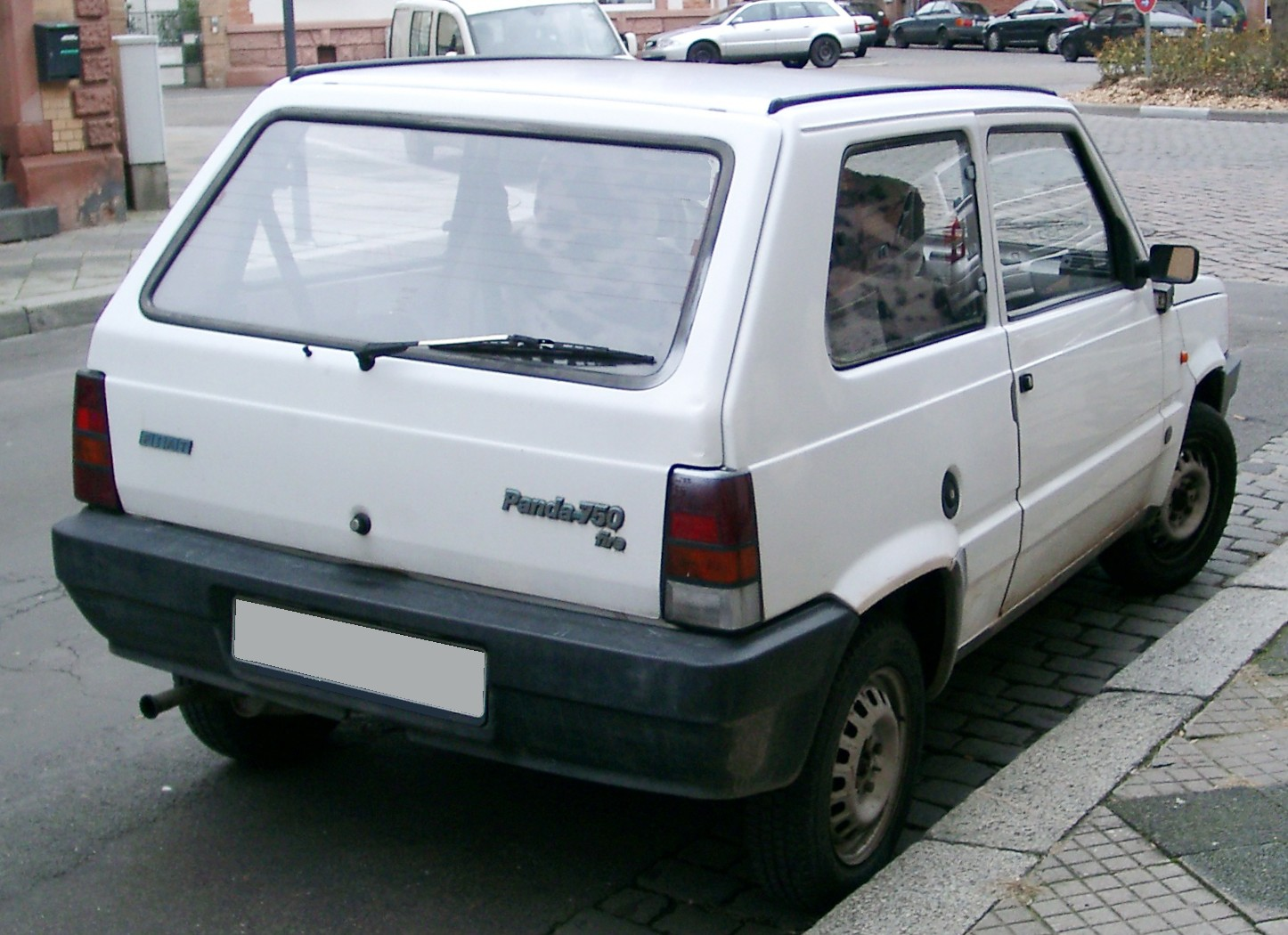
Second facelift of the first Panda; rear view

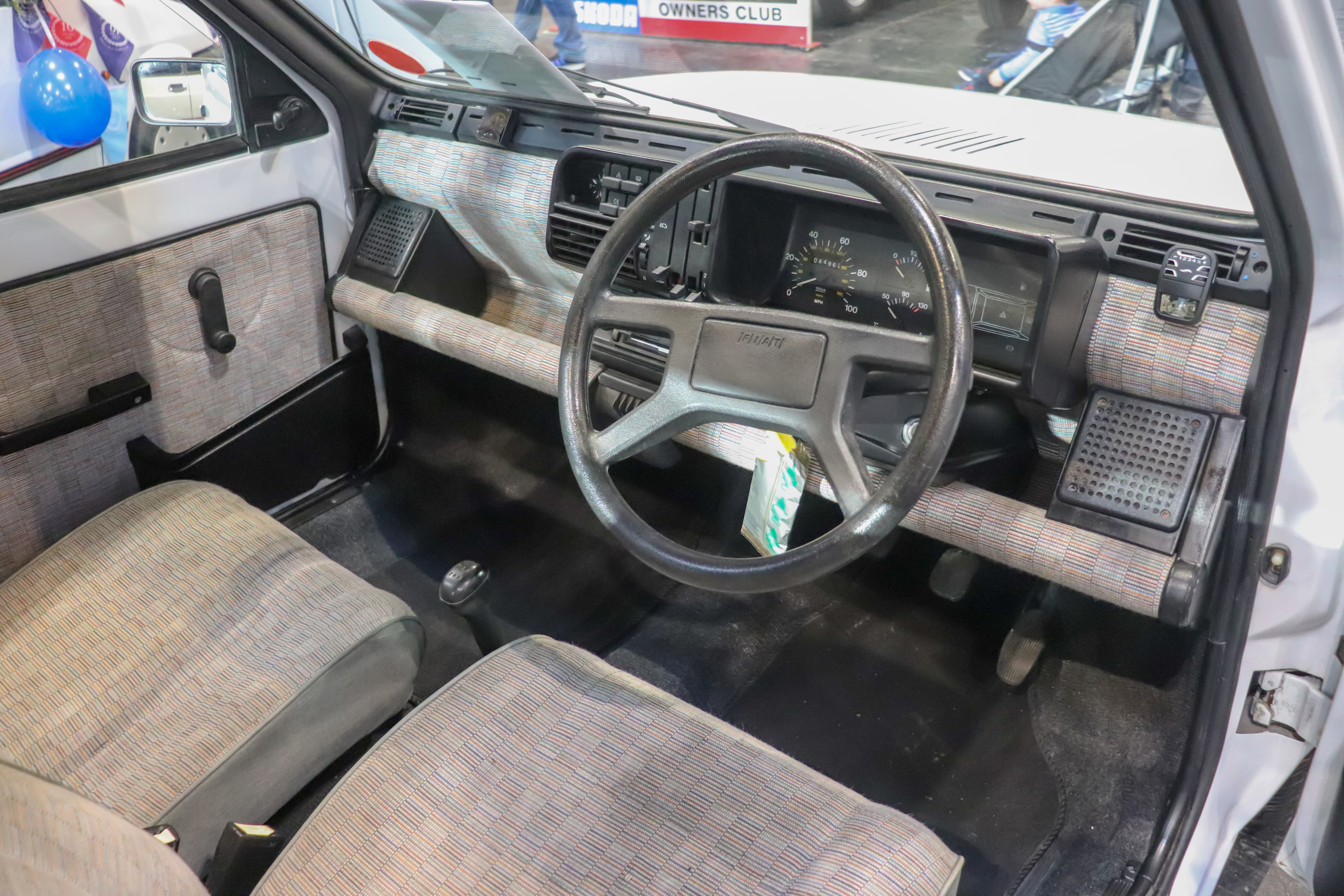
1991 Fiat Panda Super interior

=== First facelift (141a; 1986) ===
In January 1986, the Panda received a thorough revision with visual, mechanical and chassis changes, with the majority of parts being incompatible between the models. The facelift version was internally designated 141A.

The 652 cc air-cooled two-cylinder engine was replaced by a 769 cc (34 PS) water-cooled four-cylinder unit, and the 903/965cc by a 999 cc (45 PS, 50 PS [37 kW] in the 4x4) unit. Both new engines were from Fiat's new FIRE family of four-cylinder water-cooled powerplants with a single overhead camshaft. The rear suspension was also upgraded, the rigid axle with leaf springs being replaced by a more modern dependent suspension system known as the "Omega axle", consisting of a non-straight rigid axle with a central mounting and coil springs (first seen on the Lancia Y10, which used the same platform). The 4x4 retained the leaf-sprung live axle set-up. The body was strengthened and fully galvanised on later models, rear quarter panels received wheel arches mirroring the front fender/wing wheel arches. Front door quarter windows were eliminated. The range included 750L, 750CL, 750S, 1000CL, 1000S, 4x4 models.

April 1986 saw the introduction of a 1301 cc diesel engine with 37 PS (27 kW). This was a detuned version of the Brazilian engine also used in the 127/Uno. Fitted as standard with a five-speed gearbox it was only available in the basic "L" trim and was available until 1989 (until 1994 in the van versions).

A van variant of the Panda was introduced, with both petrol and diesel engines. The van eliminated rear seats and featured rear windows replaced with plastic blanking panels and a small, black, steel extension with side hinged doors in lieu of a hatch tailgate. Neither the van nor the diesel was available in right-hand-drive markets.

In 1987, an entry-level model badged "Panda Young" was added to the range. This was essentially an L spec car with a 769 cc OHV engine based on the old 903 cc push-rod Fiat 100 engine, producing the same 34 PS (25 kW; 34 hp) as the more sophisticated 769 cc FIRE unit. The Panda 4x4 Sisley limited edition was also released, based on the standard 4x4, with metallic paint, inclinometer, white painted wheels, roof rack, headlamp washers, bonnet scoop, and "Sisley" badging and trim. Although originally limited to the production of only 500, in 1989 the Sisley model became a permanent model.

==== Panda Italia 90 ====
Fiat was a major sponsor of the 1990 FIFA World Cup and the special edition "Italia 90" was sold in multiple European markets during the spring and summer of 1990. In the UK, it was based on a standard white 750 cc Panda L, and included unique graphics (a green and red pin stripe resembling the tricolour of the Italian flag and the "CIAO" logo on the rear quarter panels), a custom interior fabric (Azzurri blue fabric with "CIAO" logos stitched on the back panels - the Italian national football team wears blue), a tricolour shield motif on the grille and perhaps the most well known feature - the football hubcaps. However, some European markets got solid white hubcaps instead. In Italy and Germany, buyers were able to choose an Italia'90 based on a higher spec level which explains why some cars have rear windscreen wiper, later interiors with folding front seats, and the option of a full canvas sunroof. The Fiat Style Centre and Carrozzeria Maggiora also commissioned 40 convertible "service cars" for the Cup. The Agnelli family and Juventus gave one of these to each of the players who took part in the Nazionale, with the player's name on the side. Twelve of the open-topped cars were driven onto the pitch at the start of each match in each of the stadiums hosting the matches.

==== Panda Elettra ====
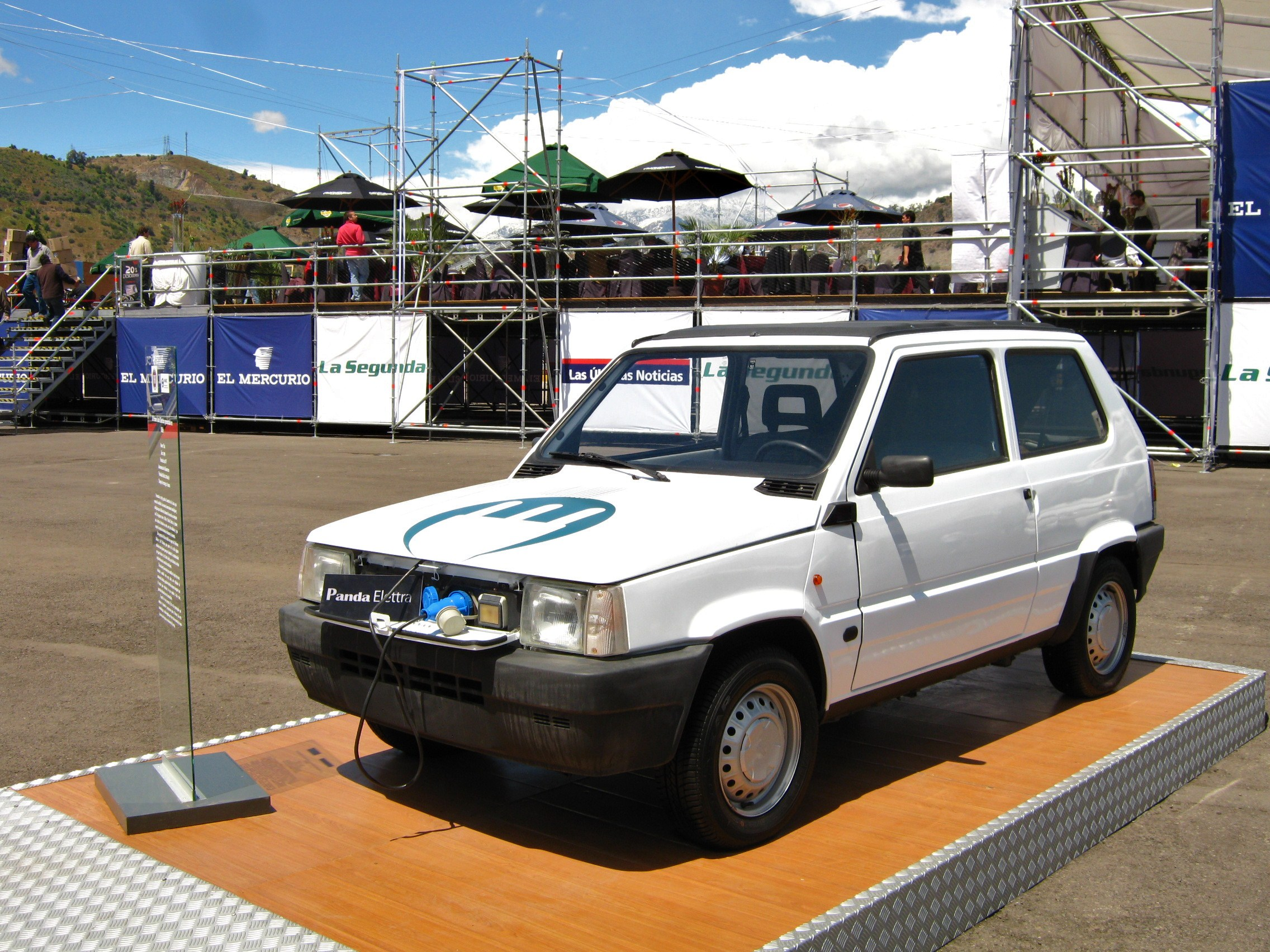
Panda Elettra in Santiago de Chile, 2010

The two-seat Panda Elettra, introduced in early 1990, added an all-electric power-train to the line. Batteries replaced the rear seats and occupied some of the engine bay where the 19 bhp (14 kW) DC motor was also fitted, driving through the normal clutch and gearbox, with weight increased to 1,150 kg (2,535 lb) (450 kg (992 lb) over than the standard model, necessitating stiffer suspension and uprated brakes. Range was limited, at 100 km (60 mi) at a steady 50 km/h (31 mph). In city driving, the range dropped to 70 km (43 mi). Top speed was a mere 65 km/h (40 mph). A full charge took 8 hours using a standard household outlet.

1992 revisions to the Elettra saw the power increased to 24 PS (18 kW) and the weight reduced, though the Elettra remained significantly heavier than the standard Panda. This, limited range and speed, and the steep price (25.600.000 lire in Italy, three times the price of the Panda 750 Young) made it a commercial failure. Nickel–cadmium batteries would have made the car lighter and improved performance and range, but would have increased the price even more. The Elettra was discontinued in 1998.

=== Second facelift (1991) ===
Revisions included a front grille with a smaller five-bar corporate badge, as well as revisions to trim and specifications across the range. New arrivals included the 'Selecta', which had a continuously variable transmission with an electromagnetic clutch. This transmission was available either with the normal 999 cc FIRE engine (revised with single-point fuel injection and a catalytic converter) or an all-new 1108 cc FIRE unit, fitted with electronic fuel injection and a three-way catalytic converter and producing 51 bhp (38 kW).

The new CLX trim also featured a five-speed gearbox as standard. The range now comprised the 750 Young (769 cc ohv), 750 and 750 CLX (both 769 cc FIRE sohc), 900 Dance (903 cc ohv), 1000 Shopping, CLX, CL Selecta and S (all with 999 cc sohc, available with or without SPI and catalytic converter depending on the market), 1100 CL Selecta (1108 cc sohc with SPI and cat) and the 4x4 Trekking (999 cc, again available with and without a cat depending on the market). The Elettra concluded the range.

In 1992, the 1108 cc engine, complete with SPI and catalytic converter, replaced the 999 cc unit in the 4x4 (with 50 bhp) and also in 1992 an 899 cc (with injection and catalyst) became available, in the 'Cafe' special edition. This was a reduced capacity 903 cc unit, designed to meet tax requirements in some markets. Non-catalyzed versions were withdrawn about this time.

In January 2001, the range underwent its final light adjustment. The 4x4 Trekking continued to be available, while front-wheel-drive versions were down to the Young and the Hobby. The 899 cc was discontinued and only the Euro 3 capable, fuel-injected 1108 cc FIRE unit remained available. These Pandas featured a body-coloured flap for the gas tank, rather than the exposed black plastic cap of earlier models.

==== End of production ====
The Panda was discontinued in the UK in 1995. The car remained in production in Italy until the final car was produced on 5 September 2003. Its total production run of 23 years makes the Fiat Panda one of Europe's longest-produced small cars.

=== SEAT Panda / Marbella ===
Spanish car maker SEAT also produced a version of the Panda between 1980 and 1986, based on the first Panda model. It was called SEAT Panda. SEAT also made a tiny, tall delivery version of the Panda called the SEAT Trans.

Up to 1983, SEAT made rebadged versions of Fiat cars through a licence agreement between the two firms. Thus, there existed a Spanish version of the Panda. When Pope John Paul II visited Spain in 1982, he rode in a specially built SEAT Panda.

After Fiat sold their share in SEAT and the licence agreement ended, the whole Fiat-based line of SEAT cars was quickly given minor facelifts. The SEAT Panda had its bonnet, bumpers, and rear tailgate redesigned. From 1986, when it received a second facelift, it was known as the SEAT Marbella until the end of production in 1998. Emelba also produced a roofless version called the Pandita, which was popular as a rental car in resort areas. The SEAT Trans also received a major facelift and was renamed, SEAT Terra.

As Fiat and SEAT's licensing agreement had expired in 1986 the Marbella never received the major mechanical upgrades of the facelifted Fiat Panda, instead continuing with the old pushrod Fiat-based engines, quarter light doors, un-galvanised frame, and leaf-sprung suspension as for the original model. It was popular in Spain throughout its production life but was less popular on export markets (where the Fiat version was the firm favourite) and by 1996, exports had mostly finished.

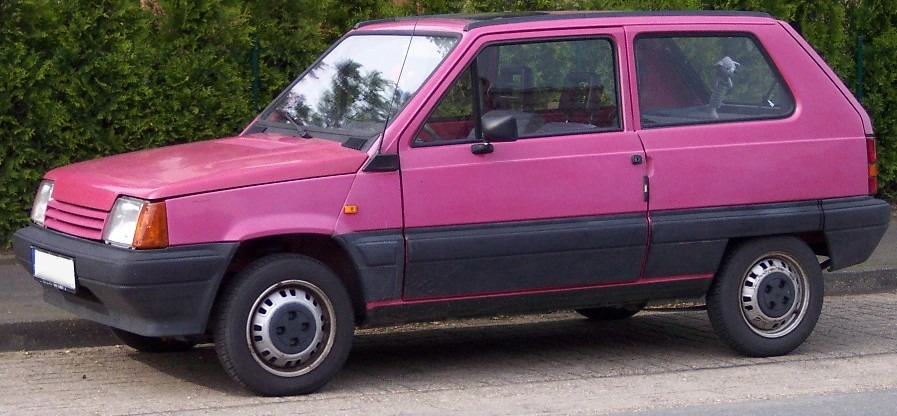
SEAT Marbella

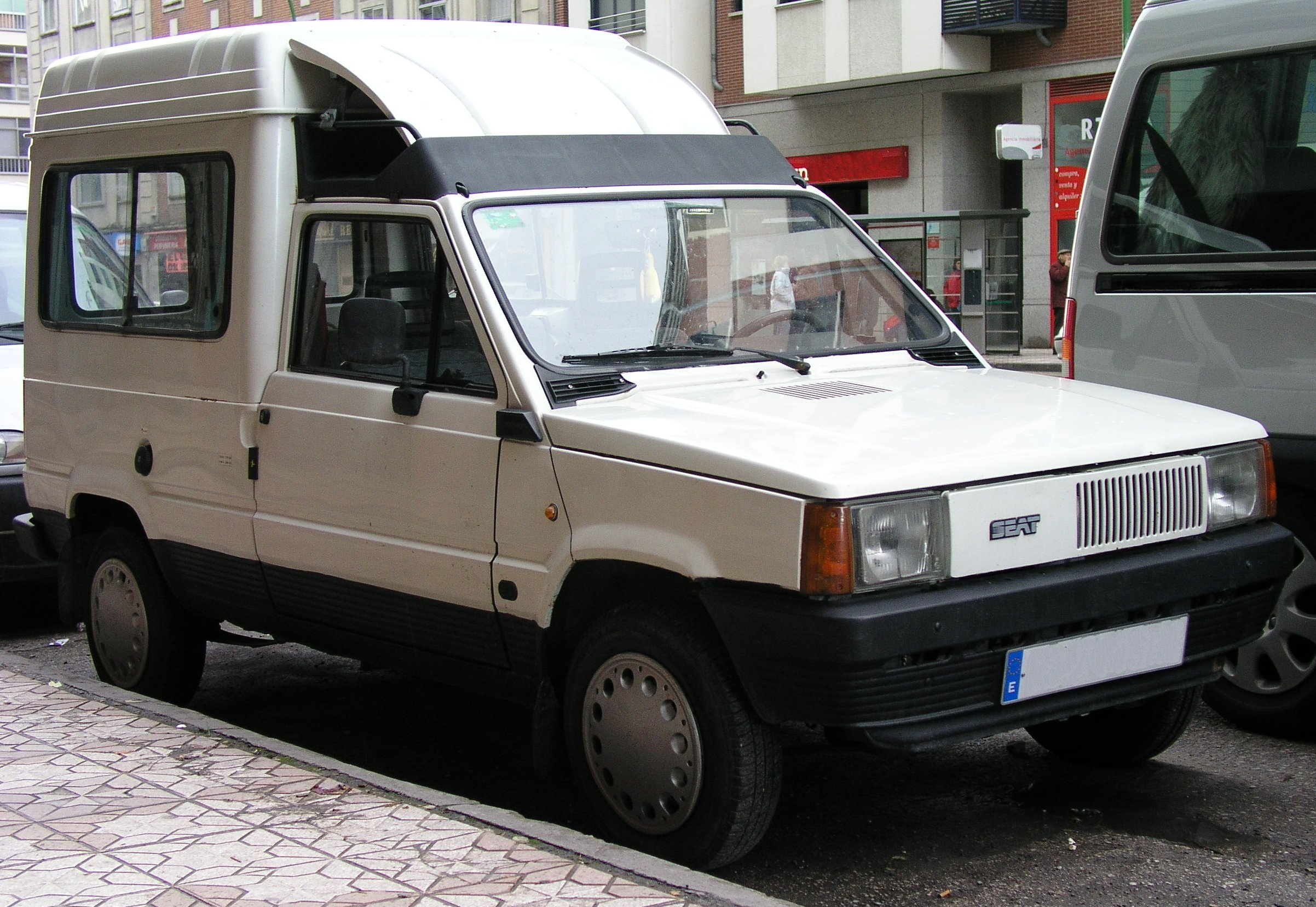
SEAT Trans

=== Reception and awards ===
The first generation Panda met with great success across Europe, polling 2nd in the 1981 European Car of the Year awards in its first full year of production (pipped to first place by the Ford Escort Mark III) and remaining on sale in some regions until May 2003.

In 1981 Giugiaro received the Italian Compasso d'Oro ADI industrial design award for the Panda. A less positive reaction to the design came from German magazine Der Spiegel, which in 1980 contrasted Giugiaro defining the Panda as "the most enchanting work of his life", and chief designer Felice Cornacchia describing himself as "proud overall of the car's architecture" to Peter Glodschey, road tester of mass-market Bild newspaper, who likened the car to "a shoe box". In several key markets the Panda's styling would continue to attract mixed reactions as the Uno followed in 1983 and the aggressively boxy look became the house style for Fiats throughout the 1980s.

== Second generation (2003) ==
Second generation
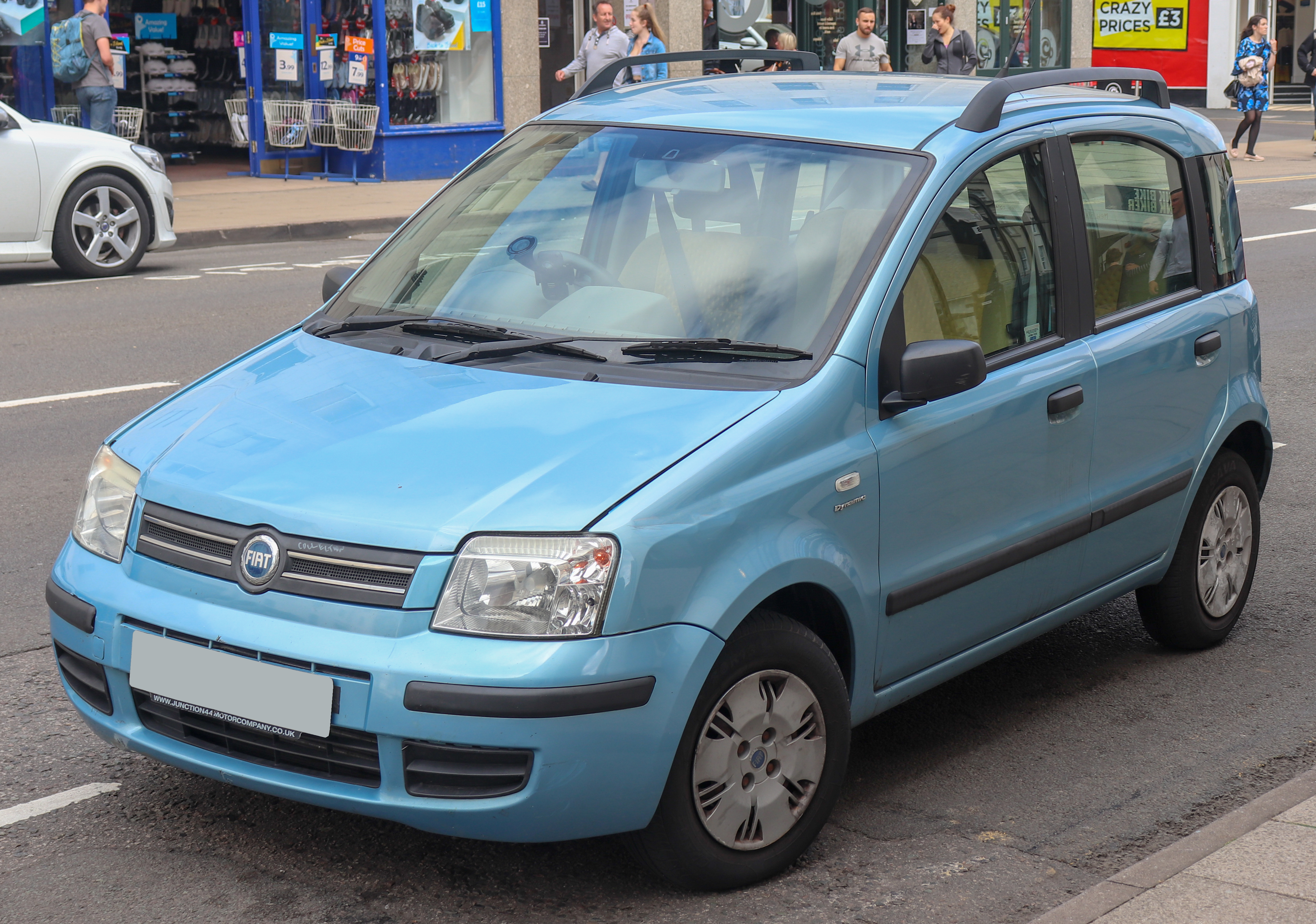
- 2004 Fiat Panda Dynamic (UK)

Overview
- Model code: 169
- Also called: Fiat Gingo (Pre-launch); Fiat Panda Classic (September 2011–December 2012)
- Production: May 2003 – December 2012 (2,168,491 units)
- Assembly: Poland: Tychy (Fiat Auto Poland)
- Designer: Giuliano Biasio at Bertone with Centro Stile Fiat

Body and chassis
- Body style: 5-door hatchback
- Layout: Front-engine, front-wheel-drive or four-wheel-drive
- Platform: Fiat Mini
- Related: Fiat 500; Ford Ka

Powertrain
- Engine: Petrol: 1.1 L Fire I4; 1.2 L Fire I4; 1.4 L Fire I4; Petrol/CNG: 1.2 L Fire I4; 1.4 L Fire I4; Diesel: 1.2 L Multijet I4
- Transmission: 5-speed manual 6-speed manual 5-speed automated manual

Dimensions
- Wheelbase: 2,299 mm (90.5 in); 2,305 mm (90.7 in) (4x4)
- Length: 3,538 mm (139.3 in)
- Width: 1,578 mm (62.1 in); 1,605 mm (63.2 in) (4x4); 1,606 mm (63.2 in) (100HP)
- Height: 1,578 mm (62.1 in)
- Curb weight: 840–975 kg (1,852–2,150 lb)

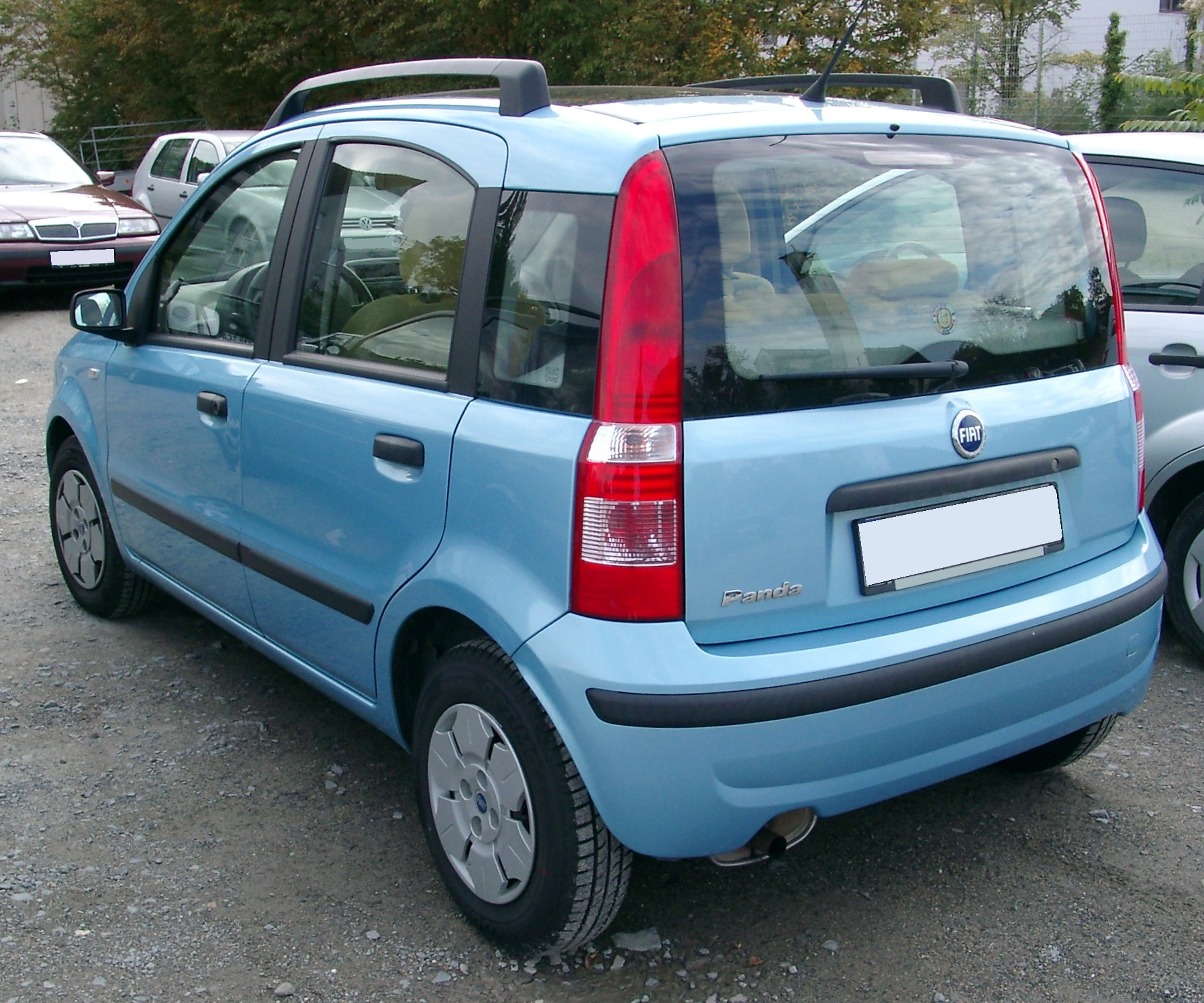
Fiat Panda rear

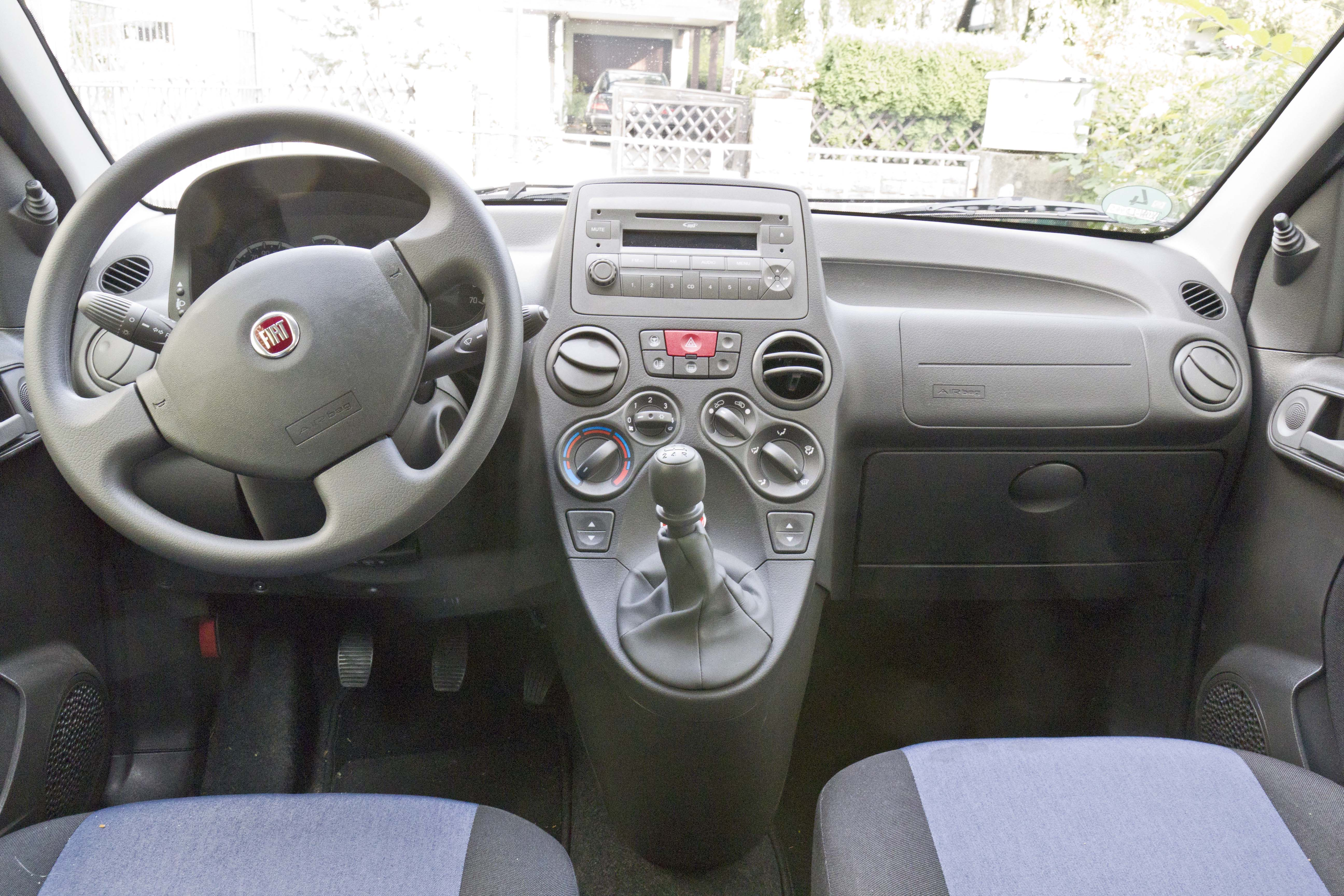
Interior

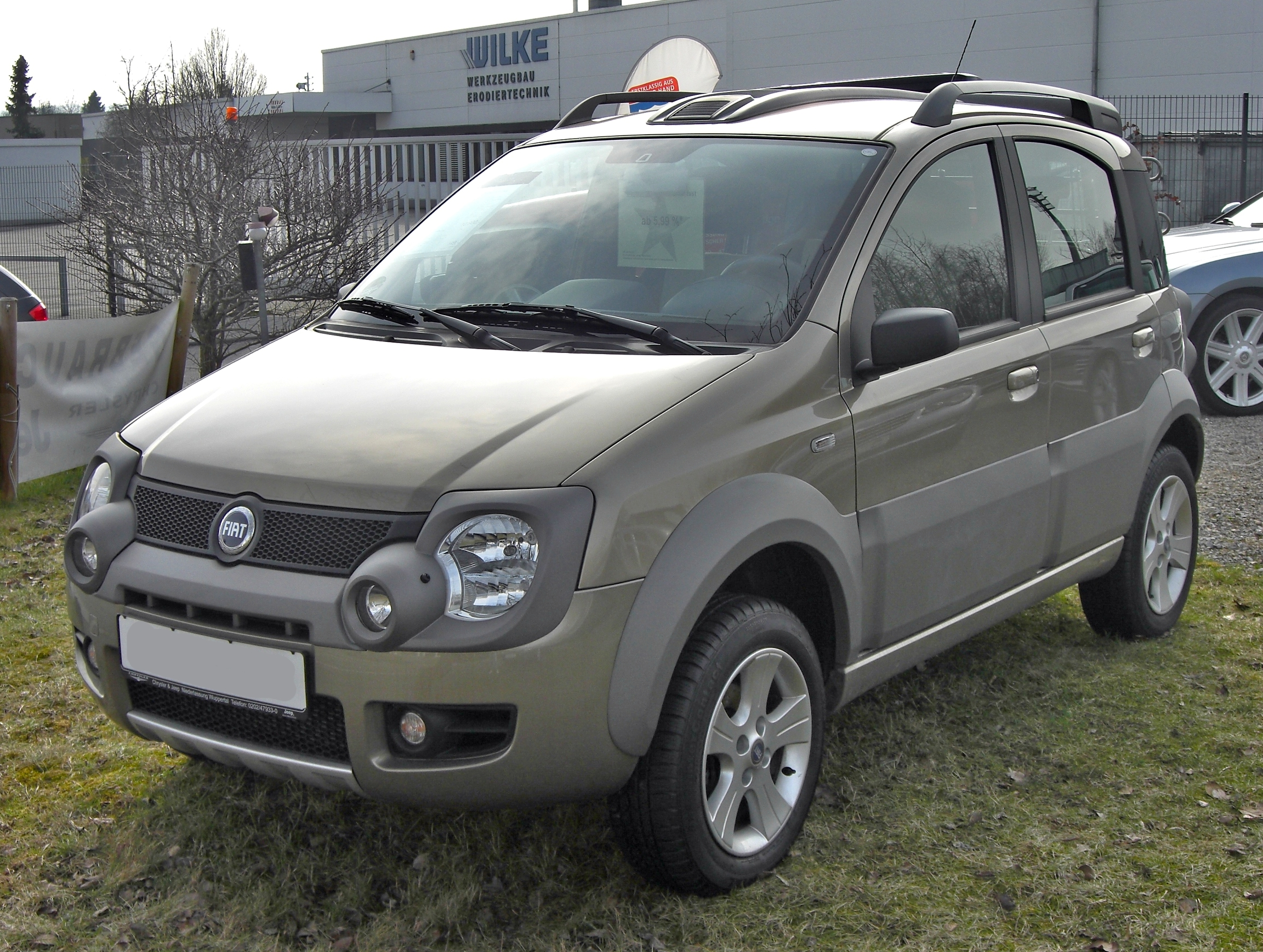
Fiat Panda Cross 4x4

The second generation Panda, codenamed Model 169, debuted in 2003, with almost no direct engineering linkage to the first generation. Until July 31, 2003, the vehicle name was meant to be Fiat Gingo. After a request from Renault because Gingo sounded too similar to the name of its own small car, the Twingo, Fiat eventually changed the name of its city car. In 2004, the new Panda was awarded the Compasso d'Oro industrial design award. Production model development was entrusted to I.DE.A Institute.

Like the smaller Fiat Seicento, the Panda was manufactured only in Tychy, Poland, by Fiat Auto Poland. The high-bodied Panda takes styling cues from mini MPVs and mini SUVs, especially the second generation Fiat Multipla. The Panda won the European Car of the Year award in 2004.

The Panda includes an option for split rear seats, which makes the Panda a four-seater. Since September 2005, all Pandas are equipped with ABS, EBD and at least one front airbag. The gear-lever is located high on the central dashboard, which is designed to make changing gears more comfortable than with a conventional floor-mounted gearstick.

Financially troubled Fiat needed the new Panda to be a success, and it sold half a million units by October 2005. It sells particularly well in Italy (over half of the cars produced are sold in Italy), being seen as closer to a spiritual successor to the Fiat 500 than a replacement for either the Seicento or the old Panda.

- The 500,000th new Panda was built on 5 October 2005, a light blue Panda Emotion with the 1.3-litre diesel engine.
- The 1,000,000th new Panda was built on 5 September 2007, a red Panda 4x4 Climbing with 1.2-litre petrol engine.
- The 1,500,000th new Panda was built on 21 July 2009, a blue Panda Emotion with 1.3-litre diesel engine.
- The 2,000,000th new Panda rolled out of factory on 4 July 2011, a red Panda 4x4 Cross with 1.3-litre 75 bhp Multijet diesel engine.

Top Gear Motoring Survey in 2006 ranked the Panda 8th out of 152 cars surveyed for reliability, craftsmanship, ownership costs, driving experience and service received. (One of the show's hosts, James May, went on to purchase one).

=== Official usage ===
The Panda is produced for police departments (the Polish police have bought some blue and white Panda Actual models), military agencies (the Italian Army uses several dark green Panda Climbing models), forest services (the Italian forest service has dark green Panda Climbing models), and mail delivery services (the yellow Swiss Post model even comes in a popular toy car format readily available in grocery stores).

=== Safety (2004) ===
Tested model: 2004 Fiat Panda 1.2.

Euro NCAP test results* Fiat Panda 1.2 (2004)
Test	Score	Rating
Adult occupant:	20	3 /5 stars
Child occupant:	21	2 /5 stars
Pedestrian:	6	1 /4 stars

=== 2005 revisions ===
In September 2005 several changes were made to the Panda, including standard fitment of ABS and a front passenger's airbag.

=== 2007 revisions ===
The Panda range received minor updates in March 2007, including a new, darker dashboard. The Active model also received new darker seat fabrics of better quality and the addition of a CD player as standard. The new dark red Fiat badge replaced the blue roundel on the Panda in Summer 2007.

=== 2009 revisions ===
The Panda range was mildly rearranged again in 2009, with the addition of Active Eco and Dynamic Eco models. These models feature revised 1.1 and 1.2 petrol engines respectively, with better fuel economy and CO_{2} emissions. Both models also qualify for £30 annual road road tax in the UK, and replace the original standard engines. Dynamic Aircon and SkyDome models were also dropped in favour of simplifying the Panda range.

On 4 July 2011, Fiat announced that the 2,000,000th Panda had rolled off of their Tychy, Poland assembly line. The milestone car was a Panda Cross finished in Rosso Sfrontato and equipped with the 75 hp 1.3 L Multijet four-cylinder diesel. Fiat did not say which country it was headed to.

=== Panda Classic ===
The Panda Classic was a second series Fiat Panda renamed and with a reduced list price to distinguish it from the new generation introduced in late 2011. The engine range comprised the 1.2 Fire petrol, 1.2 Fire EasyPower (petrol and LPG), 1.4 Fire Natural Power (petrol and CNG) and 1.3 Multijet diesel. The 4x4 was offered with 1.2 petrol and 1.3 Multijet diesel. The Panda Cross was no longer manufactured. The Panda Classic was produced through 2012.

=== Models ===
- The Natural Power is a dual-fuel version, it can burn either gasoline or CNG (Compressed Natural Gas a.k.a. methane). Methane results in low emissions and increased fuel economy. The chassis is the same of the 4x4, the space of the rear wheels differential is occupied by two methane tanks allowing over 240 km of autonomy on gas only.
- The basic Actual has black bumpers, lacks electric windows and a full-size spare wheel. The Actual was introduced in January 2004.
- The Active, introduced in May 2003, features black self-coloured bumpers and front electric windows, central door locking, radio/cassette player, driver's airbag, power steering. Manual climate control is available as an option. Since September 2005, ABS and the front passenger's airbag have been made standard. This model has the 1100 cc "FIRE" engine and a five-speed gearbox.
- The Active Plus edition is an up-equipped Active, with a cassette/CD player as standard. Production of the Active Plus stopped in December 2003.
- The Dynamic edition features ABS, dual airbags, roof bars, power steering and a cassette player as standard. A CD & MP3 player, CD changer, alloy wheels, manual or automated climate control, glass sunroof, and an automated manual transmission are available as options. Since September 2005, four airbags have been standard in some countries, with an option for two additional side curtain airbags.
- The Emotion (Eleganza) edition is the highest trim level. This particular trim level features significant enhancements over the Dynamic, with a standard CD player, alloy wheels with low profile tires and automated climate control. In some countries such as the UK, the Emotion is sold as the "Eleganza".
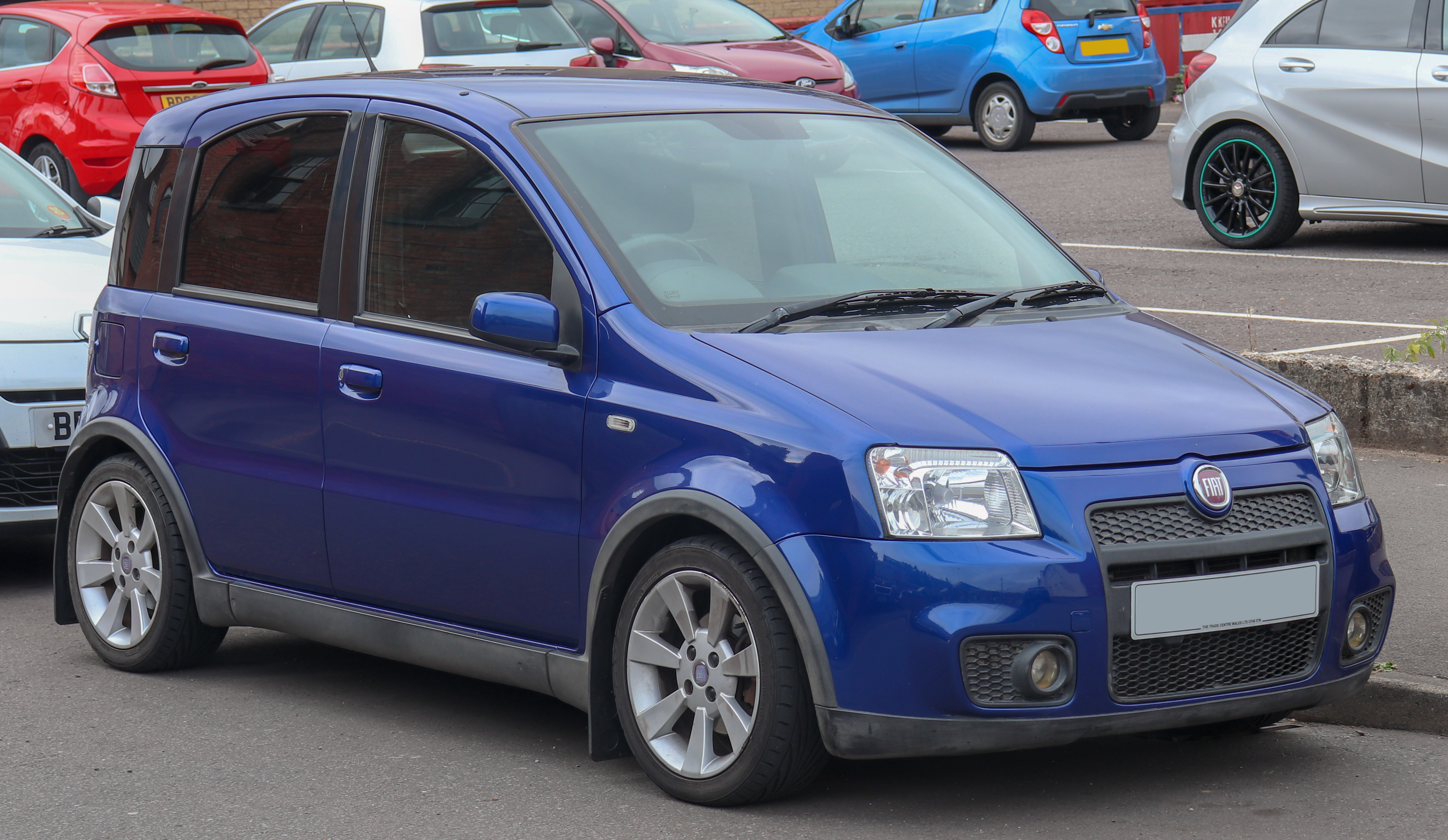

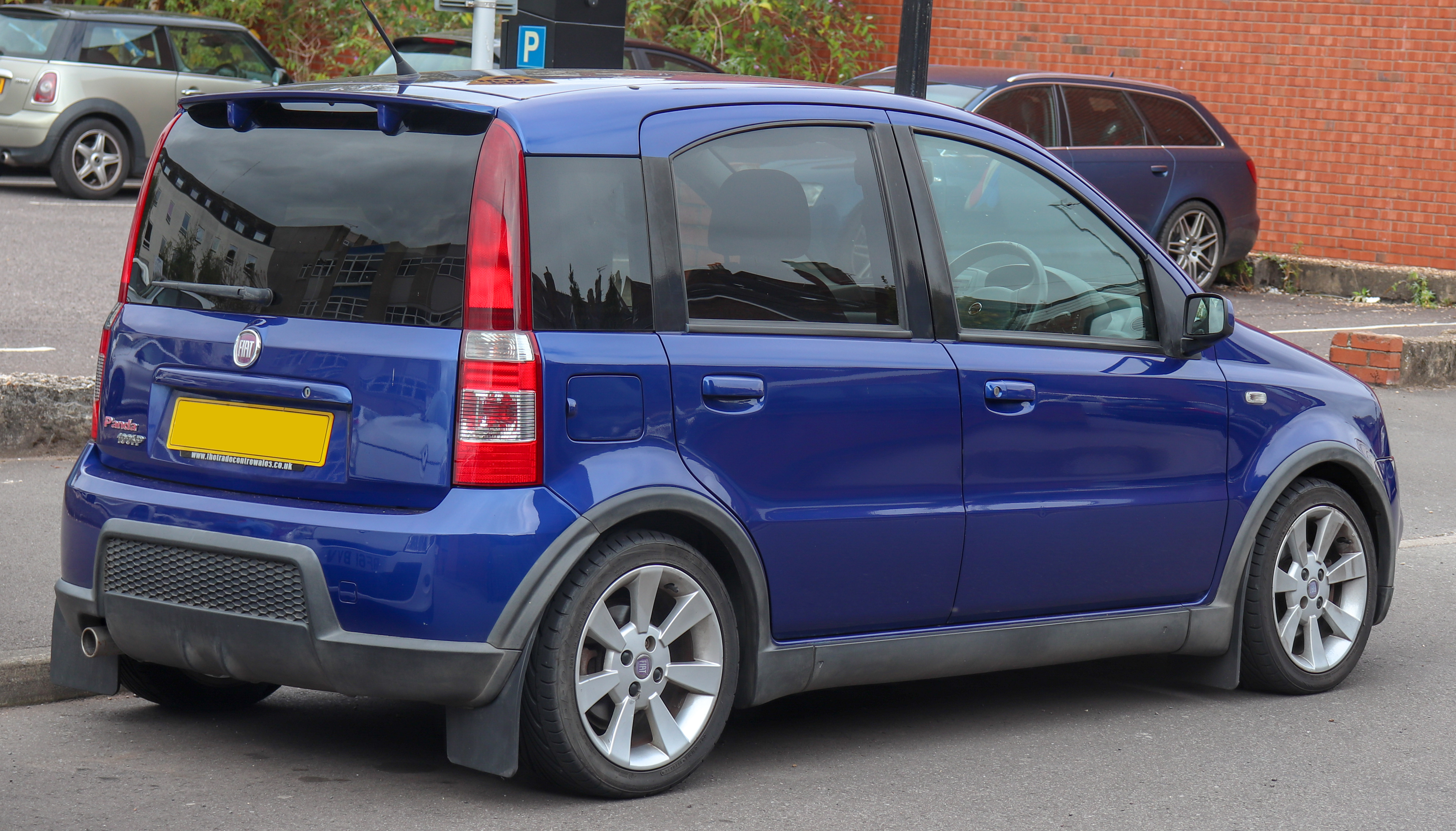
Fiat Panda 100HP

- The 100 HP edition is the sportiest Panda model. It has the 1.4-litre 16-valve FIRE petrol from the Fiat Punto tuned to develop 100 PS (74 kW; 99 bhp) through a six-speed manual transmission. It differs from other Pandas by being equipped with 4-wheel disc brakes, tinted windows, and sports styled front and rear bumpers. The Panda 100 HP features a unique suspension setup with modified springs, dampers, bushes and compliance giving a considerably firmer ride.

The Panda 100 hp offers 0–100 km/h acceleration in 9.5 s and a maximum speed of 185 km/h (115 mph), with fuel consumption at 6.5 L/100 km (43.5 mpg_{‑imp}; 36.2 mpg_{‑US}) in the EU combined cycle and 154 g/km of CO_{2} emissions. It was available in black, white, red, metallic blue, and metallic gray while a "Pandamonium Pack" which added red disc brakes, decals and colour-coded wing mirrors was an optional extra.

The Panda 100 hp was introduced in 2006, but due to tightening emissions regulations, Fiat halted its production in July 2010.

- The 4x4 Climbing edition, introduced in December 2004, has a higher ride height and larger wheels and tires than other editions. The four-wheel drive system also makes this edition slower than others. Features are similar to those found in the Dynamic. The Climbing, however, lacks a differential lock and transmission with reductor. The Climbing edition can be distinguished by a slightly higher suspension, additional black plastic overlays on the bumpers and a "Climbing" badge just below the "Panda" badge on the left side of the rear licence plate. Swedish magazine Vi Bilägare found in a test 2007 that Panda 4x4 is a good and economical choice for a small family who need a car with four-wheel drive.
- The Cross edition, similar to the Climbing, features differently shaped front and rear lights and additional side cladding. Unlike the Climbing, the Cross does have a differential lock. The Cross edition became available in January 2006 in Italy and was also available in other markets including right-hand drive.

The Actual and Active are also bases for the Actual Van and Active Van, which can be used as small vans (they also have an additional safety net behind the front seats and removable rear seats). These versions can be identified by small "Van" label on the back door.

During the time, many limited editions of Panda (Active and Dynamic editions only) were produced. Each of them had additional interior fittings, differentiating them from the base model.

=== Prototypes and special editions ===
- The 360 Special Series

Based on the 1.2 L Dynamic, the 360 Special Series is distinguished by a black and white crosshair style logo on the B pillar. Other upgraded features include; 14 inch alloy wheels, metallic paint, special interior trim (including the Fiat brand on the front seats), built in bluetooth phone system, CD player, air conditioning and a split folding rear seat. Other more standard features include; electric windows, central locking system and dual speed power steering. The total of all these extras comes somewhere in the region of £1,600 but surprisingly the upgraded 360 model actually retails at roughly £400 less than the Dynamic model. On the safety side of things, it comes with anti lock brakes and brake assist as well as two airbags as standard (driver and passenger) with the option of adding an extra four airbags taking the total up to six.

- Fiat Panda Alessi

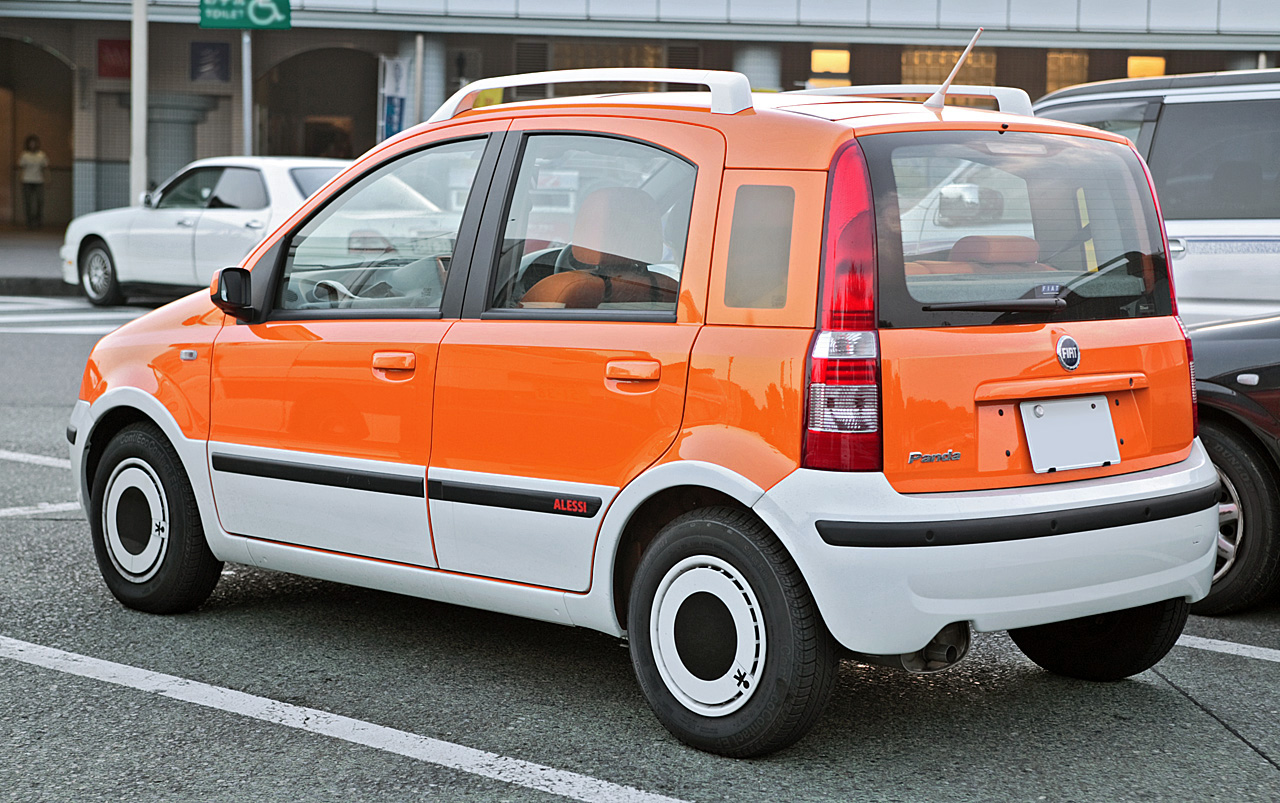
Fiat Panda Alessi

Italian design house Alessi created a special edition featuring a two-tone paint scheme and unique trim inside and out. Fiat gave away some of Alessi's products (coffee machine and tin-can openers) for the special model's debut at the Ideal Home Show in the UK. The rims feature the Girotondo family accents.

- Fiat Panda Jolly

The Fiat Panda Jolly was created by Fiat Styling Center and Stola and inspired by boat design. It served as a special shuttle bus in Capri during the summer of 2006. The interior features innovative materials and exclusive trims. The concept mainly came from the 600 Multipla Jolly, a car created by Carrozzeria Ghia in 1956, which could be found on the streets of Capri 50 years ago. Defined by Fiat as "a car with a fresh, light and Mediterranean look both in the colors and materials", the Panda Jolly is inspired by the interior design and yacht design worlds, and features styling elements that remind of the spirit and way of life of the 1960s.

The interiors are created by Paola Lenti, an Italian leading company in the Interior Design sector, specialized in the research and development of innovative fabrics and materials. All the seats are upholstered in the exclusive sailing-inspired Rope fabric. This material is nonallergic, nontoxic, antibacterial and resistant to UV rays. Many structural elements like the floor, sills and various trims are made with pickled natural ash finish with white ash inlays.

- Fiat Panda Terramare 4

Panda Terramare's creator is Milan born Maurizio Zanisi, an independent former Iso Rivolta engineer, and his self-built amphibian is based on a Panda 4x4 chassis, but with an inflatable flotation belt, and waterjet propulsion driven off the rear axle.

On 21 July 2006, the Terramare crossed the English Channel from Folkestone in Kent to Cap Gris Nez in just over 6 hours.

- Fiat Panda Luxury

At the 'Luxury & Yachts' show in February 2006, Fiat exhibited a one-off car based on the 4x4 called the 'Luxury'. The outside of the car features dipped silver paintwork, precious metal trim and gleaming jewel-like mouldings with back-lit inset crystals. The interior features dipped silver appointments, precious metal details, Jewel Alcantara upholstery and leather with mother of pearl finish. The Fiat logo is also worked on the seats with stylish studs and crystals.

- Fiat Panda Hydrogen

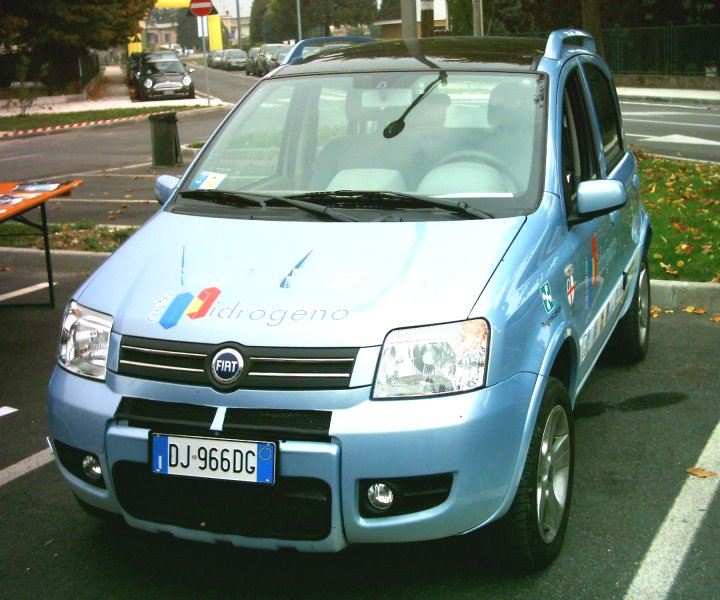
Fiat Panda Hydrogen

The Panda Hydrogen, a prototype driven by a hydrogen Fuel Cell, was a joint venture between Fiat Auto, the Fiat Research Centre and Fiat Powertrain Research & Technology with the support of the Research and Environment Ministries.

On the Panda Hydrogen, the Fuel Cell System is housed beneath the floorpan. The fuel cells are made up of several cells connected in series. Inside, the hydrogen and oxygen molecules are forced to react with the aid of a catalyst to produce water and heat. Electrical energy is generated with very high efficiency and zero emissions from the vehicle itself.

At full power, the Fuel Cell engine on the Panda Hydrogen delivers 60 kW (82 PS; 80 hp) that allows the car to reach a top speed of more than 130 km/h (81 mph), with acceleration from 0 to 50 km/h (31 mph) in 5 seconds. The car can also easily climb a gradient of 23% at take-off.

During 2006 a demonstration stage of small Panda Hydrogen fleets, was a forerunner to other demonstration programs promoted and supported by the European Union and by the Italian Ministries and Regions. The aim is for such vehicles to be marketed within 15 to 20 years.

- Fiat Panda Tanker

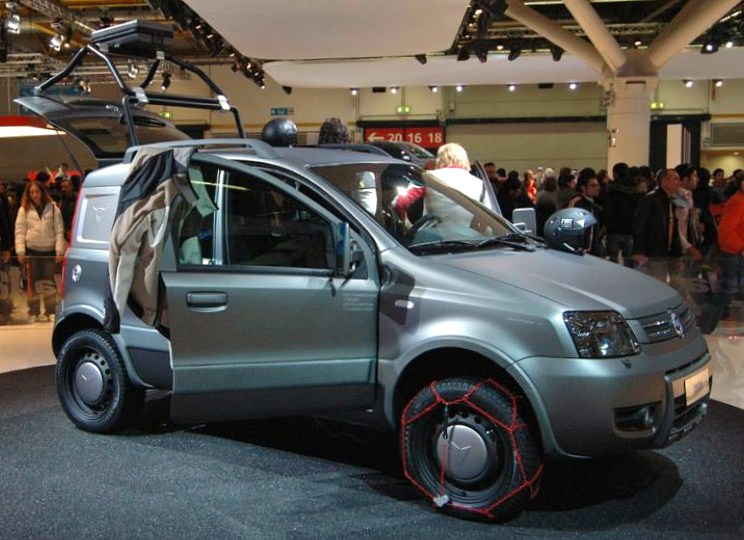
Fiat Panda Tanker Concept

Unveiled at the Bologna Motor Show in Italy, the Panda Tanker features only three doors. And although the overall shape has remained unchanged, the two rear doors have been replaced by solid panels to free up some extra load space in the practical cabin. Rugged extras and underbody protection also help to set the Tanker apart from the standard Panda 4x4 model. Designed in conjunction with Italian extreme sport clothing manufacturer Dainese, the show star is equipped with sports seats incorporating a rigid titanium fibre shell.

Reflecting the matt paint finish of the exterior, the cabin has a back-to-basics feel. With no rear seats, the load floor offers flexible attachments for fixing sports kit, while an aluminium structure is designed to carry mountain bikes.

- Fiat Panda MultiEco

The Panda MultiEco show-car made its world debut in Geneva 2006. Fiat sees this unit as the future of cars with a low environmental impact: the concept car represents the most advanced frontier achievable in terms of emissions and consumption, combining technologies that already exist or are ready for production.

The show-car combines new 'powertrain' architecture (with an engine of dual petrol/methane fuel supply, MTA transmission and BAS device) with the use of eco-compatible materials (recycled, recyclable or of natural origin) for the exterior and interior. It introduces optimised aerodynamics and a significant weight reduction.

Panda MultiEco is equipped with a dual-fuel (methane and petrol) FIRE engine – future developments will also make it possible to use a methane/hydrogen mix – combined with a BAS (Belt-driven Alternator-Starter) device and a Dualogic robotised gearbox.

- Fiat PanDAKAR

Two factory-built Fiat Panda 4x4s were prepared to contest the gruelling Dakar 2007 rally raid, which started in Lisbon.

Entered in the T2 category, the class which most closely represents production vehicles, the two Panda 4x4s, driven by Miki Biasion and former Dakar winner, Bruno Saby, respectively, are powered by Fiat Auto's 1.3-litre Multijet turbodiesel combined with a six-speed manual gearbox. The engines deliver 105 bhp (78 kW) at 4,500 rpm and a peak torque of 123 lb⋅ft (166.8 N⋅m). at 2,500 rpm. Apart from their small dimensions, the two cars are particularly noteworthy for their automatic all-wheel drive system with viscous coupling and locking differential, a system that provides more grip and traction on rough and soft terrain thanks to the optimal split of drive to the wheels.

The two Pandas competing in Dakar 2007 have been equipped specifically for this rally: so room has been found inside for accessories like aluminium platforms to help extricate the vehicles from soft sand, shovels, spare wheels, water reserves for the crew, and other specialised equipment useful for the occasion. The Fiat expedition to Dakar included a Fiat Sedici as service back-up, and three Iveco trucks to transport spares and technicians.

Both PanDAKAR retired on the fourth stage of the event.

- Fiat Panda Simba

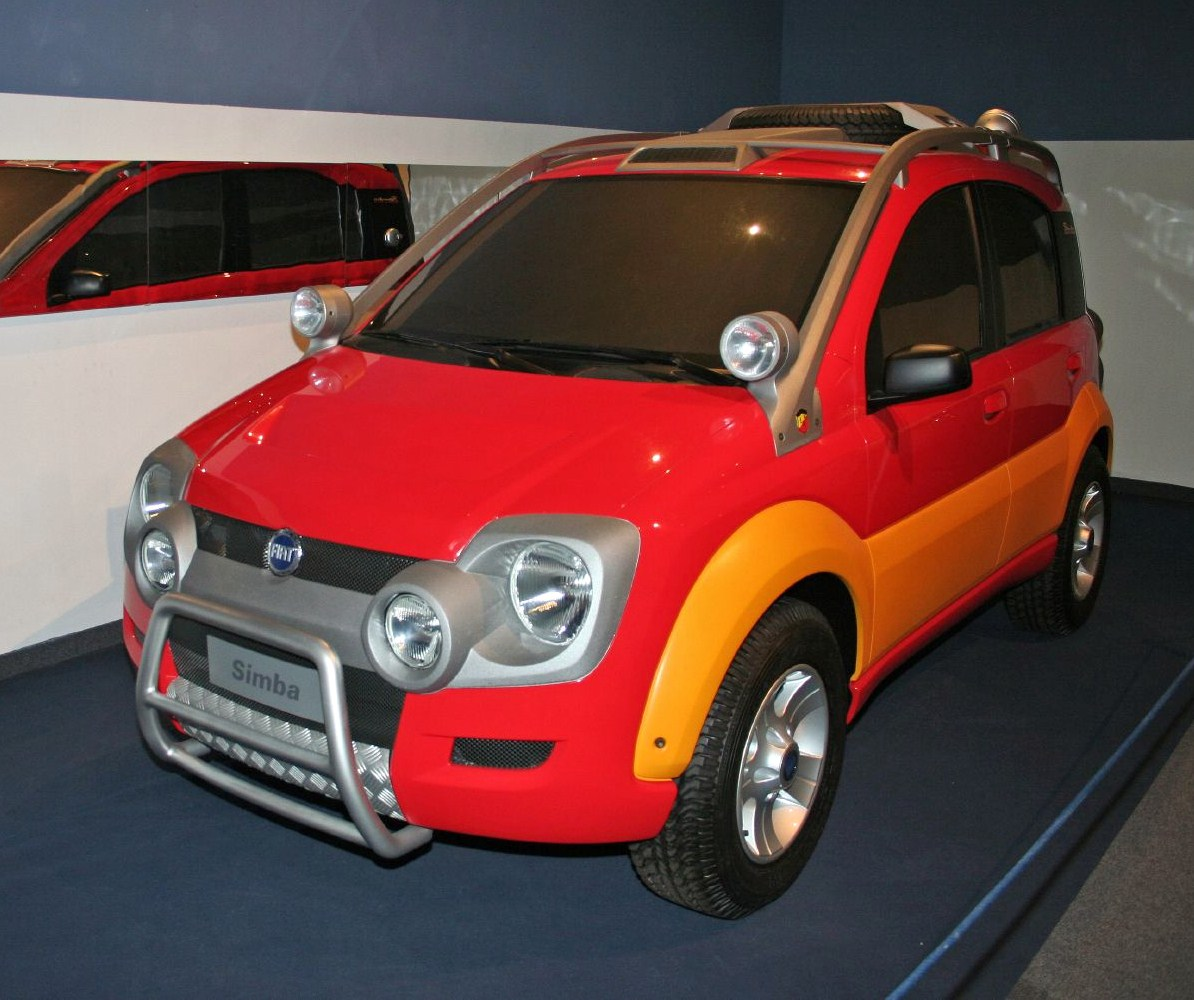
Fiat Simba Concept

The Simba was unveiled at the Bologna Motor Show in 2002 as a concept car to give an idea how the following year's production Panda would look. Some of the rugged styling cues made it on the production Cross model.

- Fiat Panda Aria

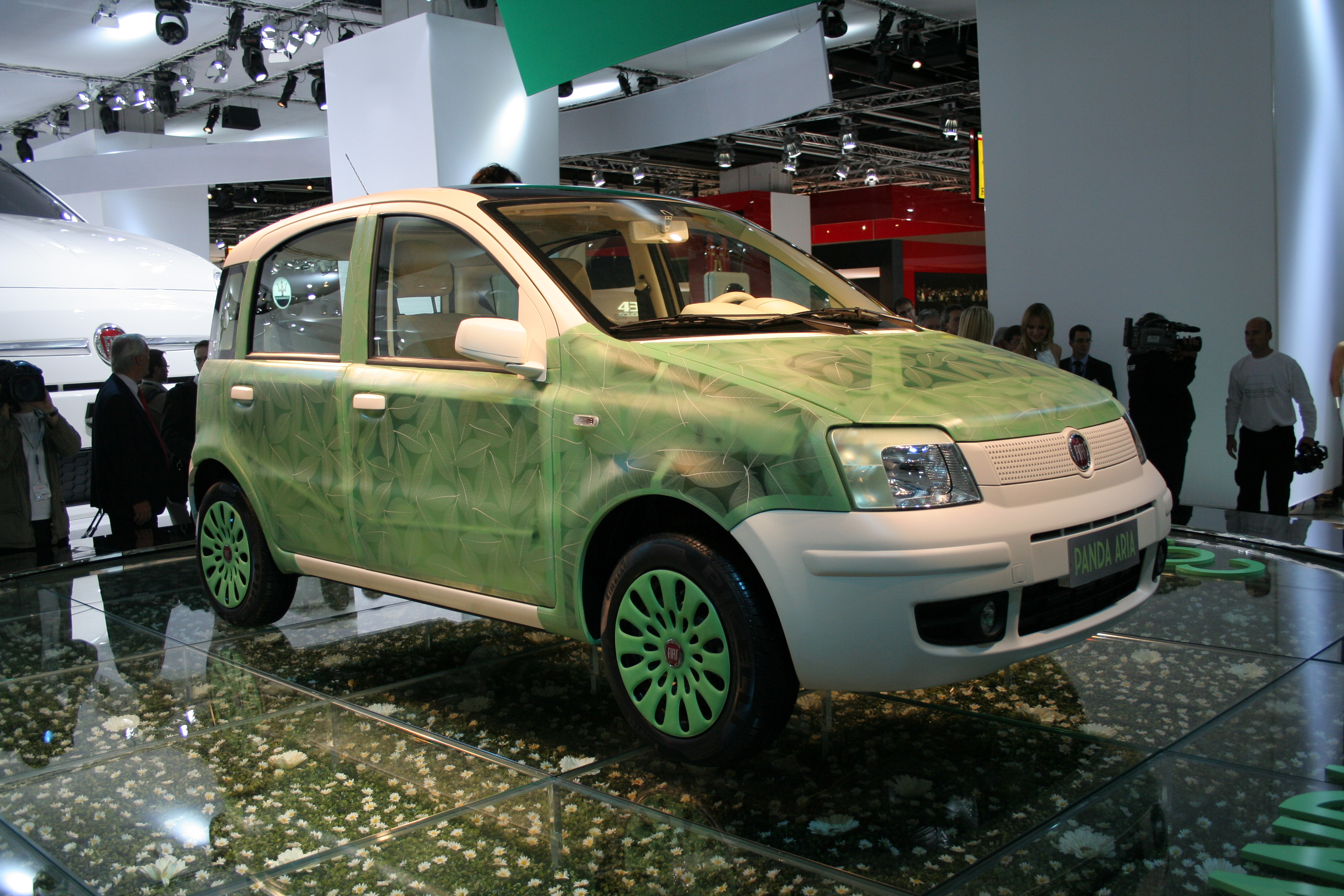
Fiat Panda Aria

Fiat presented Aria concept in Frankfurt Motor Show 2007. The Aria is equipped with new environment-friendly technology and outputs only 69 g/km CO_{2}. With 900 cc turbocharged straight-2 engine it produces 80 bhp (60 kW), and is also capable of using both petrol and CNG.

This new engine is equipped with Fiat's Multiair technology, which uses electrohydraulic valve activation system. In monofuel (petrol) version the engine is capable of producing 105 bhp (78 kW). The car is also equipped with Stop&Start function, which helps to reduce consumption by 10% in urban driving.

=== Engines ===
The smallest engine, the 1.1 L petrol SOHC FIRE engine, rated at 54 bhp (40 kW) is also found in the Fiat Seicento. This engine was originally developed and launched in the mid-1980s.

The 1.2-litre (actually 1,242 cc), 60 hp (45 kW) engine is a derivative of the 1.1 litre, but with higher torque.

The 1.3-litre Multijet diesel engine is rated at 75 bhp (56 kW) and 100 lb⋅ft (140 N⋅m) of torque; it is the most economical of all available engines. However, this engine is detuned from the Punto (where it develops 120 lb⋅ft (163 N⋅m) of torque) due to the Panda's weaker transmission. Pandas with diesel engines can be easily distinguished by a "Multijet" badge on the right side of the rear licence plate.

Introduced into the range in 2006 was the 1368 cc FIRE engine which had previously seen service in the Fiat Stilo and the second generation Punto Sporting (contrary to some press reports, it is not an adapted version of the 1.4 16v Starjet engine used in the Grande Punto). This FIRE engine has four cylinders in-line with sixteen valves actuated by belt driven double overhead camshafts.

The engine is undersquare with bore and stroke of 72 and 84 mm (2.8 and 3.3 in) respectively, running at a compression ratio of 10.8:1.

Engine	Year of introduction	Type	Displacement	Power at rpm	CO_{2} (g/Km)	0–100 km/h (0–62 mph)	Top speed	Average fuel use
1.1 Fire 8V	2003	straight-4, Petrol	1,108 cc	40 kW (54 PS; 54 hp)	133	15,0 s	93 mph (150 km/h)	41.8 mpg_{‑US} (5.63 L/100 km; 50.2 mpg_{‑imp})
1.1 Fire 8V Eco	2008	straight-4, Petrol	1,108 cc	40 kW (54 PS; 54 hp)	119	15,0 s	93 mph (150 km/h)	47.6 mpg_{‑US} (4.94 L/100 km; 57.2 mpg_{‑imp})
1.2 Fire 8V	2003	straight-4, Petrol	1,242 cc	44 kW (60 PS; 59 hp)	133	14,0 s	96 mph (154 km/h)	42.6 mpg_{‑US} (5.52 L/100 km; 51.2 mpg_{‑imp})
1.2 Fire 8V Eco	2008	straight-4, Petrol	1,242 cc	44 kW (60 PS; 59 hp)	119	14,0 s	96 mph (154 km/h)	47.6 mpg_{‑US} (4.94 L/100 km; 57.2 mpg_{‑imp})
1.2 Fire 8V Dualogic	2004	straight-4, Petrol	1,242 cc	44 kW (60 PS; 59 hp)	127	14,0 s	96 mph (154 km/h)	44 mpg_{‑US} (5.3 L/100 km; 53 mpg_{‑imp})
1.2 Fire 8V 4x4	2004	straight-4, Petrol	1,242 cc	44 kW (60 PS; 59 hp)	155	20,0 s	96 mph (154 km/h)	36.1 mpg_{‑US} (6.52 L/100 km; 43.4 mpg_{‑imp})
1.2 Fire 8V Natural Power	2006	straight-4, Petrol-Methane	1,242 cc	38–44 kW (52–60 PS; 51–59 hp)	113	19,0 s	86 mph (138 km/h)	38.3 mpg_{‑US} (6.14 L/100 km; 46.0 mpg_{‑imp})
1.2 Fire 8V GPL (LPG)	2008	straight-4, Petrol-LPG	1,242 cc	44 kW (60 PS; 59 hp)	116	14,0 s	96 mph (154 km/h)	33 mpg_{‑US} (7.1 L/100 km; 40 mpg_{‑imp})
1.4 Fire 16V 100HP	2006	straight-4, Petrol	1,368 cc	74 kW (100 PS; 100 hp)	154	9,5 s	114 mph (183 km/h)	36.6 mpg_{‑US} (6.43 L/100 km; 44.0 mpg_{‑imp})
1.3 Multijet 16V	2004	straight-4, Diesel	1,248 cc	51 kW (69 PS; 68 hp)	114	13,0 s	99 mph (159 km/h)	55.4 mpg_{‑US} (4.25 L/100 km; 66.5 mpg_{‑imp})
1.3 Multijet 16V 4x4	2005	straight-4, Diesel	1,248 cc	51 kW (69 PS; 68 hp)	136	19,0 s (18,0 s Cross)	99 mph (159 km/h) (93 mph (150 km/h) Cross)	45.6 mpg_{‑US} (5.16 L/100 km; 54.8 mpg_{‑imp})
1.3 Multijet 16V DPF	2007	straight-4, Diesel	1,248 cc	55 kW (75 PS; 74 hp)	113	13,0 s	102 mph (164 km/h)	55.5 mpg_{‑US} (4.24 L/100 km; 66.7 mpg_{‑imp})

=== Chinese copy lawsuit ===
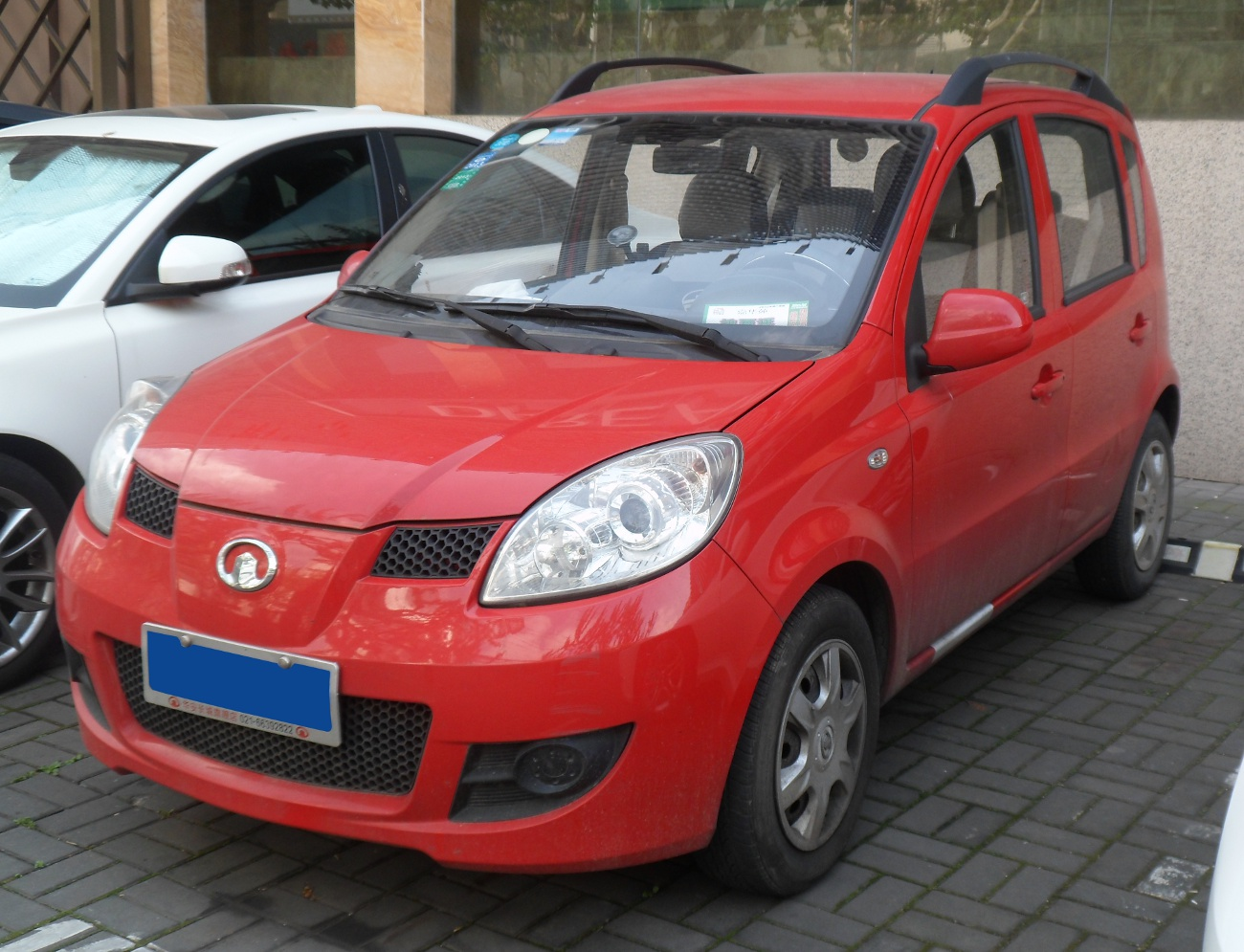
Great Wall Peri

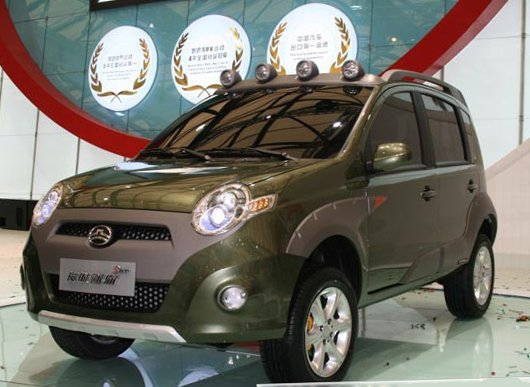
Great Wall Peri 4x4

In December 2006, Fiat considered taking legal action against Chinese automaker Great Wall Motor for the company's Peri, which is a copy of the Panda's design.

In July 2008, Fiat successfully sued Great Wall and had the Peri banned from importation into Europe. In addition, the court order ruled for Great Wall to pay Fiat a €15,000 fine for the first Peri imported, and an additional €50,000 for every subsequent car that was imported.

In October 2009, Great Wall Motor sued Fiat, accusing the latter of espionage. In the lawsuit, Great Wall claims that "Fiat once instigated espionage to prowl into its research center and take photos of Peri small car that was still under developed."

=== Production figures ===
Year	Production (units)
2003	86,046
2004	236,608
2005	231,982
2006	262,178
2007	260,695
2008	247,131
2009	298,020
2010	246,064
2011	205,765
2012	94,002

== Third generation (2011) ==
Third generation
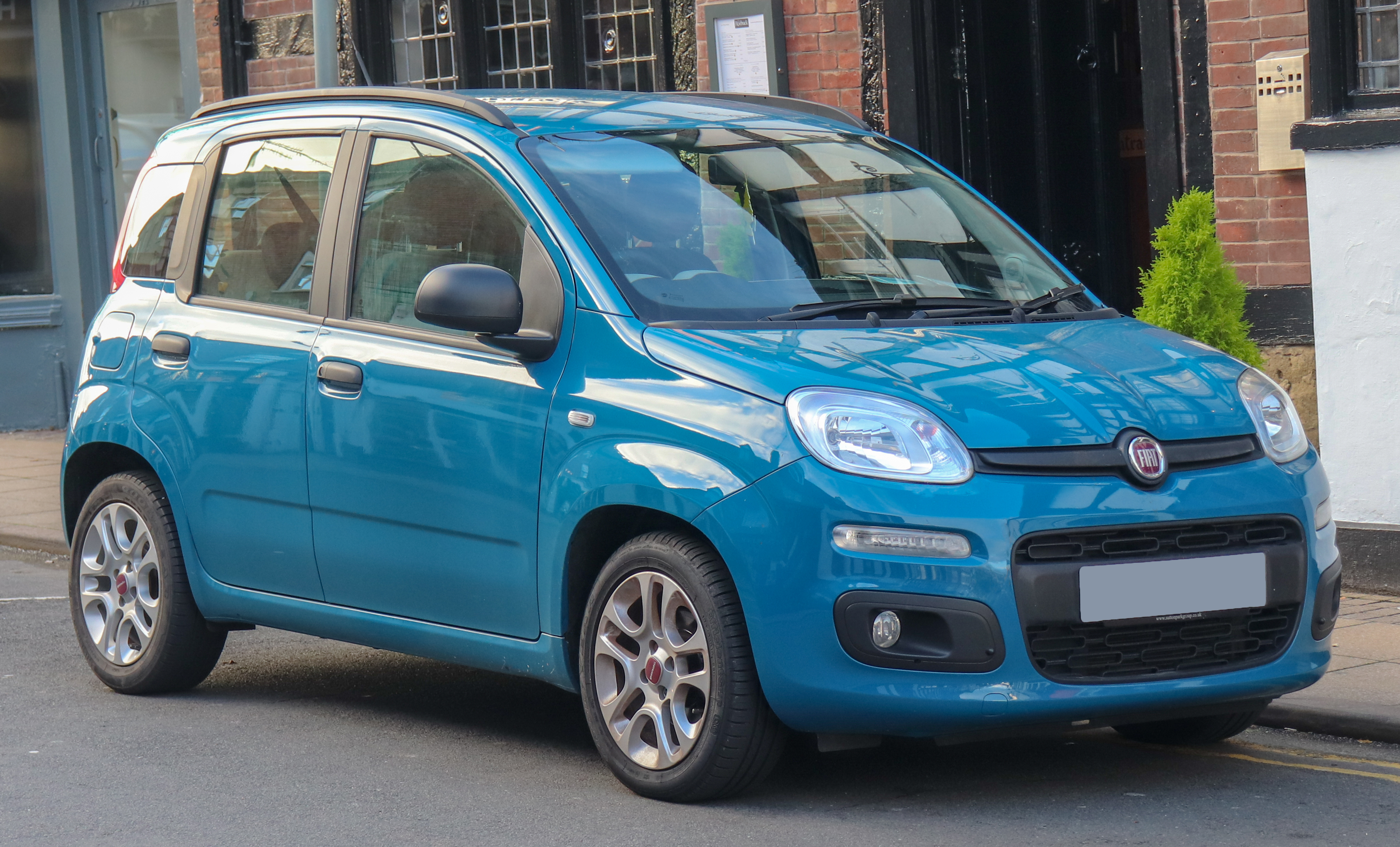
- 2012 Fiat Panda Easy (UK)

Overview
- Model code: 319
- Also called: Fiat Pandina
- Production: 2011–present
- Assembly: Italy: Pomigliano d'Arco (Stellantis Pomigliano Plant)
- Designer: Roberto Giolito at Centro Stile Fiat

Body and chassis
- Body style: 5-door hatchback
- Layout: Front-engine, front-wheel-drive or four-wheel-drive
- Platform: FCA Mini
- Related: Lancia Ypsilon; Fiat 500; Fiat Uno; Ford Ka

Powertrain
- Engine: Petrol: 0.9 L TwinAir turbo I2; 1.0 L TwinAir I2; 1.0 L GSE FireFly I3 (mild hybrid); 1.2 L FIRE I4; Petrol/CNG: 0.9 L TwinAir turbo I2; Petrol/LPG: 1.2 L FIRE I4; Diesel: 1.3 L Multijet turbo I4
- Transmission: 5-speed C514 manual; 5-speed C510 DS manual; 6-speed manual; 5-speed Dualogic automated manual
- Hybrid drivetrain: Mild Hybrid Electric vehicle (Panda hybrid)

Dimensions
- Wheelbase: 2,300 mm (90.6 in)
- Length: 3,653–3,686 mm (143.8–145.1 in)
- Width: 1,643–1,672 mm (64.7–65.8 in)
- Height: 1,551–1,605 mm (61.1–63.2 in)
- Curb weight: 940–1,115 kg (2,072–2,458 lb)

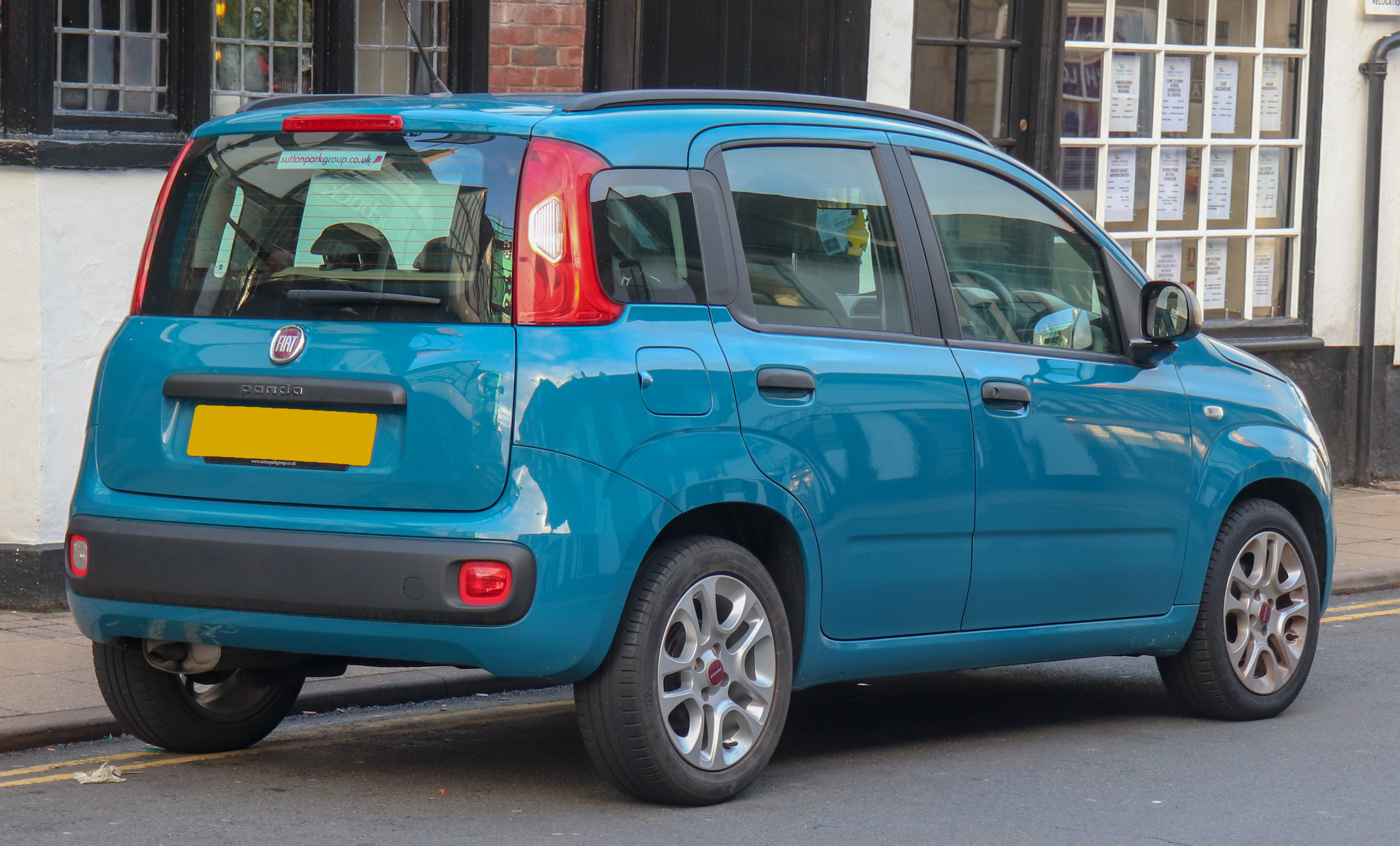
Rear view

Fiat presented the third generation of the Panda at the 2011 Frankfurt Motor Show in September 2011. The new architecture is based on the Fiat Mini platform. The production began in the renewed Pomigliano d'Arco Plant in the last quarter of 2011.

The previous model stayed in production and was sold as Panda Classic, remaining popular thanks to its lower pricing (about 27%). The decision to manufacture the car in Italy, instead of manufacturing it with the cheaper workforce in Tychy, Poland, was taken because of the agreement between Italian Prime Minister Mario Monti and Fiat directors not to close down any of Fiat's plants in Italy.

=== Models ===
==== Panda Natural Power ====
The Natural Power is the CNG/petrol bi-fuel version of the Panda. Unlike the previous generation – which adopted a 70 PS 1.4 FIRE inline four – it is powered by the turbocharged, 0.9 liter, two-cylinder TwinAir engine. The system is developed in-house and factory installed.

The CNG is stored in two – one 22 L and one 50 L – gas cylinders: the former housed longitudinally in the transmission tunnel, the latter transversally behind the rear axle. Due to the cylinders being both located under the floorpan, the boot's volume is reduced only by 25 liters – 200 L instead of the monofuel's 225. On the other hand, this requires a 40 mm taller ride height and a reworked, transversal silencer – thus the Natural Power uses the lifted chassis of the Trekking / 4x4 versions.

Total bi-fuel capacity is 72 liters – or 12 kilograms – of CNG and 35 L of petrol – two liters less than the monofuel's 37. At startup the engine runs on petrol, but switches to CNG immediately after; the car switches back to petrol automatically if it runs out of CNG or any time by driver's demand, via a dedicated button on the dashboard.

Due to the new tightening emissions regulations Euro 6d-Temp, after September 2018 the power output of the Natural Power TwinAir engine is reduced from 80 to 70 PS, when running on CNG – although remains 85 PS, when running on petrol.

==== Panda EasyPower ====
The EasyPower is the LPG/petrol bi-fuel version of the Panda; like the Natural Power it too is factory developed and manufactured. Its 1.2 FIRE inline four develops 69 PS.

==== Panda Trekking ====
Launched in late 2012, the Trekking is a two-wheel-drive model offering the looks and features of the Panda 4x4. It is distinguished from the 4x4, by the absence of skid plate inserts on bumpers, no "4x4" inlay in the bodyside molding and alloy wheels painted silver instead of a darker grey.

Available on this model are the 0.9 TwinAir turbocharged petrol and 1.3 Multijet II turbodiesel engines, with some offroad capabilities thanks to the "Traction +" ESC-based electronically simulated front locking differential and the standard M+S tires, along with the TwinAir Natural Power turbocharged petrol/methane engine without the latter capabilities.

The Panda Trekking stayed in production until late 2016.

==== Panda 4x4 ====
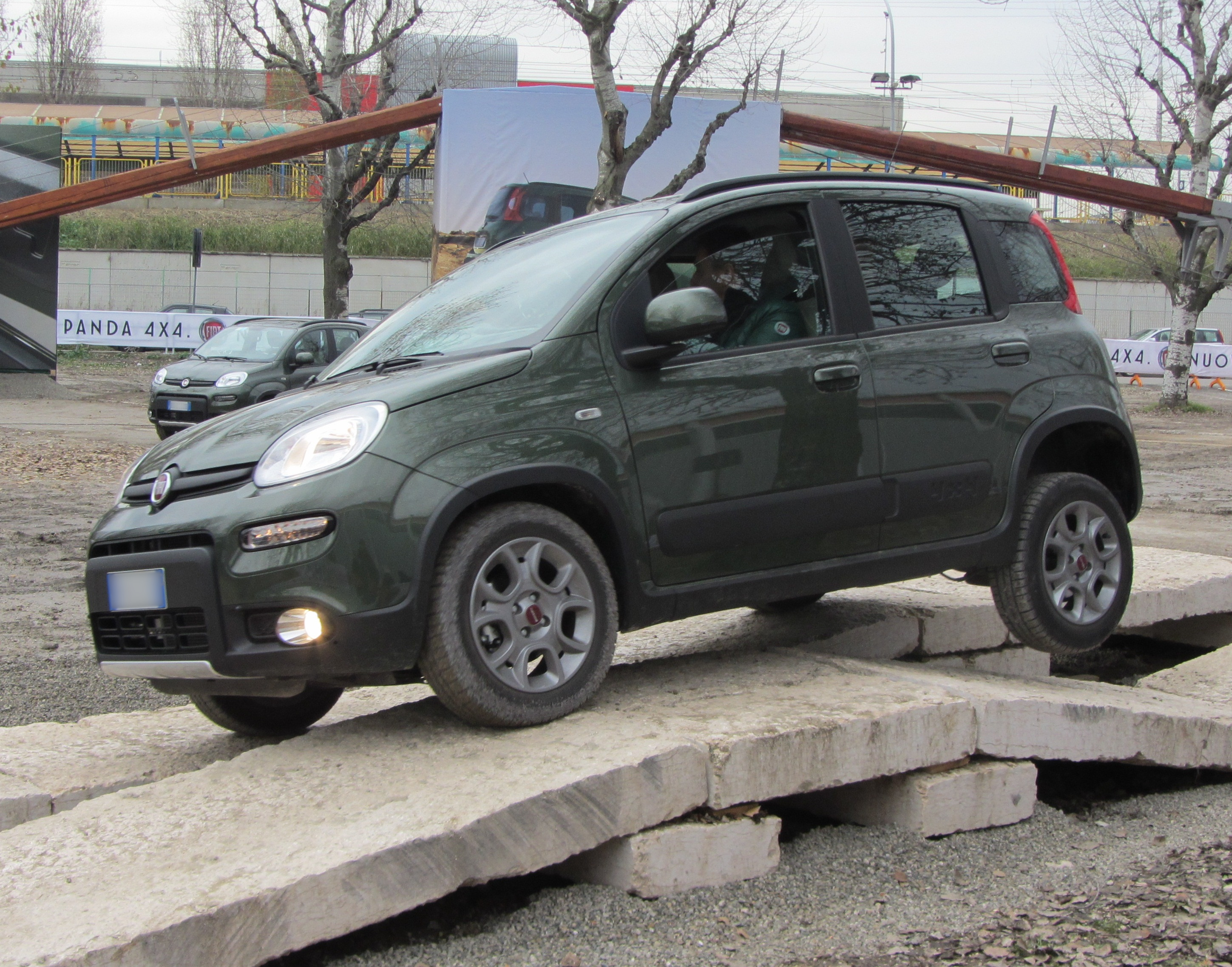
A Panda 4x4 in action

The third generation all wheel drive Panda was introduced at the 2012 Paris Motor Show. The engine lineup includes the TwinAir turbocharged petrol engine and Multijet II turbodiesel. The TwinAir engine is linked to a six-speed transmission with a short ratio first gear and the Diesel is linked to a 5-speed transmission.

The Panda 4x4 receives model specific bumpers with extra cladding, body side moldings, plastic wheelarch extensions and 175/65 M+S tires on 15" dark grey alloy wheels. The full-time all wheel drive system is composed by two open differentials front and rear and a rear-mounted electronically controlled coupling, which sends torque to the two axles in proportion depending on road conditions. At the rear is a specially developed torsion beam semi-independent suspension, a change from the previous generation's trailing arms.

An electronically simulated locking differential (termed ELD, Electronic Locking Differential) supplements the open-type differentials. The ELD works automatically by braking the wheel(s) where the ESC sensors detect excessive wheel slip, thus making the differentials more torque to the wheels in better traction conditions; this functionality is useful on low-grip surfaces, and is activated by the driver via a console switch.

All 4x4 models were discontinued in May 2022 because of components shortages, but Fiat reportedly hopes to bring back the 4x4 option in 2023.

==== Panda Cross / City Cross ====
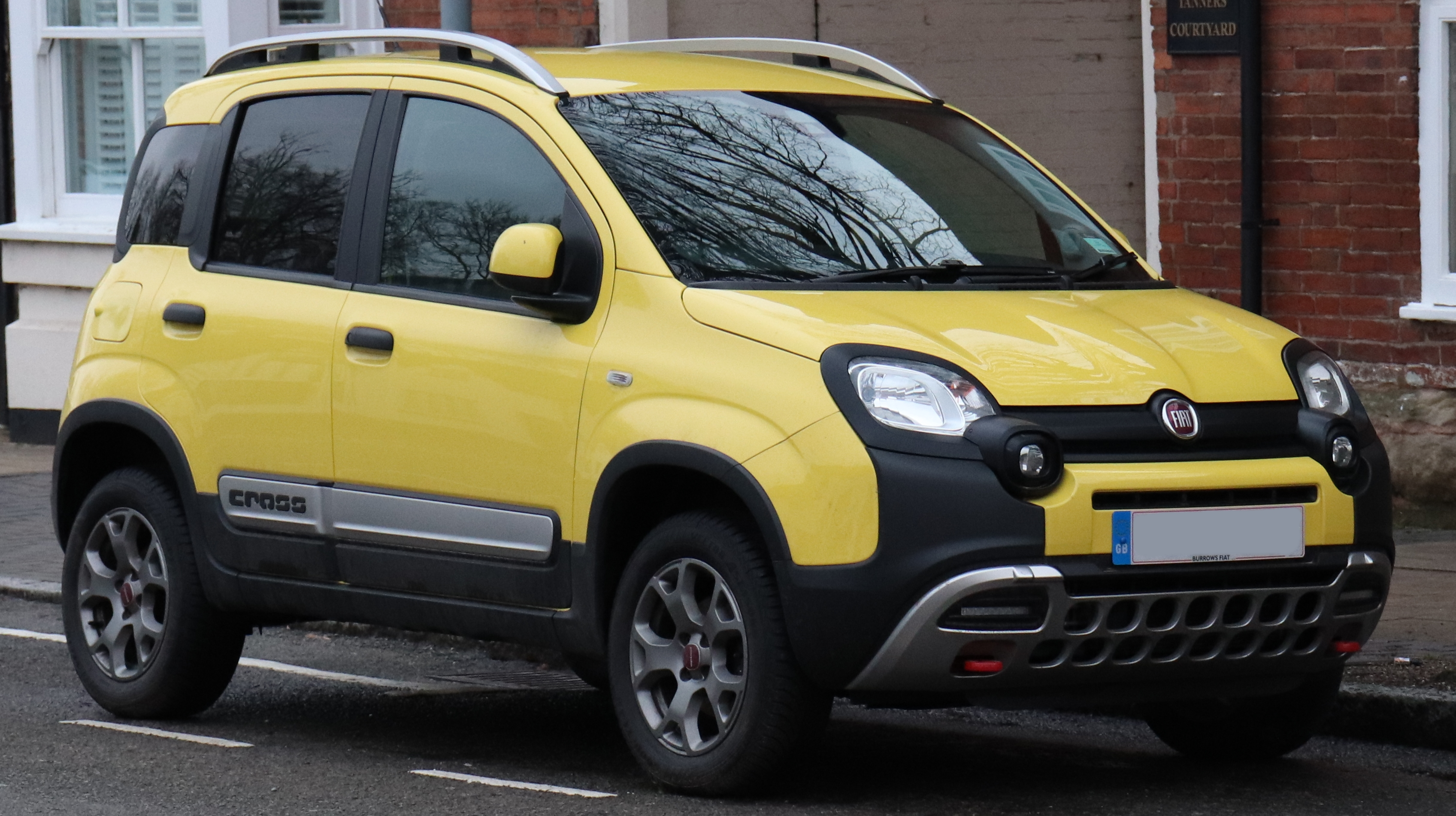

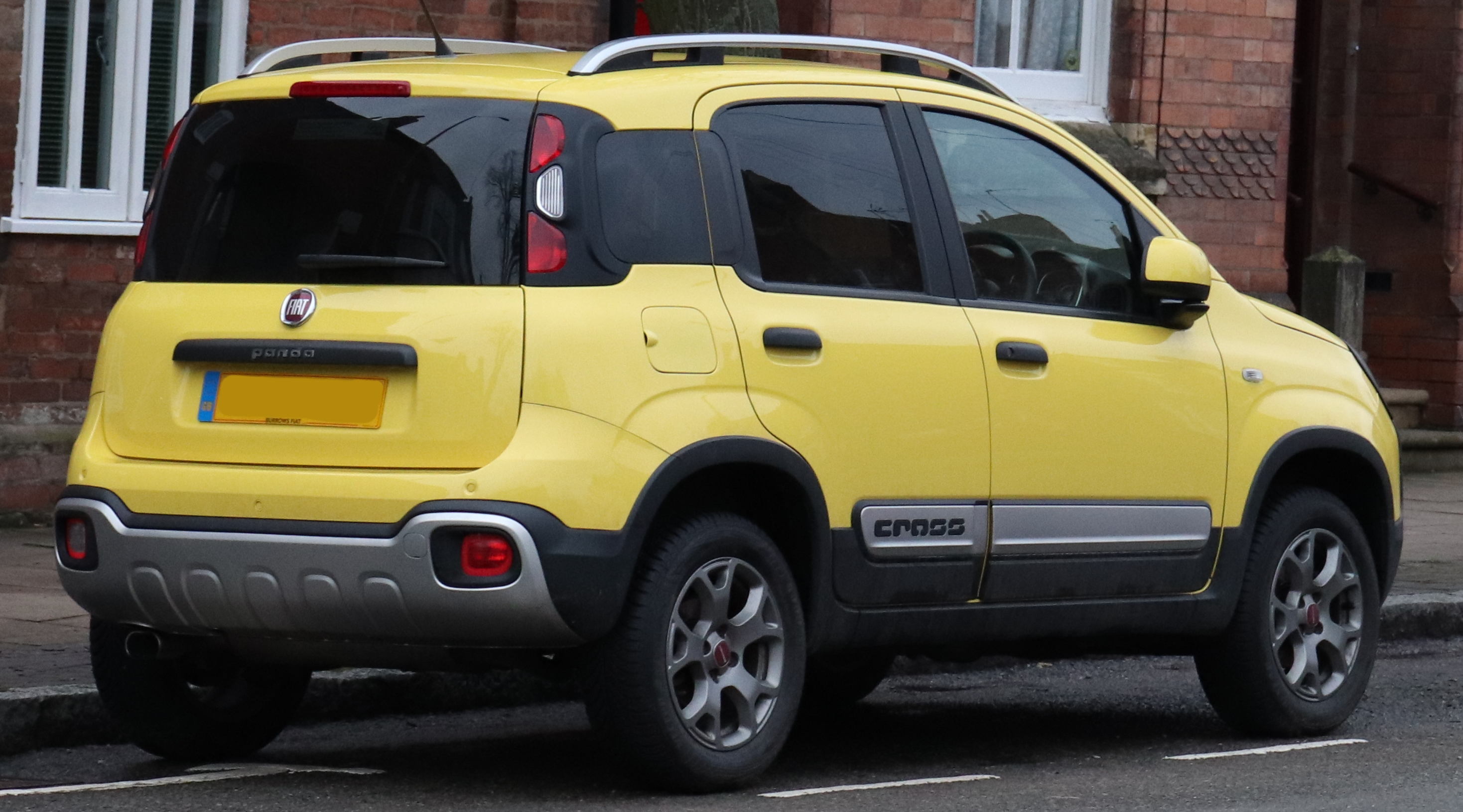
Fiat Panda Cross

Launched at the 2014 Geneva Motor Show, it is the range-topping, offroad-styled Panda. Mechanically it is based on the Panda 4x4, offering the same choice of powertrains. As in the previous generation the Cross is recognizable by its wider 185/65 tyres on specific alloy wheels, new fascias with prominent skid plates and unique broken up head- and taillights arrangement. The new bumpers, together with an increased ground clearance, give the car better approach and departure angles.

From 2017, a 4x2 Fiat Panda Cross is offered under the name Fiat City Cross.

In 2020, the Fiat Panda Cross and Fiat Panda City Cross changed names on the French market. Both models lost the "Panda" name: the Fiat Panda City Cross became the Fiat City Cross, and the Fiat Panda Cross became the Fiat City Cross 4x4. For other markets, this change did not occur. Late 2022, the name of the vehicle was changed again in France, as the Fiat City Cross became the Fiat Panda Cross (meaning Fiat France reused the original name of the Panda Cross 4x4 model to now designate the Panda Cross 4x2 model).

In late 2022, as all Fiat Panda 4x4 models have been discontinued, Fiat renamed the Fiat Panda City Cross (Fiat City Cross in France) as Fiat Panda Cross in all markets. In other words, the brand reused the original name of the Panda Cross 4x4 model to now designate the Panda Cross 4x2 model.

==== Panda Hybrid ====
In 2020, Fiat updated the Panda with mild-hybrid technology. It's a combination of a 1.0-litre 3-cylinder FireFly petrol engine, a 12-volt BSG (Belt-integrated Starter Generator) electric motor and an 11 Ah lithium-ion battery. Panda mild-hybrid mounts a KERS system.

==== Pandina ====
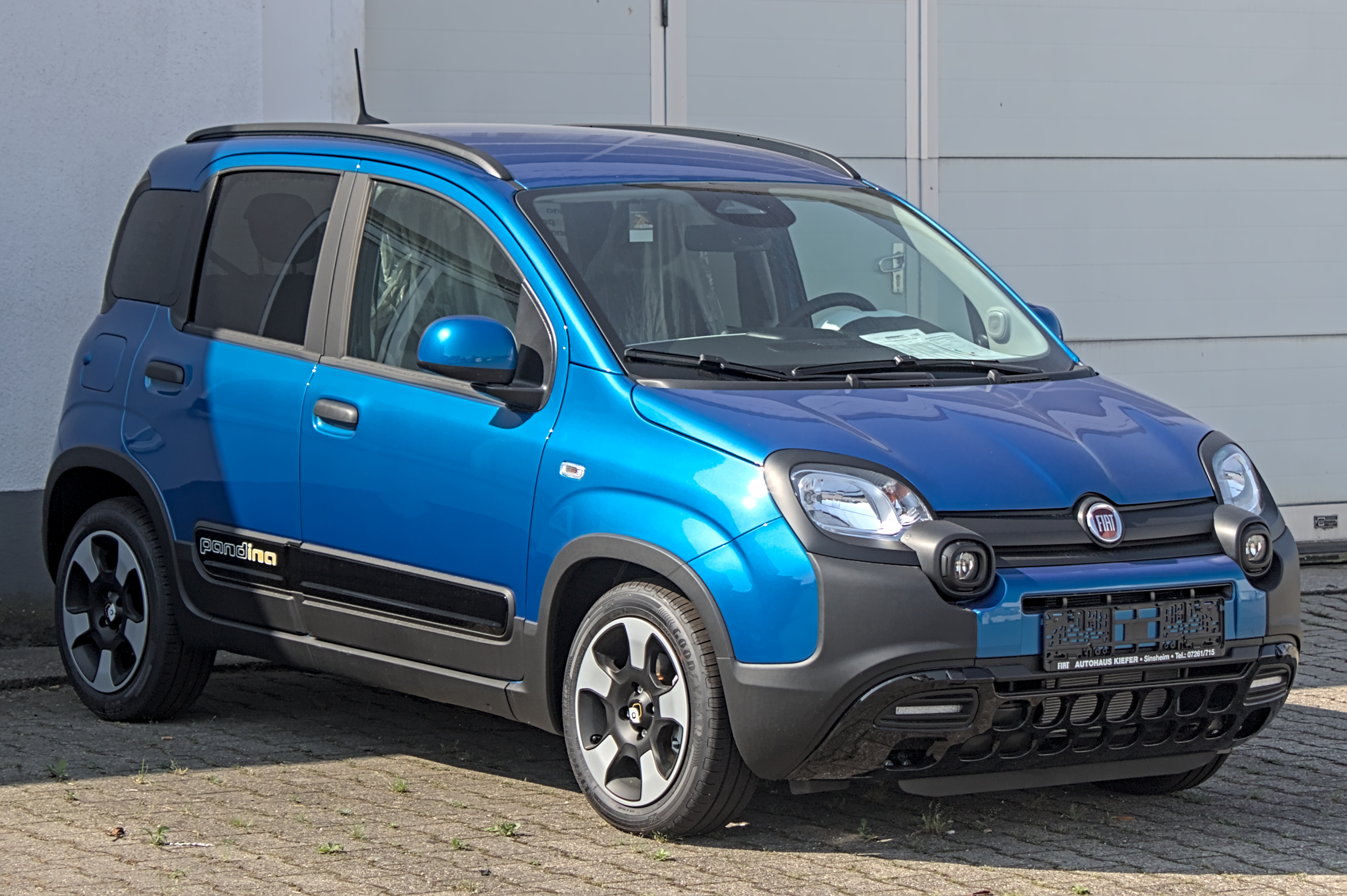
Fiat Pandina

In February 2024, Fiat announced a new special version of the Panda that would go by the name Pandina, to be available from summer 2024. The name Pandina is a tribute to the nickname that the Panda has in Italy, Pandina meaning 'little Panda'. The Pandina is based on the Cross model, and features a number of driver assistance systems to comply with the latest "GSR2" EU standards: advanced emergency braking system, lane keeping assist, drowsy driver detection, traffic sign recognition, rear parking sensors, cruise control and automatic high beam. The interior gains a 7-inch digital instrument panel and a 7-inch central entertainment screen. Mechanically the Pandina is identical to the Panda Hybrid.

In Europe, Fiat is offering the Pandina in only 12 countries: Italy, France, Belgium, Luxembourg, the Netherlands, Germany, Switzerland, Czech Republic, Austria, Poland, Spain and Portugal.

=== Special editions ===
==== Panda 4x4 Steyr ====
Austrian market only special edition, announced in 2012. Its Steyr Tractor theme celebrates the several collaborations throughout the years between Fiat and former Steyr-Daimler-Puch, such as the development of the original Panda's four-wheel-drive system. Built on the basis of the Panda 4x4 1.3 Multijet II with richer interior standard equipment, it was available in red or white with contrasting colour side stripes and Steyr logo decals.

==== Panda 4x4 Antarctica ====
This limited, 200 cars edition was premiered at the 2013 Frankfurt Motor Show, commemorating the 30th anniversary of the Panda 4x4. It was too based on the Panda 4x4 1.3 Multijet II, featuring several normally extra cost options like automatic climate control, parking sensors and Blue&Me Bluetooth connectivity as standard. The exterior was characterized by a white with black roof two-tone paint scheme accented by orange wheel centers and side mirror caps.

==== Panda 4×40° ====
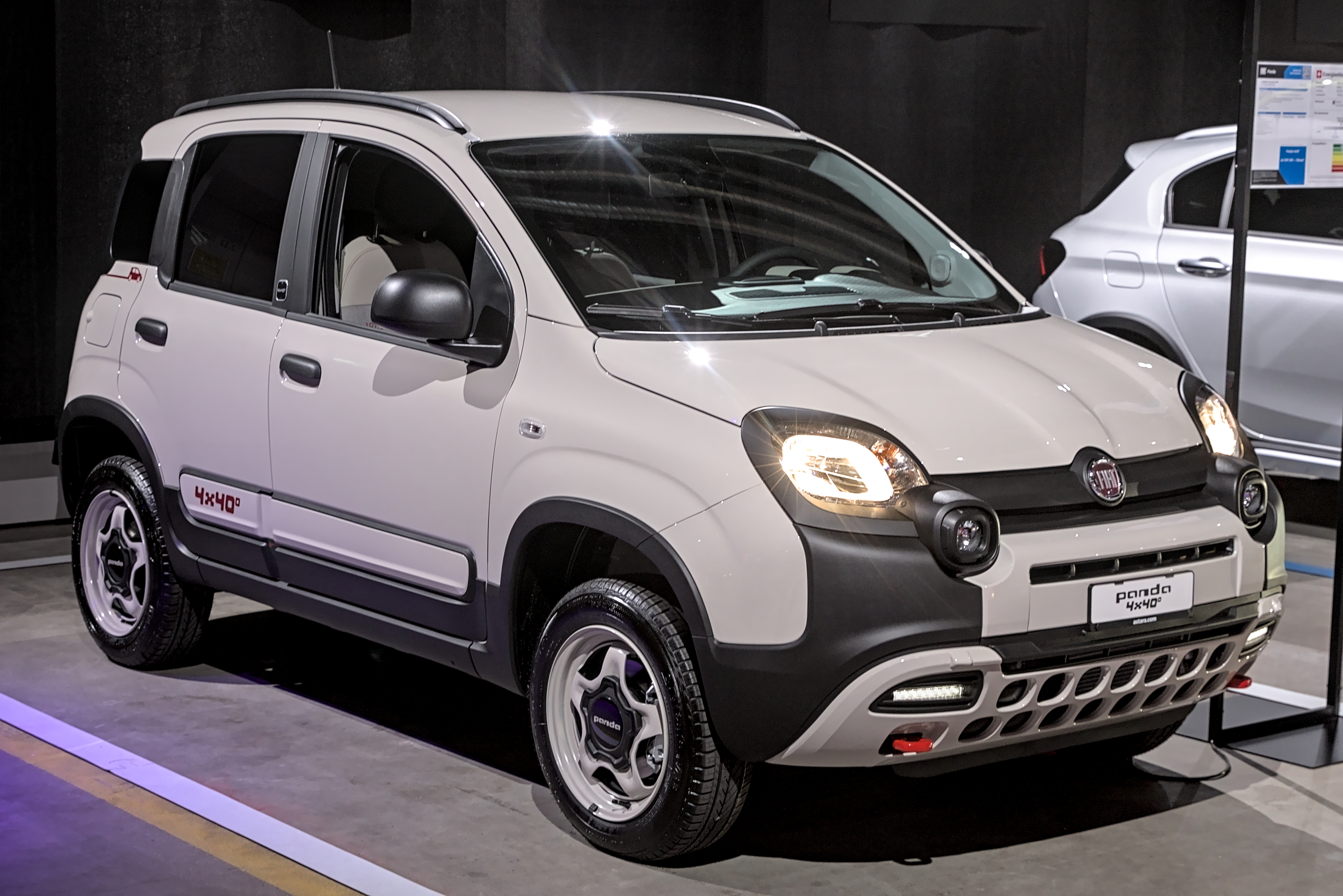
Fiat Panda 4×40°

Unveiled in June 2023, the Fiat Panda 4×40° celebrates 40 years of the Fiat Panda 4×4. Produced in 1,983 units, it is based on the 4×4 version and was available only in Italy, France, Germany, and Switzerland.

=== Safety ===
Euro NCAP test results* Fiat Panda (2011)
Test	Points	%
Overall:	4 /5 stars	
Adult occupant:	30	80%
Child occupant:	31	63%
Pedestrian:	18	49%
Safety assist:	3	43%

Euro NCAP test results* FIAT Panda (2018)
Test	Points	%
Overall:	0 /5 stars	
Adult occupant:	17.4	45%
Child occupant:	8	16%
Pedestrian:	22.9	47%
Safety assist:	1	7%

The third-generation Panda was tested by Euro NCAP towards the end of 2011, and achieved a four-star result. One star was dropped mainly because the Panda's electronic stability control wasn't available on all trim levels, such as one of the tested cars. Fiat clarified on the same day that ESC would be offered on the entire Fiat Panda range in the first months of 2012. It was retested in 2018 to a 0 star result as the protocol had evolved but not the car.

==== Collision avoidance system ====
Fiat's City Brake Control low-speed crash avoidance system is available as optional on the Panda. The system works by readying and if necessary automatically executing an emergency stop whenever an imminent collision is detected by its laser sensor. In 2013, City Brake Control attained the Euro NCAP Advanced reward.

=== Records ===
At 5:28pm on Monday 11 February 2013, Philip Young and Paul Brace broke the world record drive, in either direction, from Cape Town in South Africa to London in Great Britain with a Fiat Panda two-cylinder 0.9 TwinAir. The drive started on 1 February and ended 10 days, 13 hours and 28 minutes later, shaving over a day off the previous record, achieved in 2010 by a Land Rover Defender, and a further 4 seconds off the Cape Town to London record, set in 1983.

=== Awards ===
- Panda 4x4: Top Gear Magazine's "SUV of the Year 2012".
- Panda TwinAir Turbo Natural Power: "Das grünste Auto der Schweiz 2013" ("Greenest car in Switzerland"), part of Swiss Car of the Year 2013.

=== Engines ===
Engine	Year of introduction	Type	Displacement	Power at rpm	Torque at rpm	CO_{2}/km	0–100 km/h (0–62 mph)	Top speed
1.0 TwinAir	2011, from launch	straight-2, petrol	964 cc	60 PS (44 kW; 59 hp) at 6,250	88 N⋅m (65 lb⋅ft) at 3,500	99 g/km	15,7 s	159 km/h (99 mph)
0.9 TwinAir Turbo	2011, from launch	straight-2, petrol	875 cc	85 PS (63 kW; 84 hp) at 5,500	145 N⋅m (107 lb⋅ft) at 1,900	99 g/km	11,2 s	177 km/h (110 mph)
0.9 TwinAir Turbo Dualogic	2011, from launch	straight-2, petrol	875 cc	78 PS (57 kW; 77 hp) at 5,500	145 N⋅m (107 lb⋅ft) at 2,000	95 g/km	11,2 s	177 km/h (110 mph)
1.2 Fire 8v	2011, from launch	straight-4, petrol	1,242 cc	69 PS (51 kW; 68 hp) at 5,500	102 N⋅m (75 lb⋅ft) at 3,000	120 g/km	14,2 s	164 km/h (102 mph)
1.3 Multijet II	2011, from launch	straight-4, Diesel	1,248 cc	75 PS (55 kW; 74 hp) at 4,000	190 N⋅m (140 lb⋅ft) at 1,500	104 g/km	12,8 s	168 km/h (104 mph)
0.9 TwinAir Turbo Natural Power	2012	straight-2, petrol-methane	875 cc	80 PS (59 kW; 79 hp) at 5,500	140 N⋅m (100 lb⋅ft) at 2,500	86 g/km	12,0 s	170 km/h (110 mph)
1.2 EasyPower	2012	straight-4, petrol-LPG	1,242 cc	69 PS (51 kW; 68 hp) at 5,500	102 N⋅m (75 lb⋅ft) at 3,000	116 g/km	14,2 s	164 km/h (102 mph)
0.9 TwinAir Turbo Natural Power	2018, September	straight-2, petrol-methane	875 cc	70 PS (51 kW; 69 hp) at 5,500	140 N⋅m (100 lb⋅ft) at 2,500	97 g/km (Euro 6d-Temp)	14,1 s	162 km/h (101 mph)
1.0 FireFly	2020	straight-3, petrol-electric mild-hybrid	999 cc	70 PS (51 kW; 69 hp) at 6,000	92 N⋅m (68 lb⋅ft) at 3,500	119 g/km - 126 g/km	13,9 s	164 km/h (102 mph)
1.3 Multijet III Trekking	2015	straight-4, Diesel	1248cc	95 hp (70 kW) at 4000		100 g/km		110 mph

== Fiat Grande Panda (2024) ==
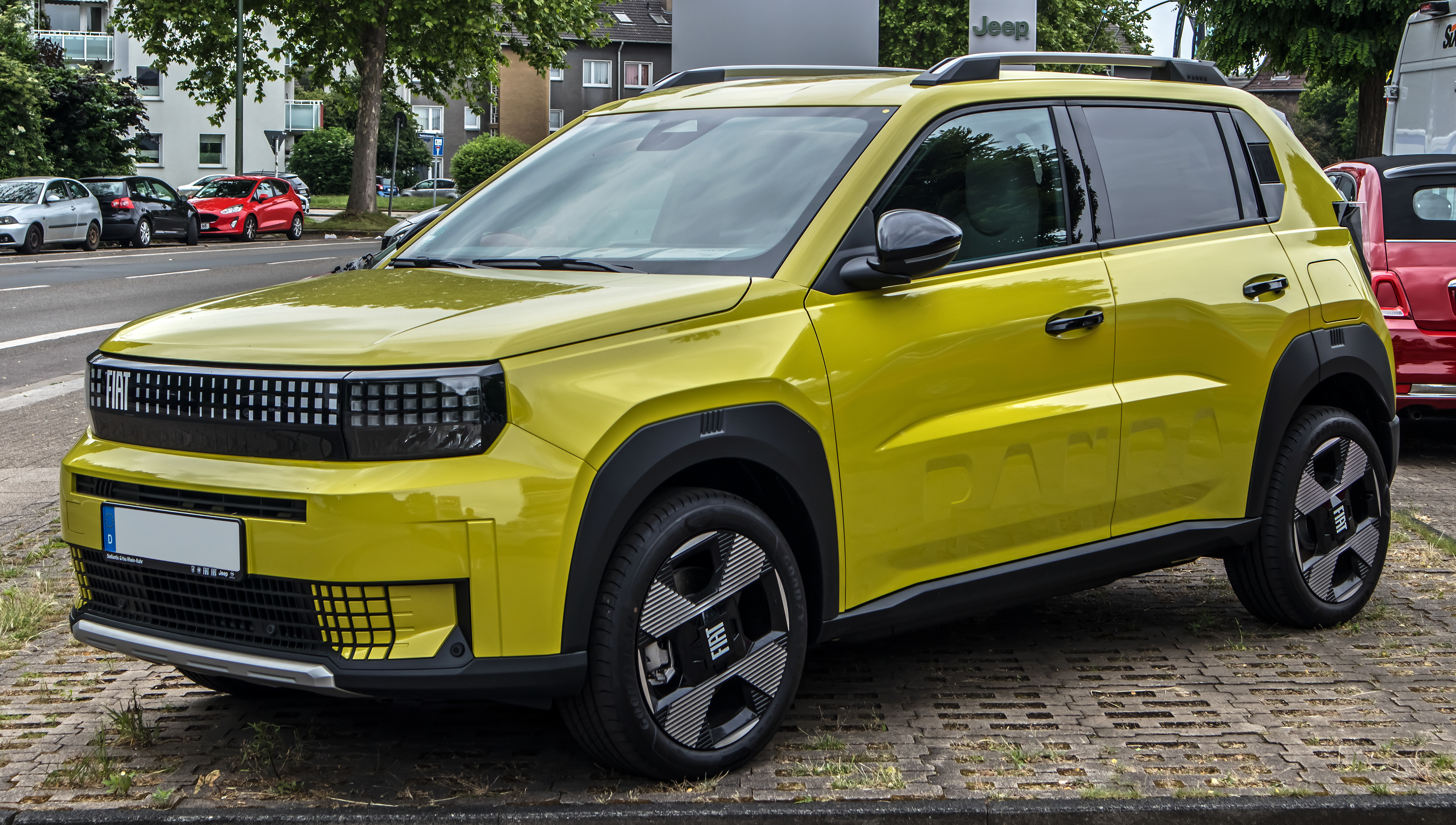
Fiat Grande Panda (front)

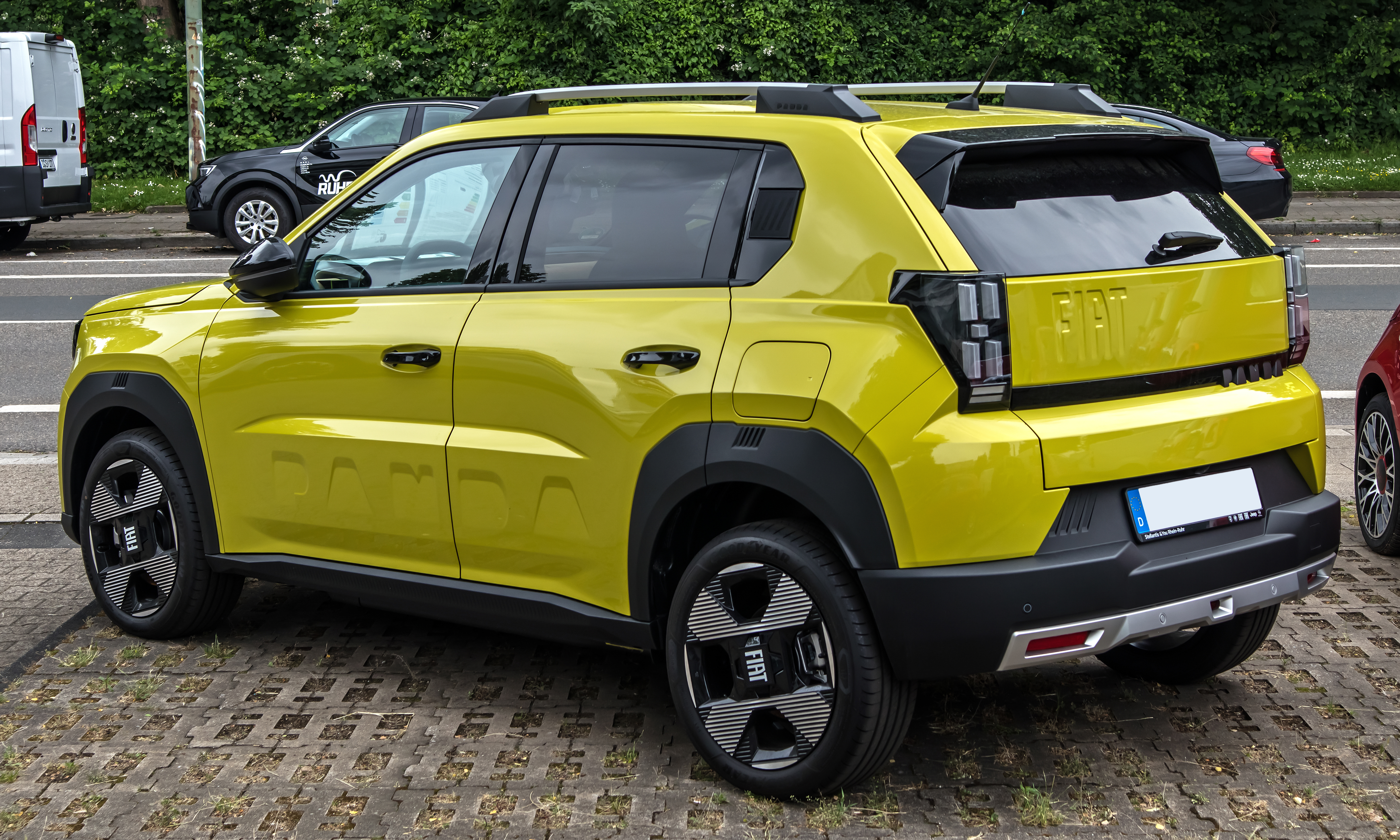
Fiat Grande Panda (rear)

A B-segment version of Panda was introduced on 14 June 2024, with the interior and full specifications was later revealed on 11 July coincided with Fiat’s 125th anniversary "Smiling to the Future” ceremony. It is marketed as the Grande Panda, based on the Smart Car platform shared with the fourth-generation Citroën C3 and Opel Frontera. It is sold with mild hybrid and fully electric powertrains.
