= Fiat 100 series engine =

Fiat 100 engine
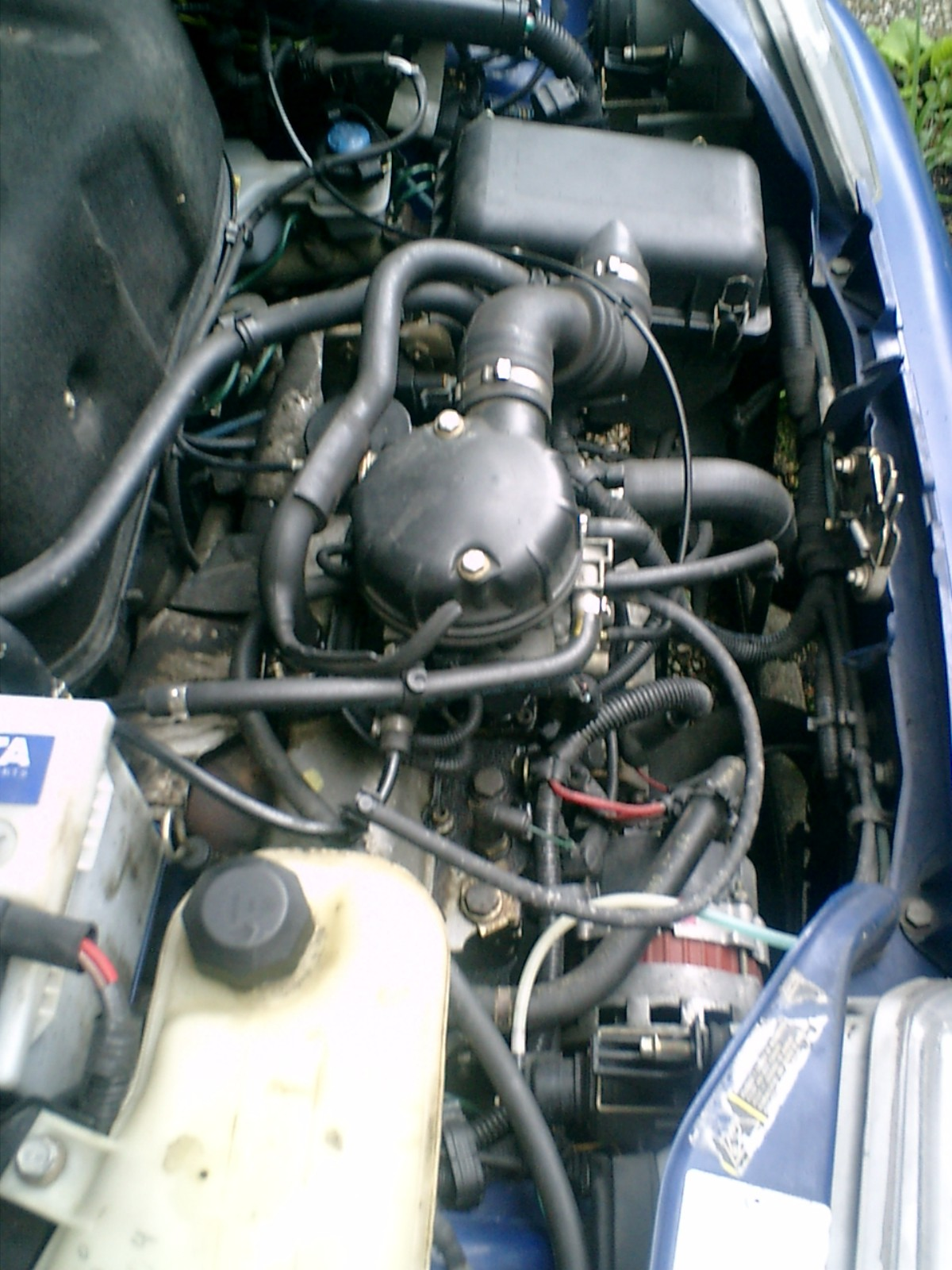
- Fiat 100GL.000 engine in a Fiat Cinquecento

Overview
- Manufacturer: Fiat
- Production: 1955–2008

Layout
- Configuration: Inline-4
- Displacement: 633–1,050 cc (38.6–64.1 cu in)
- Cylinder block material: cast iron
- Cylinder head material: aluminium
- Valvetrain: OHV 2 valves x cyl.

Combustion
- Fuel system: Carburettor; Single-point injection
- Fuel type: Gasoline
- Cooling system: Water-cooled

Output
- Power output: 21.5–70 PS (15.8–51.5 kW)

Emissions
- Emissions control systems: Catalytic converter (since early '90s)

Chronology
- Successor: Fiat FIRE

Designed by Dante Giacosa, the Fiat 100 engine first appeared in a 633 cc (38.6 cu in) form in the all-new Fiat 600 in 1955. The in-line four-cylinder engine comprised an iron block and an aluminium cylinder head with pushrod actuated valves. The engine was produced at Fiat's Mirafiori (Turin) plant, and then at Bielsko-Biała, and remained in production until 2000, used in Fiat Panda and Fiat Seicento in its last 899 cc (54.9 cu in) capacity version fitted with SPI single-point injection and hydraulic tappets, although slowly being phased out starting from 1985 in favour of the new Fiat FIRE engine.

It was also produced until 2008 in the 21. maj DMB plant for Zastava.

== Engine specifications ==
The 100-series engine has a three main bearing crankshaft, a cast iron block and an aluminium cylinder head with an integrated intake manifold. The camshaft was placed in the block and was chain driven. There were 2 overhead valves per cylinder, actuated by an OHV valvetrain. Early versions were fed by a carburettor, but single point fuel injection with catalyst would appear in the early '90s to fulfill anti-pollution laws, along with electronic Distributorless Ignition System.

List of 100 series engines
- 60.0 x 56.0 mm 633 cc (38.6 cu in) 21.5–22–24.5 PS (15.8–16.2–18.0 kW) (Fiat 600 1957–1960)
- 61.0 x 64.0 mm 748 cc (45.6 cu in) 38 PS (28 kW) (Fiat 600 Abarth 750)
- 62.0 x 63.5 mm 767 cc (46.8 cu in) 25 PS (18 kW) (Zastava 750)
- 62.0 x 63.5 mm 767 cc (46.8 cu in) 29 PS (21 kW) (Fiat 600D, Fiat 600T, Fiat 770 (Argentina), SEAT 800)
- 62.0 x 63.5 mm 767 cc (46.8 cu in) 30 PS (22 kW) (Zastava 750 SE)
- 65.0 x 58.0 mm 769 cc (46.9 cu in) 34 PS (25 kW) (Fiat Panda 750 Young)
- 64.0 x 63.5 mm 817 cc (49.9 cu in) 47 PS (35 kW) (Fiat 850 Sport Spider and 850 Sport Coupé) US spec
- 65.0 x 63.5 mm 843 cc (51.4 cu in) 34 PS (25 kW) (Fiat 850, Fiat Panda 34, SEAT Marbella, SEAT 133
- 65.0 x 63.5 mm 843 cc (51.4 cu in) 47 PS (35 kW) (Fiat 850 Coupé and 850 Special)
- 65.0 x 63.5 mm 843 cc (51.4 cu in) 49 PS (36 kW) (Fiat 850 Spider)
- 62.5 x 69.0 mm 846 cc (51.6 cu in) 50 PS (37 kW) (Fiat 600 Abarth 850)
- 63.0 x 68.0 mm 848 cc (51.7 cu in) 32 PS (24 kW) (Zastava 750 850)
- 65.0 x 67.7 mm 899 cc (54.9 cu in) 39 PS (29 kW) (Fiat Cinquecento, Fiat Seicento, Fiat Panda, Fiat Uno Mk2)
- 65.0 x 68.0 mm 903 cc (55.1 cu in) 34 PS (25 kW) (Fiat 850T, Fiat 900T/E)
- 65.0 x 68.0 mm 903 cc (55.1 cu in) 45 PS (33 kW) (Fiat 127 second-third series, Fiat Panda 45 Mk1, Fiat Uno 45 Mk1, Fiat Uno 45 Mk2 entry level base model ('Formula' in the UK), SEAT Marbella, SEAT Fura, SEAT Ibiza Junior, Zastava Koral)
- 65.0 x 68.0 mm 903 cc (55.1 cu in) 47 PS (35 kW) (Fiat 127 first series, Lancia A112)
- 65.0 x 68.0 mm 903 cc (55.1 cu in) 52 PS (38 kW) (Fiat 850 Sport Spider and 850 Sport Coupé)
- 67.2 x 68.0 mm 965 cc (58.9 cu in) 48 PS (35 kW) (Lancia A112 Elite-Elegant, Fiat Panda 4x4 Mk1)
- 65.0 x 74.0 mm 982 cc (59.9 cu in) 58 PS (43 kW) (Lancia A112 Abarth 58 HP, Fiat 600 Abarth 1000)
- 66.5 x 72.7 mm 1,010 cc (62 cu in) 52 PS (38 kW) (SEAT 127 1010)
- 67.2 x 74.0 mm 1,050 cc (64 cu in) 70 PS (51 kW) (Lancia A112 Abarth 70 HP)

== Applications ==
List of vehicles utilising variations of the Fiat 100-series engine.

- Fiat/SEAT 600 (1955)
- Fiat 600 Multipla (1955)
- Fiat 600 Abarth 750/850/1000 (1957)
- SEAT 800 (1964)
- Fiat 850 1964
- Fiat 850 Coupé and Spider (1965)
- Fiat 850T (1965)
- Fiat 770 Coupé Vignale (1968)
- Fiat 850 Special (1968)
- Fiat 850 Sport Coupé and Sport Spider (1968)
- Autobianchi A112 (1969)
- Fiat/SEAT 127 (1971)
- Fiat/SEAT 133 (1974)
- Fiat 900T (1976)
- Fiat Uno 45 (1983)
- Fiat/SEAT Panda 45 (1980)
- Seat Marbella (1988)
- Seat Trans/Terra (1986)
- Seat Ibiza Junior (1986)
- Fiat Fiorino (1977)
- Fiat Cinquecento (1992)
- Fiat Seicento(1998)

(1962 - 2012)

- Zastava 600 (1961)
- Zastava 750 (1962 - 1985)
- Zastava Yugo/Yugo Koral (1978-2008)
