= List of microcars by country of origin: Y =

== List ==
Country	Automobile Name	Manufacturer	Engine Make/Capacity	Seats	Year	Other information
Yugoslavia	Zastava 600	Zastava, Kragujevac	633 cc	4	1955-1962	Licence-built version of Fiat 600
