= Red Fićo =

Monument in Osijek, Croatia

Coordinates: 45°33′17″N 18°41′45″E

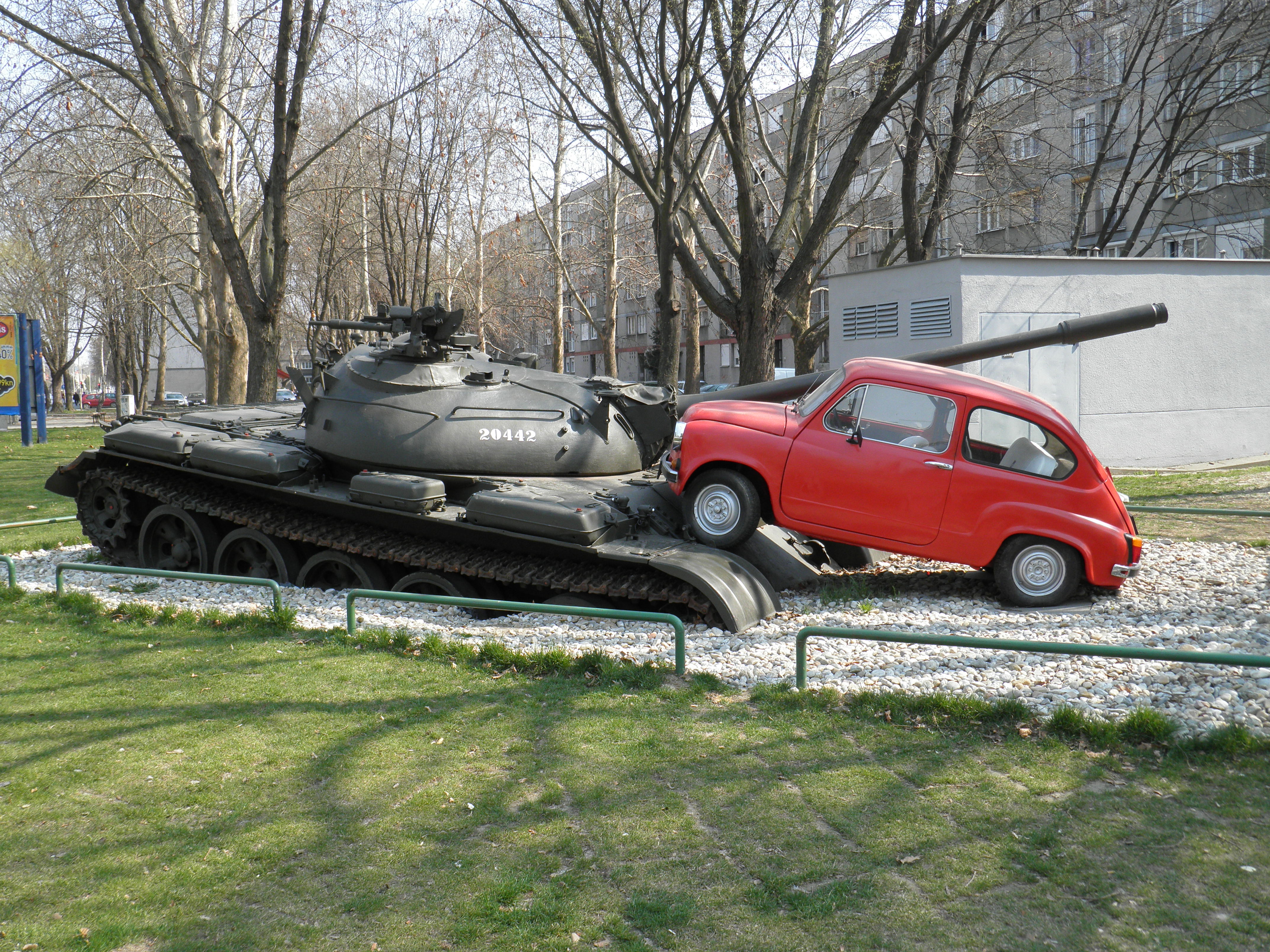
The monument pictured in 2012

The Red Fićo (Croatian: Crveni Fićo), officially Fićo gazi tenka! ('Fićo tramples a tank!') is a monument in Osijek, Croatia. It commemorates the destruction of a Zastava 750 car (popularly known in Croatia as the Fićo) by a Yugoslav Army tank at the start of the Croatian War of Independence, an event that became a symbol of Croatian resistance. The monument, unveiled in 2011, depicts a Soviet-made T-55 tank seemingly sinking into the ground while being run over by a red Zastava 750.

== Background ==
Footage of the incident
- Youtube

Following the Croatian declaration of independence from Yugoslavia on 25 June 1991, the Yugoslav army moved into Osijek on 27 June, meeting little opposition as Croatia had no army of its own. Croatian citizen Branko Breškić had followed the Yugoslav tanks entering the town and overtook them in his Zastava 750 to try to halt their advance. Breškić stopped his car at the intersection between Vukovarska Street and Trpimira Street in front of the advancing column, and got out of the vehicle. The lead tank was a T-55 driven by another Croatian, Josip Ilić. He was ordered at gunpoint by his Yugoslav tank commander to drive over the empty car and he did so, destroying it. This was one of the first attacks by the Yugoslav forces against civilians in Croatia during the War of Independence.

Footage of the event was recorded by reporter Žarko Plevnik and broadcast worldwide, becoming a symbol of Croatian resistance. Breškić went on to enlist in the Croatian Army and fought in the war, being wounded several times.

== Monument ==
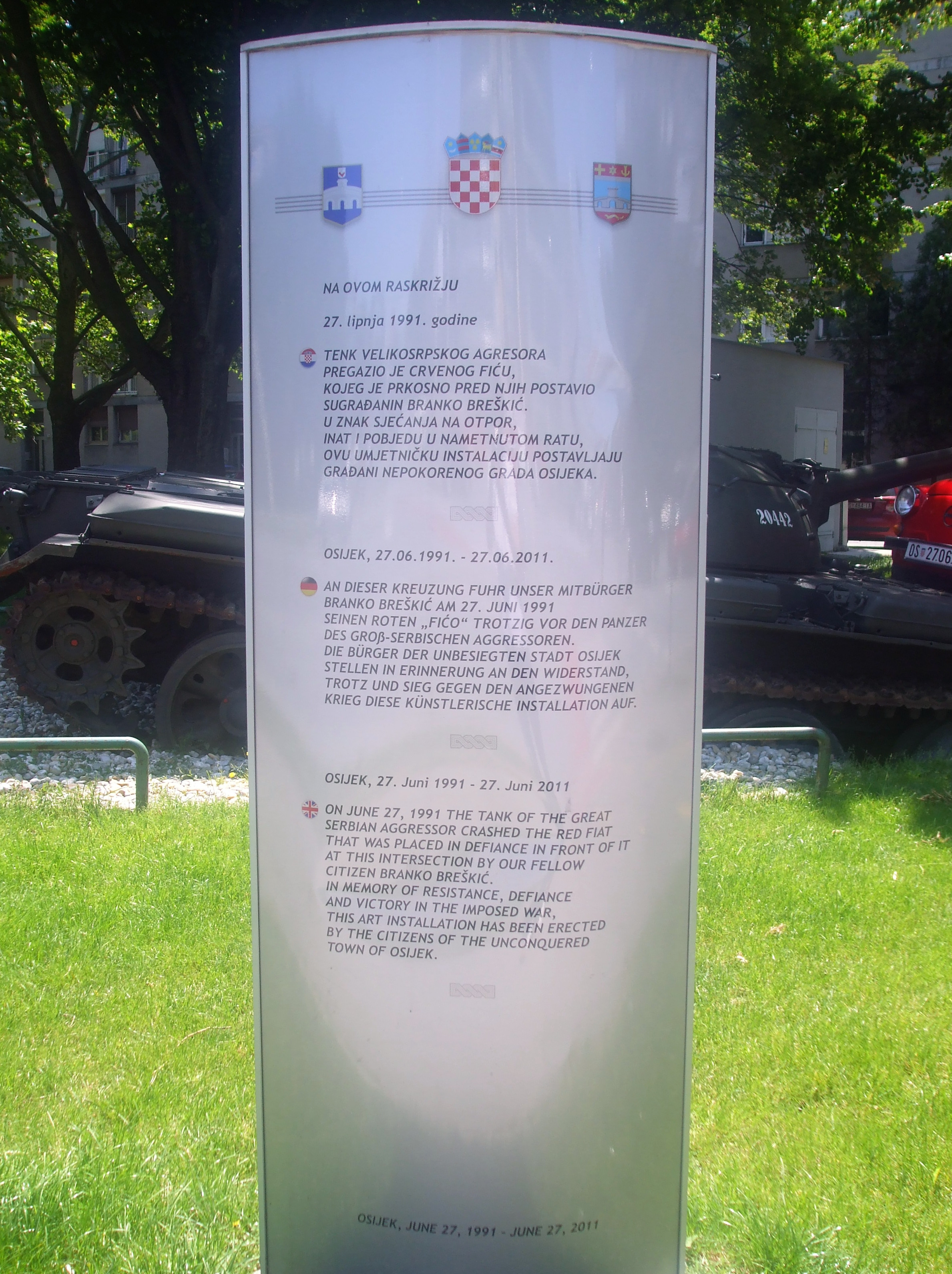
Plaque at the site. Note the English text refers the car as a Fiat; the Fićo is a licensed version of the Fiat 600.

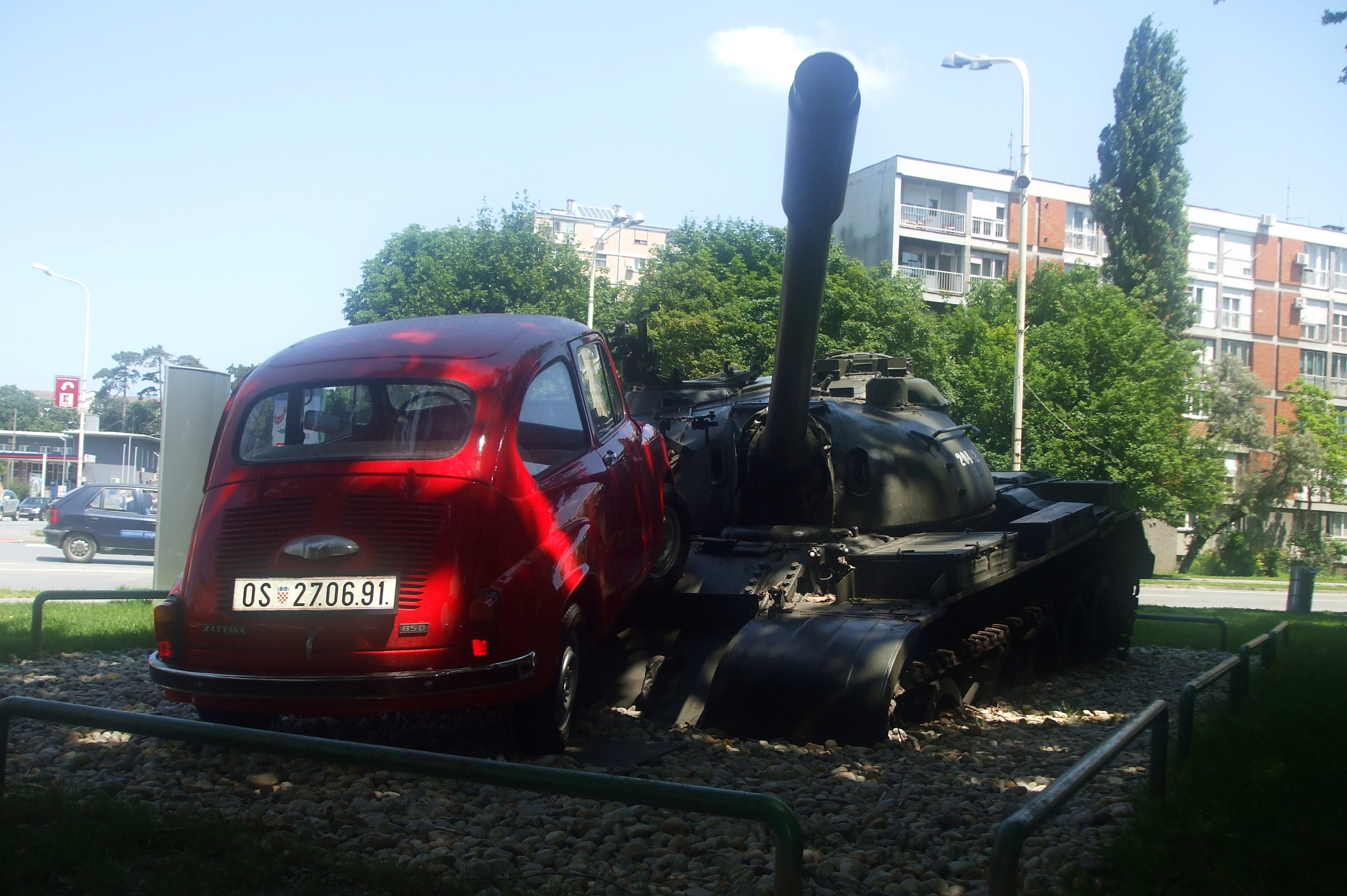
View of the back of the car

The sculpture consists of a T-55 main battle tank tilted forward, with the front part of the tracks partially buried, facing a red Zastava 750 small car whose front wheels rest on top of the tank, as if the car was about to run over it. The car bears the symbolic registration plate OS 27.06.91 consisting of the two-letter city code for Osijek and the date of the event that the monument commemorates: 27 June 1991.

The monument was inaugurated at the intersection on 27 June 2011, on the 20th anniversary of the event and on Osijek's veterans' day. The idea of showing the car triumphing over the tank came from a committee of war veterans. The monument memorialises the Croatian resistance against Yugoslavia and is a site of remembrance for those that died in the war. On the evening before the Day of Remembrance of the Victims of the Homeland War residents light candles at the monument.

In October 2011 the Fićo was vandalised, with its back window broken and bonnet dented; it was repaired and CCTV cameras installed at the site. To mark the Croatian football team finishing second in the 2018 FIFA World Cup the Fićo was painted in the white and red checks of the national team's strip.

== See also ==
- Tank Man
