= Compañía Colombiana Automotriz =

Compañia Colombiana Automotriz S.A.
- Company type: Private
- Industry: Automotive Assembly
- Founded: 1982, Colombia
- Defunct: 30 april 2014
- Headquarters: Bogotá D.C., Colombia
- Key people: Fabio Arturo Sanchez
- Products: Cars
- Parent: Mazda
- Website: www.mazda.com.co

Compañía Colombiana Automotriz S.A. was a car factory based in Bogotá, Colombia. Founded in the early 1960s as Leonidas Lara e Hijos, it assumed its current name with the beginning of its association with Fiat in 1973. They have manufactured various cars under license, including vehicles from Willys Overland, Fiat, Zastava, Polski Fiat, Peugeot, and Mitsubishi.

== History ==
The origins of the Compañia Colombiana Automotriz go back to the 1960s, when Leonidas Lara and his family acquired a warehouse which would become the main headquarters, but was initially known as the assembly plant for the Willys marketed in Colombia at the time.

In 1968, CCA contracted with Peugeot for the assembly of vehicles, which lasted until 1969. In 1973 a contract with Fiat was signed for the assembly of automobiles of the brand and partners. In the same year, the sons of Leonidas Lara renamed the company Compañía Colombiana Automotriz. In 1982, Mazda began to acquire the main partnership rights from Fiat.

In 1983, the company established a partnership with Mazda, who until 2014 owned 100% of the company, and began the production of its first automobile, the Mazda 323. It later produced the Mazda B-2000, and the Mazda 626 by 1984. From 1983 until 2014 vehicles like the Mazda Allegro, Mazda 3, Mazda 6, Mazda BT-50 and Ford Ranger twins were produced for the South American market, including its largest market, Venezuela, which in the first nine months of 1983 purchased about 12,000 units. CCA also assembles the Allegro, based on the Mazda Protege. In October 2007 the Venezuelan government imposed an import quota of 4,000 CCA vehicles which had an adverse effect on the company given that 50% of its sales are directed to the Venezuelan market.

The company previously produced on its assembly line, Mazda, Mitsubishi and Ford vehicles. However, poor sales for the Mazda brand in Colombia and the construction of a Mazda plant in Mexico, led to Mazdas being imported to Colombia from the Mazda Mexico Company.

== Chronology ==
- 1982

In 1982 the Compañia Colombiana Automotriz S.A. (CCA) then owner, Salomon Kassin flew to japan, talked with companies to produce in Colombia. He stayed with and introduced the Mazda brand in the Colombian market, hoping to capitalize on Japan's growing reputation for technological advancement and quality in their production. Sumitomo Co. and Mazda Motor Co. that year became shareholders of the CCA with 15% each, ensuring the establishment of the Mazda brand in Colombia. Thus began the production of brand vehicles with Japanese financial, technological, and trade support.

- 1983

With the beginning of assembly of Mazda vehicles in Colombia, the CEC launched the Mazda B-1600 pickup truck, and the B-Series van in October. In December, CCA released to the public the Mazda 323 and Mazda 323 Notchback hatchback models.

- 1984 - 1985

In May 1984, the company launched the Mazda 626 L. In July the Mazda 626 Mazda 626 LX and GLX models were launched. The first-generation Mazda 626 appeared in Japanese Challenge showcases promoting its engines (1.8 and 2.0 liters respectively). A commercial finance company, Financiera SA Mazdacrédito, was established to provide financing services to the related dealer network.

- 1986

Introduced the new Mazda 323, with softer lines and contours, available in NX versions (taxi), HS, NT and NS, with engines of 1.3 and 1.5 liters. The Mazda 626 also saw a new edition called the New Breed, with increased engine displacement to 2.0 liters for the LX and a sharper body design profile. Assembly of the Mazda B-2000 pickup begins. In August electrical engineer José Fernando Isaza was named by the government as president of the CCA.

- 1987

In February, the customer service hotline handles 2,626,323 calls to address and resolve concerns. At the end of July, the CEC Mazda consolidates the market with a 36% stake.

- 1990

On July 10, 1990 the production plant produced its 100,000th Mazda in Colombia. Sumitomo Co. and Mazda Motor Co. acquire 100% of the shares of the CCA.

- 1991

Mazda Leasing Company S.A. was established, which fulfills one of the goals of the company to provide a financial mechanism to facilitate the purchase and lease of vehicles. The national government started implementing the policy of opening up imports as part of an Andean regional integration plan. MX-5, MPV, minivan, and truck models begin to be imported from Japan. First enty into the international export market begins with the first trucks exported to Venezuela.

- 1994

Launched the 929, MX-6, 323, and 626 Astina Matsuri; these vehicles were assembled locally .

- 1995

Launched the Allegro 1.6 and 1.8 liter models. Allegro was available in notchback and hatchback versions. By October of that year, the B-Series Crew Cab was launched.

- 2000

In early 2000, the CCA introduced the updated 626 to the Colombian and Venezuelan market. The new Mazda B-Series, assembled in-house, was introduced in single and double cab editions with 2.2 and 2.6 liter engines, both in 4x2 and 4x4.

- 2001

Mazda 626 was equipped with security systems and ABS Air Bag. Mazda 323 versions also received improvements, including addition of a tachometer and rear seat belts on all versions.

- 2006

On January 30, a Mazda6 was the 350,000th unit assembled on the production line. Ford and Mitsubishi vehicles were also assembled by CCA, including the Ford Laser, Ford Ranger, Mitsubishi Montero and the Mitsubishi Bus 639. Mazda 626 production ends after 22 years of production (1984-2006), with a total of 70.140 units assembled for Colombia, Ecuador and Venezuela. José Fernando Isaza retired in April after 20 years of service with the company, succeeded by Fabio Arturo Sanchez.

- 2007

Launch of the Mazda CX-7, Mazda CX-9, and the Mazda BT-50 pickup. LS-50 is the first truck model rolling out from CCA's new facility for commercial vehicles.

- 2008

Launch of new Mazda2 in April.

- 2014

Main assembly plant closed. Vehicles are now imported from Mazda Mexico facilities.

== Models ==
=== List of Mazda imported vehicles (currently) ===
Automobiles

- Mazda 2
- Mazda 3
- Mazda 6

Pickups

- Mazda BT-50 / Ford Ranger

SUV

- Mazda CX-7
- Mazda CX-9

=== List of produced vehicles by Mazda brand ===
==== Automobile formerly production ====
Automobiles

- Mazda 2
- Mazda 2 Sedan All-New
- Mazda 3
- Mazda 3 All-New
- Mazda 6
- Mazda 323
- Mazda 626
- Mazda 323 Allegro

Pickups

- Mazda B-Series
- Mazda BT-50 / Ford Ranger

Towner trucks

- Mazda T-Series

=== List of vehicles assembled by other brands ===
==== Fiat ====
- Fiat 600
- Fiat 124
- Fiat 128
- Fiat 147
- Fiat 131
- Fiat OM 70
- Fiat 673N

==== Polski Fiat ====
- Polski Fiat 126p
- Polski Fiat 125p
- Polski Fiat 131p

==== Ford ====
- Ford Laser
- Ford Ranger

==== Mitsubishi ====
- Mitsubishi Montero first generation (1983 - 1997)
- Mitsubishi Montero second generation (1998 - 2006)

==== Crvena Zavodi Zastava ====
- Zastava 1300
- Fiat 750Z
- Zastava 128

==== Peugeot ====
- Peugeot 404

==== Willys ====
- Willys/Jeep CJ-5
- Willys/Jeep CJ-3B
