= Fiat 600 =

Italian car manufactured from 1955 to 1969

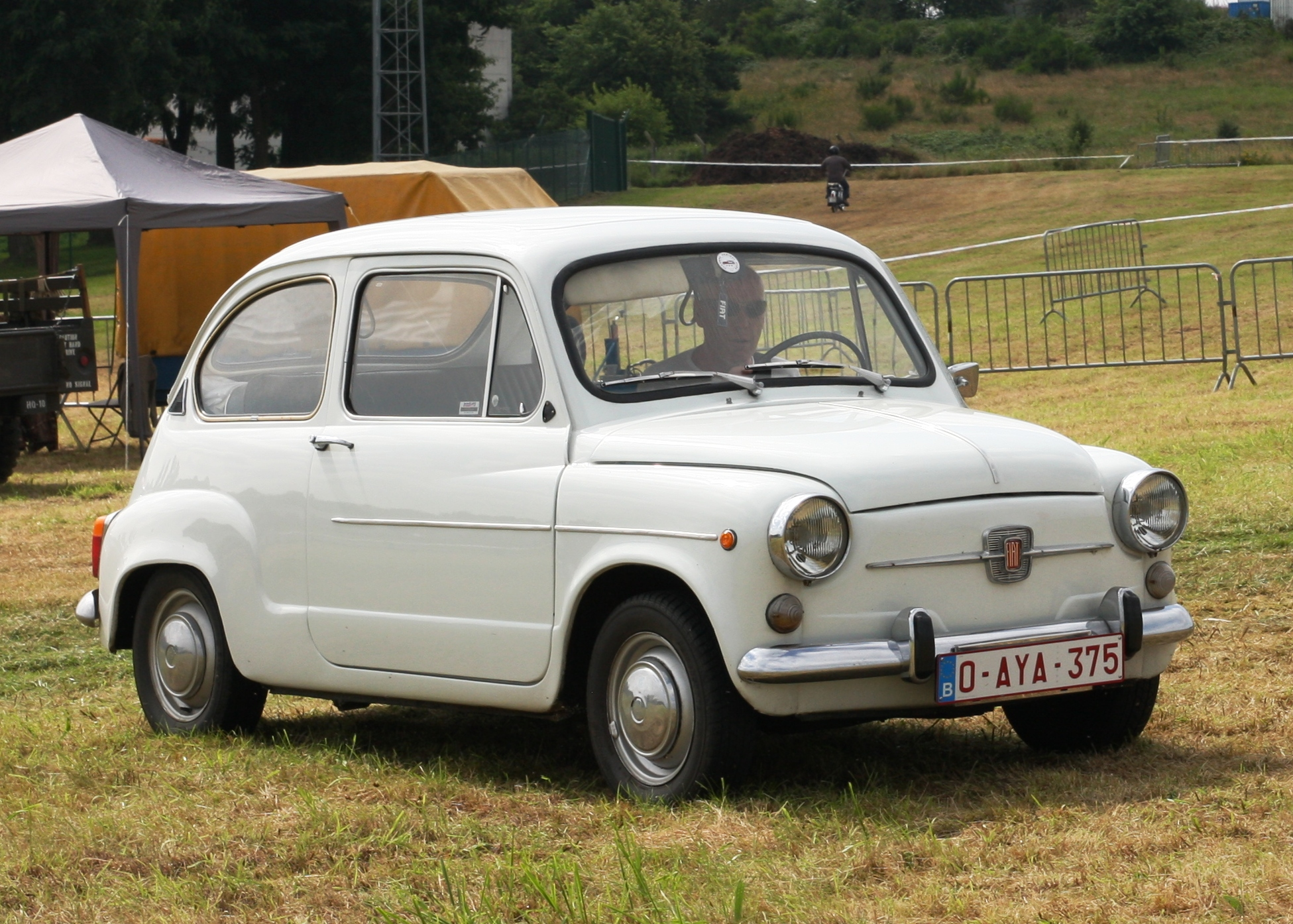

Overview
- Manufacturer: Fiat
- Also called: Fiat 770; NSU-Fiat Jagst 600/770 Neckar Jagst 600/770
- Production: 1955–1972 (Italy); 1955–1985 (Yugoslavia; Zastava); 1957–1973 (Spain; SEAT); 1960–1982 (Argentina; Fiat Concord / Sevel); 1979–1982 (Colombia)
- Assembly: Italy: Turin; Argentina: Caseros; Australia; Austria: Graz (Steyr Puch); Chile: Rancagua; Colombia: Bogotá (CCA) (Note: Built as the Zastava 750.); Malaysia: Johor Bahru (KPKK); Spain: Barcelona (Zona Franca); Uruguay: Montevideo (Ayax); West Germany: Heilbronn (NSU Automobil AG); Yugoslavia: Kragujevac
- Designer: Dante Giacosa

Body and chassis
- Class: City car (A)
- Body style: 2-door saloon 4-door mini MPV (600 Multipla)
- Layout: Rear-engine, rear-wheel-drive
- Related: Fiat 850; SEAT 600; Zastava 750

Powertrain
- Engine: 633 cc Tipo 100 OHV I4; 767 cc Tipo 100 D OHV I4; 843 cc Tipo 100 R7.038 OHV I4 (600S)
- Transmission: 4-speed manual

Dimensions
- Wheelbase: 2,000 mm (78.7 in)
- Length: 3,215 mm (126.6 in)
- Width: 1,380 mm (54.3 in)
- Height: 1,405 mm (55.3 in)
- Kerb weight: 585 kg (1,290 lb)

Chronology
- Predecessor: Fiat 500 "Topolino"
- Successor: Fiat 850, Fiat 127, Fiat 133

The Fiat 600 (Italian: Seicento, pronounced [ˌsɛiˈtʃɛnto]) is a small, rear-engined city car and economy family car made by Italian carmaker Fiat from 1955 to 1969 — offered in two-door fastback sedan and four-door Multipla mini MPV body styles. The 600 is considered a pop icon of the Italian economic miracle, and the three-row seating Multipla, though diminutive and odd-looking, is seen as one of the first mass-produced minivans.

Measuring just 3.22 m (10 ft 7 in) long, its all-new design was Fiat's first rear engined car, and was priced at 590,000 lire (the equivalent of about €8,680 or US$9,440 in 2023). The total number produced from 1955 to 1969 at the Mirafiori plant in Turin was 2,695,197.

The 1955 Fiat 600 also formed the blueprint for an even smaller sibling, the 2.97 m (9 ft 9 in) 2nd generation "Nuova" (New) Fiat 500, launched two years later – which was, although rounder in shape, largely copied from the 600's layout and design. Later, the 600's platform also formed the basis for the larger 850 saloon, coupé and spider, launched from 1964, which coexisted with the 600 in Fiats line-up for five years, until the 600 was cancelled.

During the 1950s, 1960s, 1970s, and 1980s, many units were built under licence in countries such as Spain (as SEAT 600), where it became the cultural icon of the Spanish miracle and where it was nicknamed Seiscientos; Argentina, where it was nicknamed Fitito (a diminutive: "little Fiat") and former Yugoslavia where it was nicknamed Fića or Fićo (pronounced 'fee-cha' or 'fee-cho' respectively).

Fiat replaced their 500 and 600 with the 126 and 127 models, featuring much more modern, but again very similar styling, however where the 126 carried over much of the 500's underpinnings, the 127 was an all new, slightly more expensive design with a front-engine, front-wheel-drive layout, and possibly a rear hatch. But in Spain, SEAT chose to develop a more affordable successor, the 1974 SEAT 133, updated with a similarly modernised body and interior, but largely reusing the Fiat 600 platform. For a while, Fiat also sold it as the Fiat 133, a cheaper alternative to the 127.

== Development ==
Codenamed Progetto 100 ("Project 100"), the Fiat 600 mirrored the layout of the Volkswagen Beetle and Renault 4CV of its era. Aimed at being an economical but capable vehicle, its design parameters stipulated a weight of around 450 kg with the ability to carry 4 people and luggage with a cruising speed of no less than 85 km/h. A total of 5 prototypes were built between 1952 and 1954, which all differed from each other. Chassis number 000001 with engine number 000002 is believed to be the sole remaining example, according to a recent report by Quattroruote's "Ruoteclassiche" vintage division. It was powered by an innovative single-cam V2-cylinder engine designed to simplify maintenance and did not feature a clutch pedal. At the official launch in 1955, FIAT engineer, Dante Giacosa declared that the aim had been to create something new, both in the interest of progress and simplification. This prototype, however, did not become the chosen design.

== Characteristics ==
The car had hydraulic drum brakes on all four wheels. Suspension was a single double-mounted leafspring—which acts as a stabilizer—between the front wheels coupled to gas-charged shock absorbers, and an independent coil-over-shock absorber setup coupled to semi-trailing arms at the rear. All 600 models had 3-synchro (no synchro on 1st) 4-speed transaxles. Unlike the Volkswagen Beetle or Fiat 500, the Fiat 600 is water-cooled with an ample cabin heater and, while cooling is generally adequate, for high-power modified versions a front-mounted radiator or oil cooler is needed to complement the rear-mounted radiator. All models of the 600 had generators with mechanical external regulators.

The Fiat 600 had an all-new engine, tipo 100, which would eventually have a career of 45 years. The top speed ranged from 95 km/h (59 mph) empty with the 633 cc inline-four engine to 110 km/h (68 mph) with the 767 cc version.

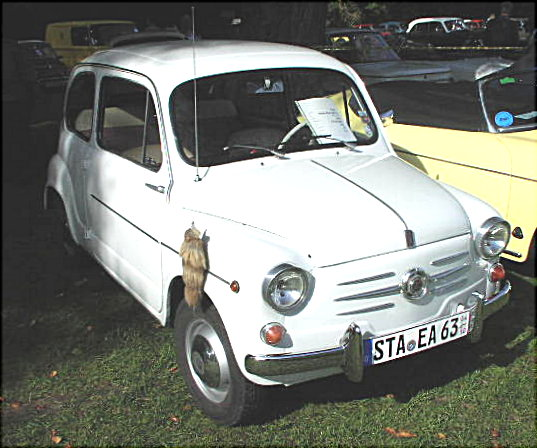
Steyr Fiat 600

A year after its debut, in 1956, a soft-top version was introduced, as well as a six-seater variant—the Fiat 600 Multipla. It was a precursor of current multi-purpose vehicles.

The millionth 600 was produced in February 1961, less than six years after the car's launch. At the time when the millionth car was produced, the manufacturer reported it was producing the car at the then remarkable rate of 1,000 a day. As of mid 2017 there were 78 registered as taxed for road use in the UK and 44 registered as SORN (Statutory Off Road Notification).

== Foreign production ==
=== SEAT 600/800 ===
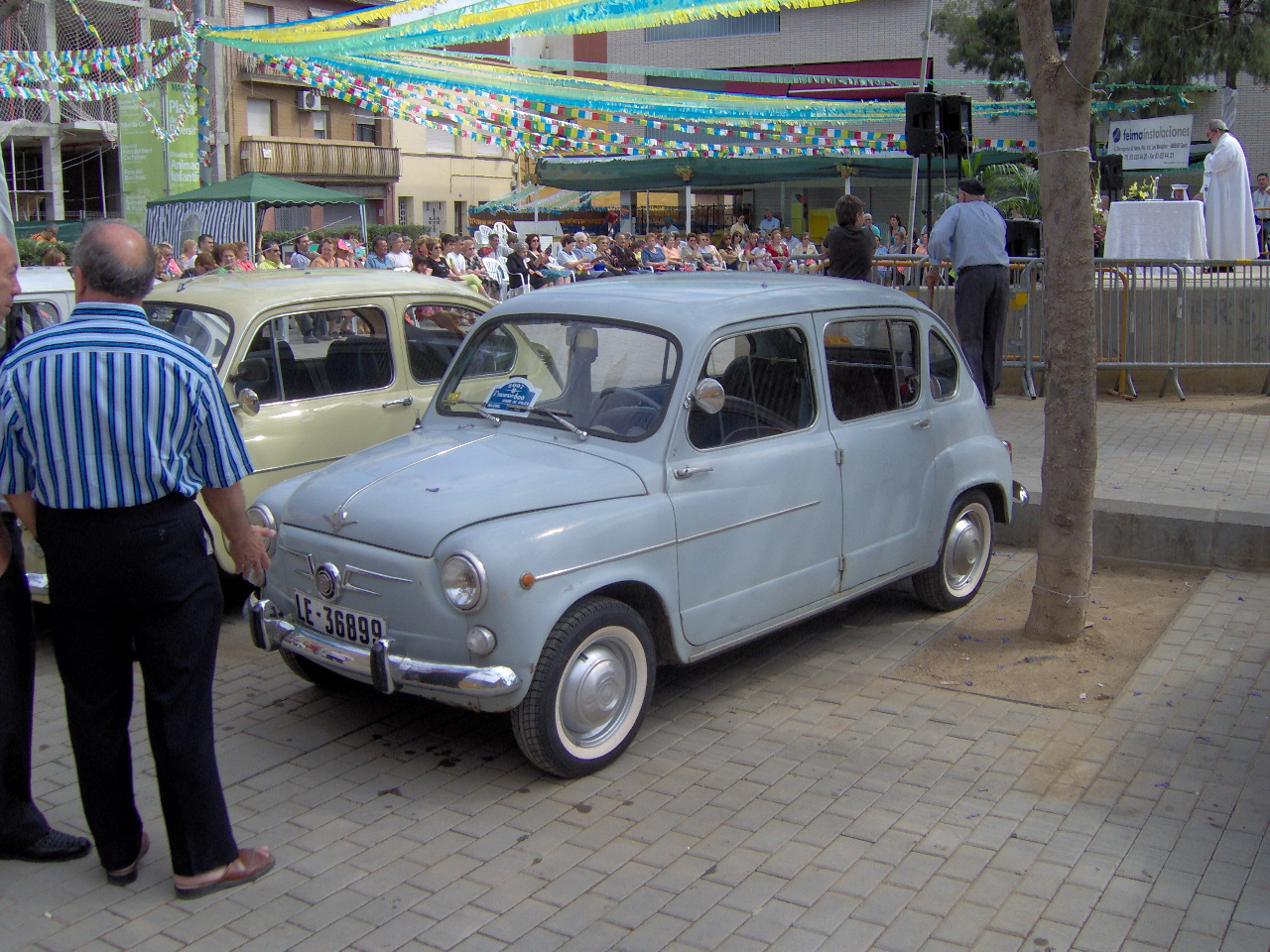
SEAT 800, the sole four-door derivative

In Spain, the 600 model was made under the make of SEAT from 1957 to 1973. Up to 797,319 SEAT 600 were made at time, and the Spanish car maker exported them to a number of countries worldwide.

SEAT produced various derivatives of the original 600 model some of them with improvements and special fittings like the use of "suicide doors": the SEAT 600 D/E/L Especial an luxury version, the 'Descapotable' cabriolet, the 'Formicheta' commercial version, the 'Múltiple', the 'Savio', the 'Playera', etc.

One unique variation produced between 1964 and 1967 was the SEAT 800, the sole four-door derivative of the 600 model which received a longer wheelbase. It was developed in-house by SEAT and produced exclusively by the Spanish automaker without any equivalent model in Fiat's range.

In addition, in Spain many car bodybuilders or companies associated with SEAT, manufactured several versions derived from the 600: '750 Primavera', 'Rany', 'Milton', 'Serra', 'Gredos', 'Avia 50', 'Buggy', 'Siata Minivan', 'Siata Tarraca', etc.

The SEAT 600 was the most popular car in Spain of the twentieth century, because it was the first car that any Spaniard could buy and served to definitively motorize the country. It is a fundamental element of the well-known "Spanish miracle", the great industrial development that occurred in the 60s during the Government of General Franco. This great development transformed the country from an agriculture-based economy to the eighth industrial power in the world.

=== Fiat 600/770 Neckar Jagst ===
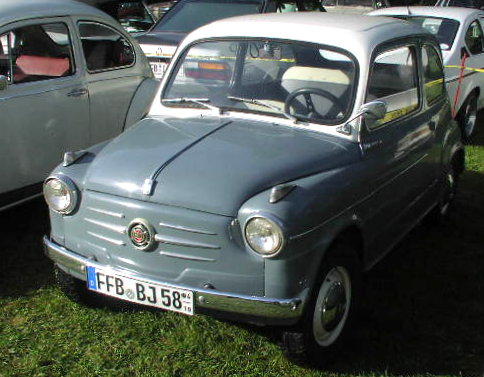
NSU Fiat Jagst

The Fiat 600 was also manufactured at Fiat Neckar in Germany between 1956 and 1967. Presented in a first time as Jagst 600, in 1960 with the release of Fiat 600D it became Jagst 770. The model was manufactured until the end of 1967, more than 172,000 copies.

=== Zastava 750/850 ===
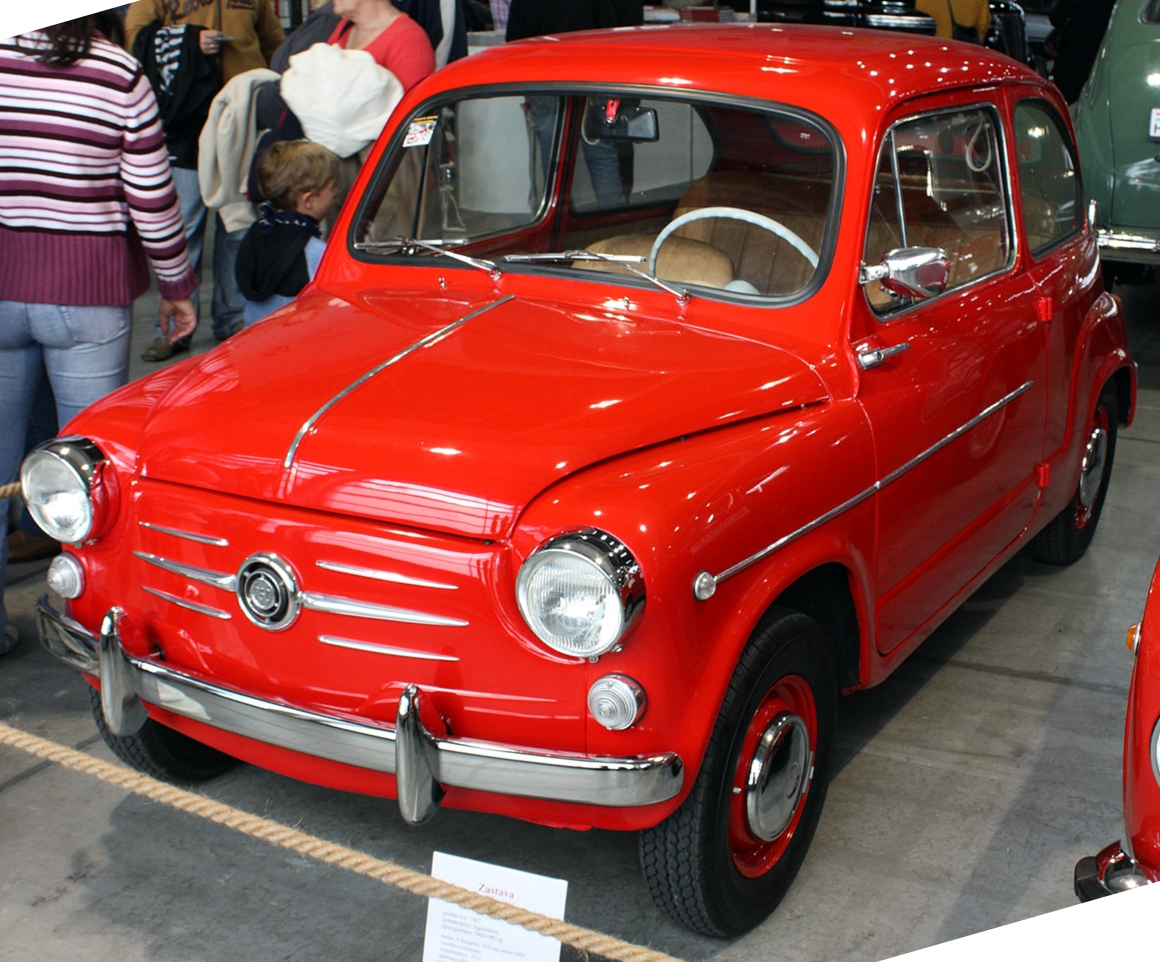
Zastava 750

In former Yugoslavia the model was much sought after, and was produced under the name Zastava 750 (later 850), nicknamed "Fića" or "Fićo" in Serbo-Croatian, "Fičo" or "Fičko" in Slovene, and "Фиќо/Фичо" (Fikjo/Ficho) in Macedonian. It was produced by the Zastava factory in Kragujevac, Serbia, from the early 1962 until 1976, during which time it played a major role in motorisation of the country, due to its affordability.

=== South American production ===
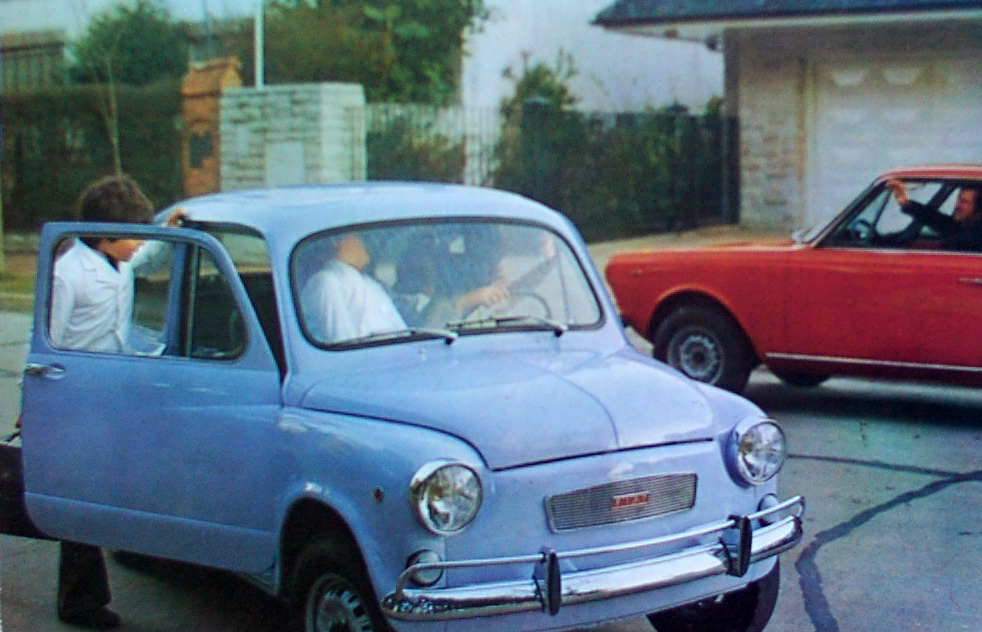
Fiat 600R built in Argentina

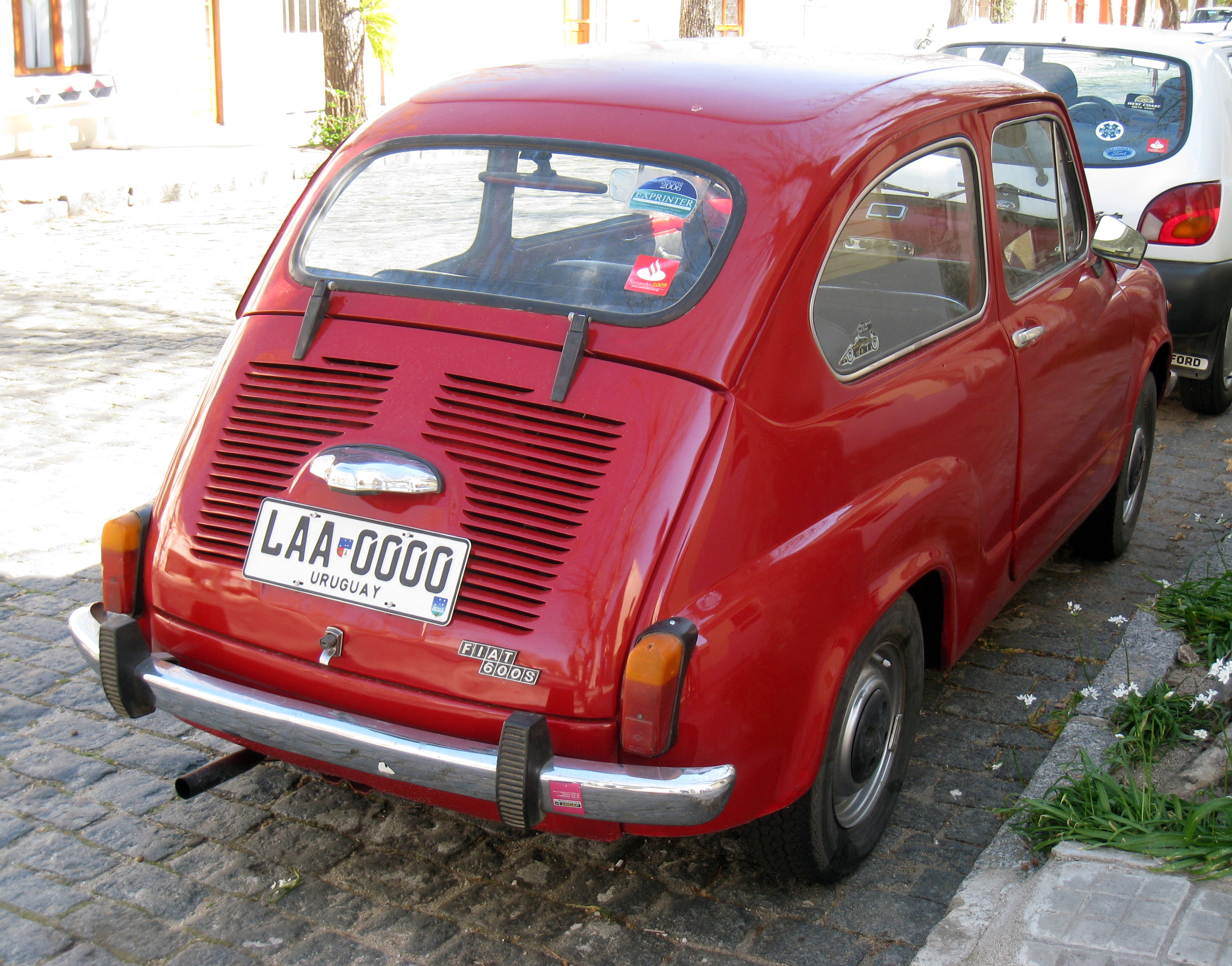
Uruguayan-built Fiat 600S

The 600 was built as the Fiat 600 R by Sevel in Argentina from 1960 to 1982, with assembly operations also taking place (beginning somewhat later) in Uruguay by Ayax S.A., and in Chile. At first, Someca S.A. built the 600 with rear-hinged doors and the 633 cc engine with 28 hp (21 kW), made mainly from parts shipped in from Italy. As a new plant was constructed in the Ferreyra, a suburb of Córdoba, the local parts content steadily increased. In 1962 the 600D was introduced, with a 32 hp SAE (24 kW) 767 cc engine. In August 1964, around the same time that the local firm changed its name to Fiat Concord S.A., the second 600D was introduced, with slight changes to its appearance. The suicide doors continued to be used until the April 1965 appearance of the 600E, which also gained some extra power. Early in 1967 the 600E received a slight facelift with bigger headlights, new rims, and a new "grille" in front.

In November 1970 the 600R appeared. The external differences were limited to trim, but the interior saw more thorough changes, with a new steering wheel, inner ceiling, and seat coverings. The hubcaps were replaced with tiny rubber caps. The 767 cc 600 R had 36 hp SAE (26 kW) thanks to higher compression than in the E, and was in turn replaced by the 32 hp DIN (24 kW) 843 cc 600 S in July 1977. The 600 S featured new bumpers with rubber overriders and a black plastic faux-grille to replace the previous chrome iteration. This version was equipped with an enlarged, 843 cc engine that could use 88 octane fuel. That engine was adapted in Córdoba from the 903 cc engine (requiring 93 octane fuel) which equipped the Spanish-sourced Fiat 133, which coexisted with the 600 S in Argentina until 1982. Top speed was up to 120 km/h (75 mph) in the 600 S. The 600 was finally replaced by the Fiat 147 in April 1982, after having undergone one last tiny facelift in 1981 (black head and taillight surrounds, a black "shield" up front). Initially, the new 147 also used the 903 cc engine.

In Colombia, it was assembled by Colombian Mazda assemblers, Compañía Colombiana Automotriz, from 1979 to 1982. Marketed as the Fiat 750Z, colloquially it was called the "topolino". Parts content was divided into 60 per cent Colombian parts and 40 per cent Serbian parts (from the Zastava 750).

== Fiat 600 Multipla ==
Fiat 600 Multipla
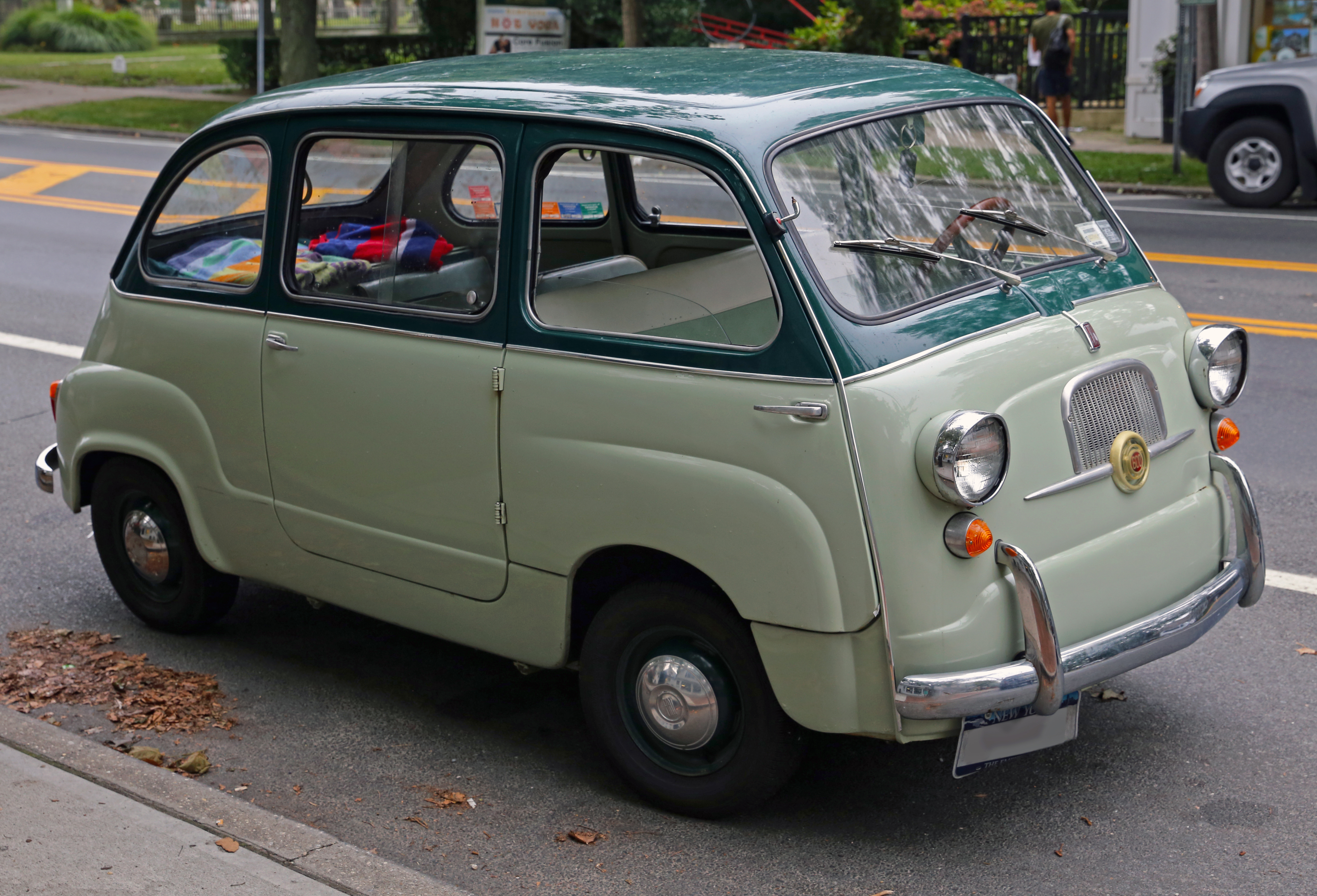

Overview
- Manufacturer: Fiat
- Also called: Cisitalia Weekend (Argentina)
- Production: 1956–1967; 240,000 units
- Designer: Dante Giacosa

Body and chassis
- Class: MPV
- Body style: 4-door MPV
- Layout: Rear-engine, rear-wheel-drive

Powertrain
- Engine: 633 cc Fiat tipo 100 I4; 767 cc Fiat tipo 100 I4
- Transmission: 4-speed manual

Dimensions
- Wheelbase: 2,000 mm (78.7 in)
- Length: 3,531 mm (139.0 in)
- Width: 1,448 mm (57.0 in)
- Height: 1,581 mm (62.2 in)
- Curb weight: 700 kg (1,543 lb)

The Fiat 600 Multipla was a four-door MPV based on the Fiat 600's drivetrain and Fiat 1100 front suspensions, that sat up to six people in a footprint just 50 cm (19.7 in) longer than the original Mini Cooper and on the same 2 m (78.7 in) wheelbase as the 600 saloon. This was achieved by moving the driver's compartment forward over the front axle, effectively eliminating the boot but giving the body a very minivan-like "one-box", flat-front look. The car debuted at the Brussels Motor Show in January 1956, and was discontinued in the spring of 1967, to be replaced by the Fiat 850 Familiare. The Multipla name was reintroduced in late 1998 for the Fiat Multipla compact minivan.

The 600 Multipla was available in three interior configurations:

- 4/5-seater version. Two rows of seats: fixed front bench seat for driver and passenger, fold-down rear bench for two or three passengers, cargo space between the rear seats and the firewall. The rear seats folded flat with the floor. Original price on the Italian market: 730,000 Lire.
- 6-seater version. Three rows of seats: fixed front bench seat for driver and passenger, plus four single rear seats in two rows. The rear seats could be individually folded flat to the floor, allowing for a reconfigurable cargo area with an even loading surface. With all six seats up storage space was reduced to the rear parcel shelf. Original price on the Italian market: 743,000 Lire.
- Taxi version, introduced at the April 1956 Turin Motor Show. It featured an individual driver seat, passenger seat which could be folded down becoming a luggage shelf, two foldaway jump seats in the middle, and a bench seat at the rear against the firewall. Original price on the Italian market: 835,000 Lire. Until the 1970s, the Multipla was widely used as a taxi in many parts of Italy.

As mentioned, the 600 Multipla used the type 100.000 663 cc overhead valve inline-four cylinder engine from the 600 saloon, producing 21.5 DIN-rated PS (15.8 kW; 21.2 hp) or 24.5 CUNA-rated PS at 4,600 rpm. A shorter final drive ratio was the only change made to the 4-speed manual transmission, with synchromesh on the top three forward gears. Rear trailing arm suspension also came from the 600, while the front double wishbone suspension—complete with coil springs, coaxial hydraulic dampers and anti-roll bar—as well as steering components were sourced from the bigger 1100/103. Other changes included a larger capacity radiator and relocating the fuel tank (which on the regular 600 was housed in the front luggage compartment) to the rear, above the gearbox. The spare wheel was carried inside the cabin, in front of the passenger seat. The manufacturer advertised a top speed of 90 km/h (56 mph).

A 633 cc, RHD Multipla was tested by the British magazine The Motor in 1956. It was found to have a top speed of 57.1 mph (91.9 km/h) and could accelerate from 0–50 mph (0–80 km/h) in 43.0 seconds. A fuel consumption of 38.4 miles per imperial gallon (7.36 L/100 km; 32.0 mpg_{‑US}) was recorded. The test car cost £799 including taxes on the UK market.

In September 1960 the 600 Multipla benefited from the same mechanical upgrades introduced on the 600 D saloon, the most significant one being an enlarged 767 cc engine, and became the 600 D Multipla. As on the saloon, the 106 D.000 four-cylinder had both larger bore and longer stroke, and produced 25 DIN-rated PS (18.4 kW; 24.7 hp) or 29 CUNA-rated PS 4,800 rpm.

=== Coachbuilt models ===
In 1956, Fissore designed an open-topped beach car prototype based on the Multipla called the "Marinella", with a wickerwork wraparound bench in the rear. Based on the 600 Multipla, Carrozzeria Coriasco produced the 600 M, a compact panel van. This led to Fiat later producing the 600 T panel van.

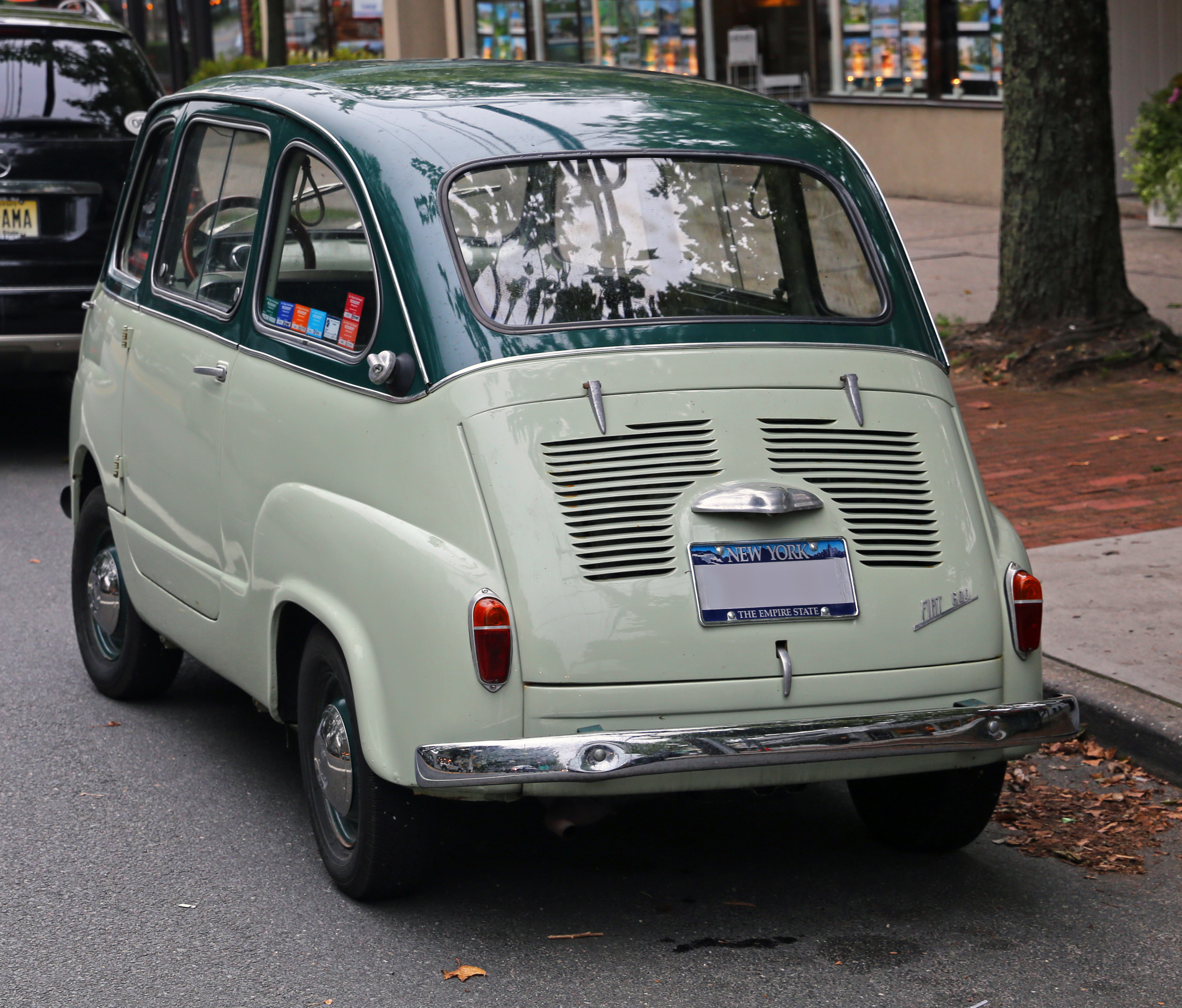
Rear view (1959)

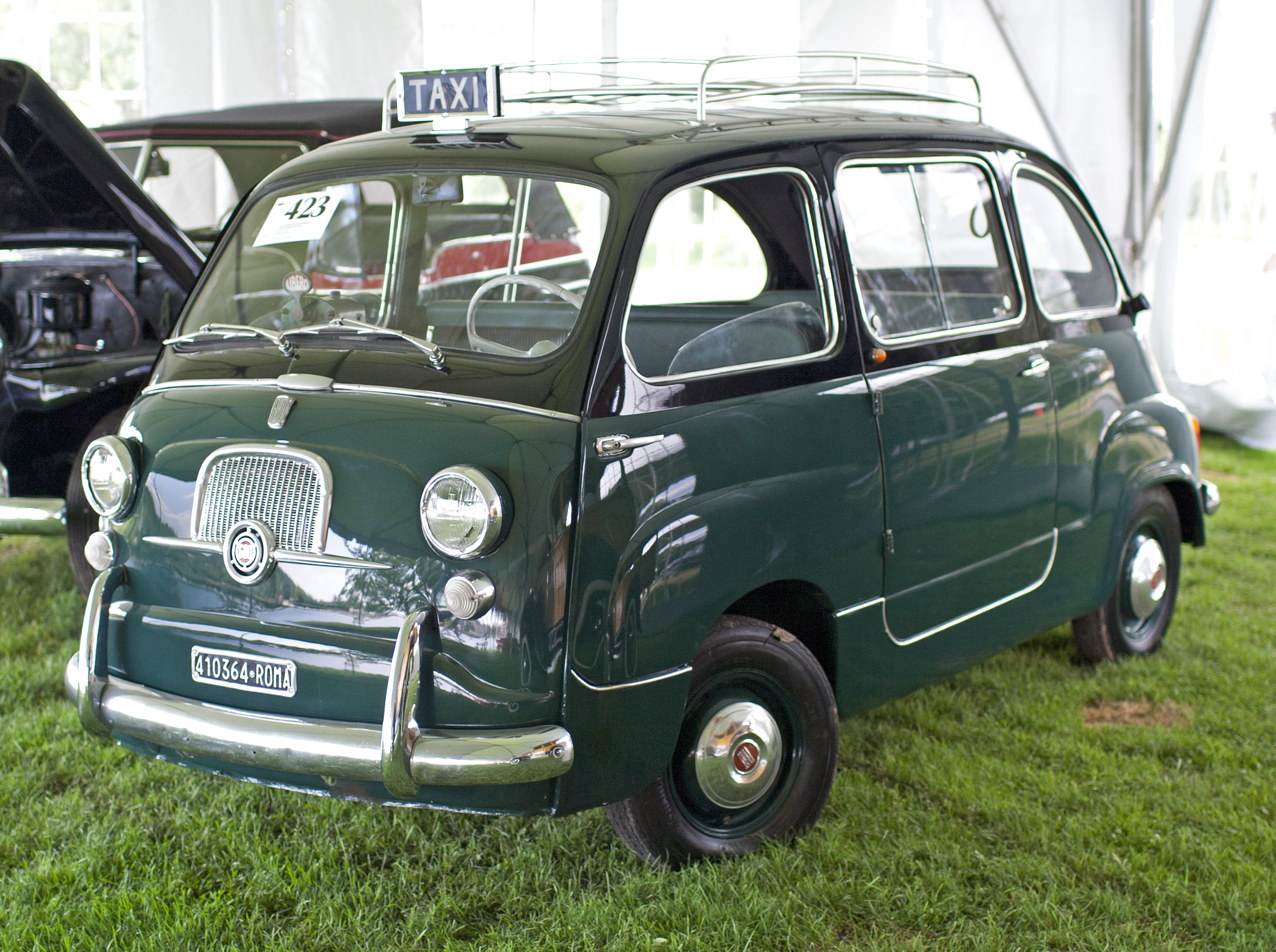
1960 Multipla in original Roman taxi livery

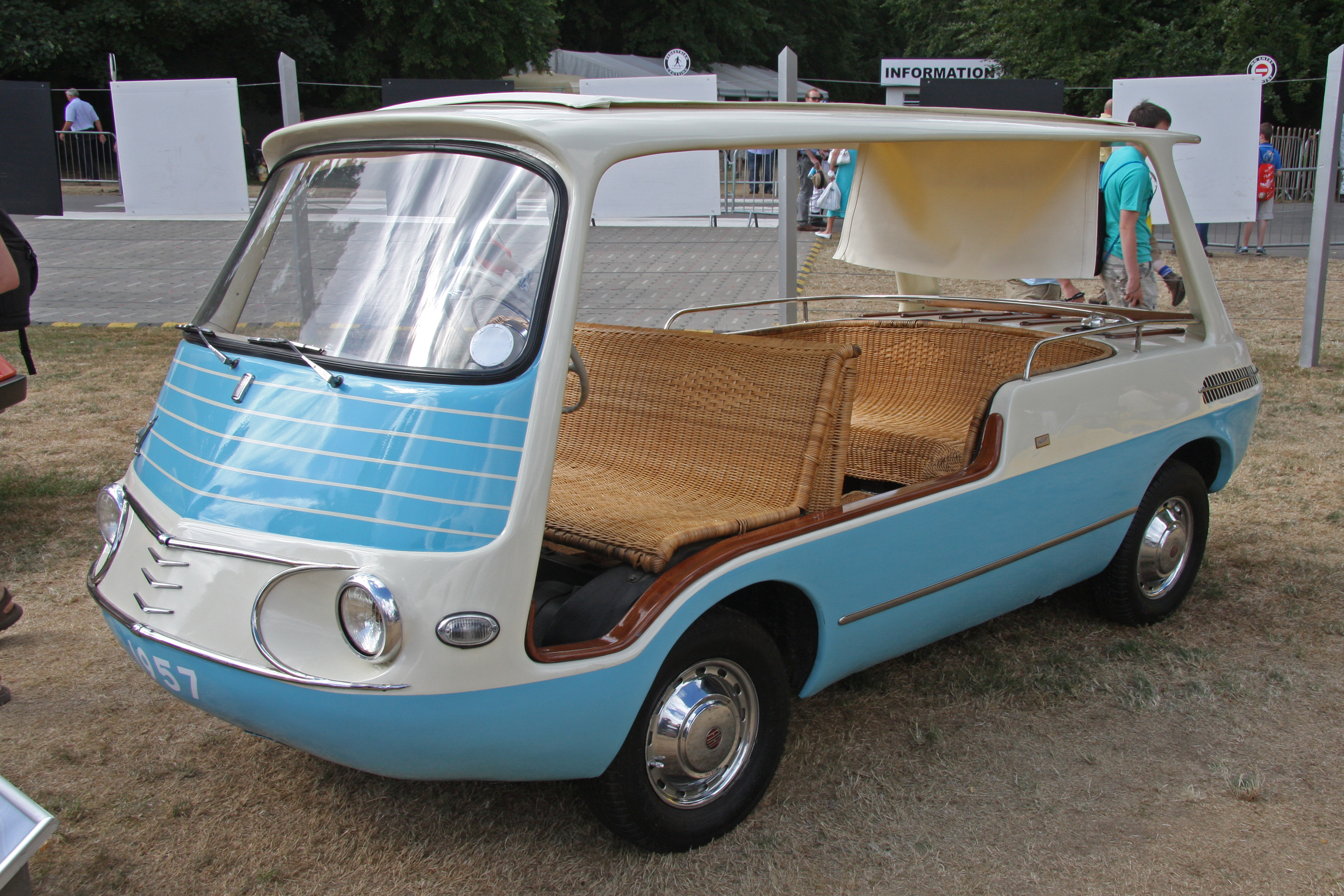
600 Multipla Marinella by Fissore

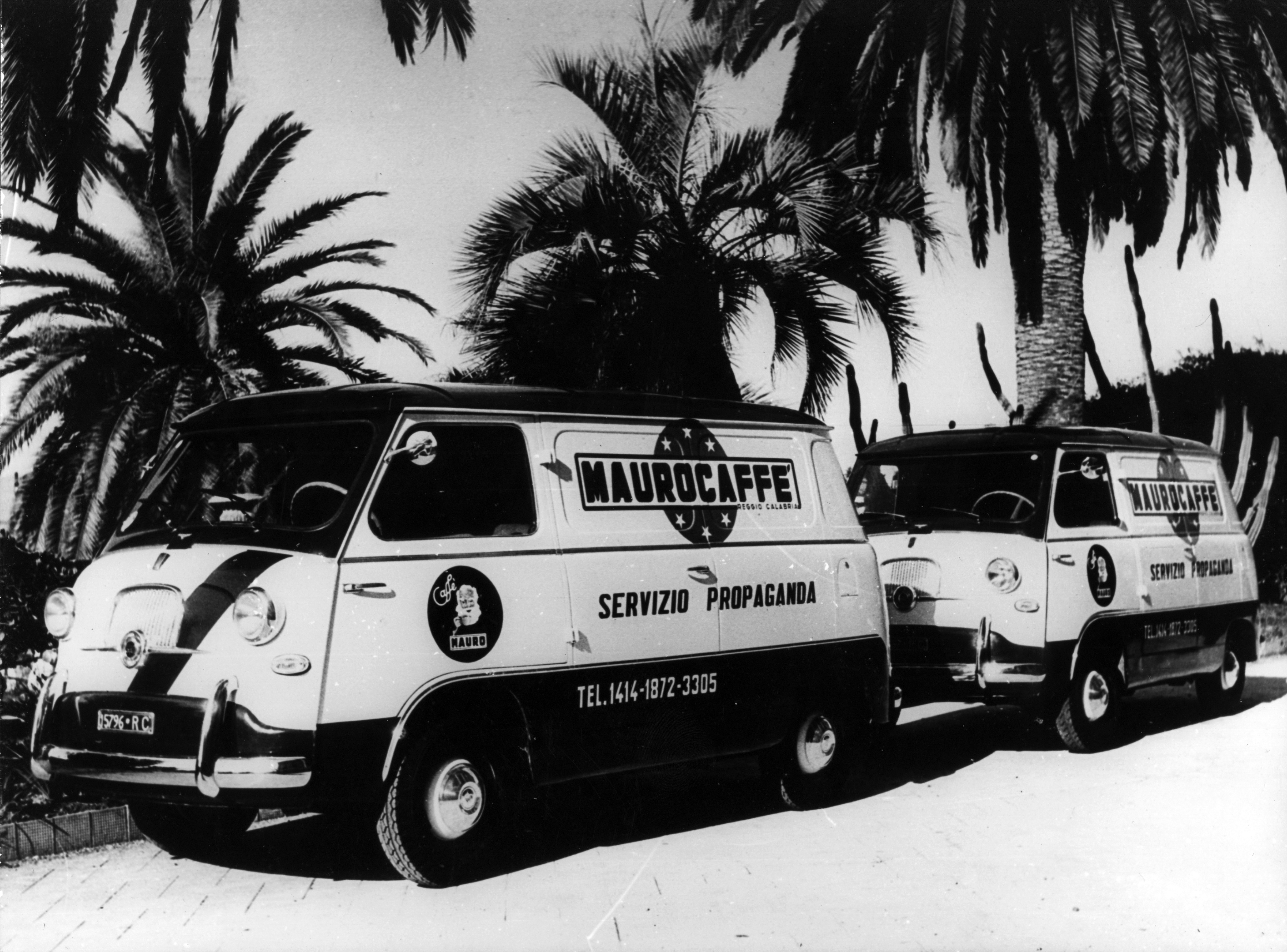
600 M Coriasco panel vans

== Fiat 600T ==
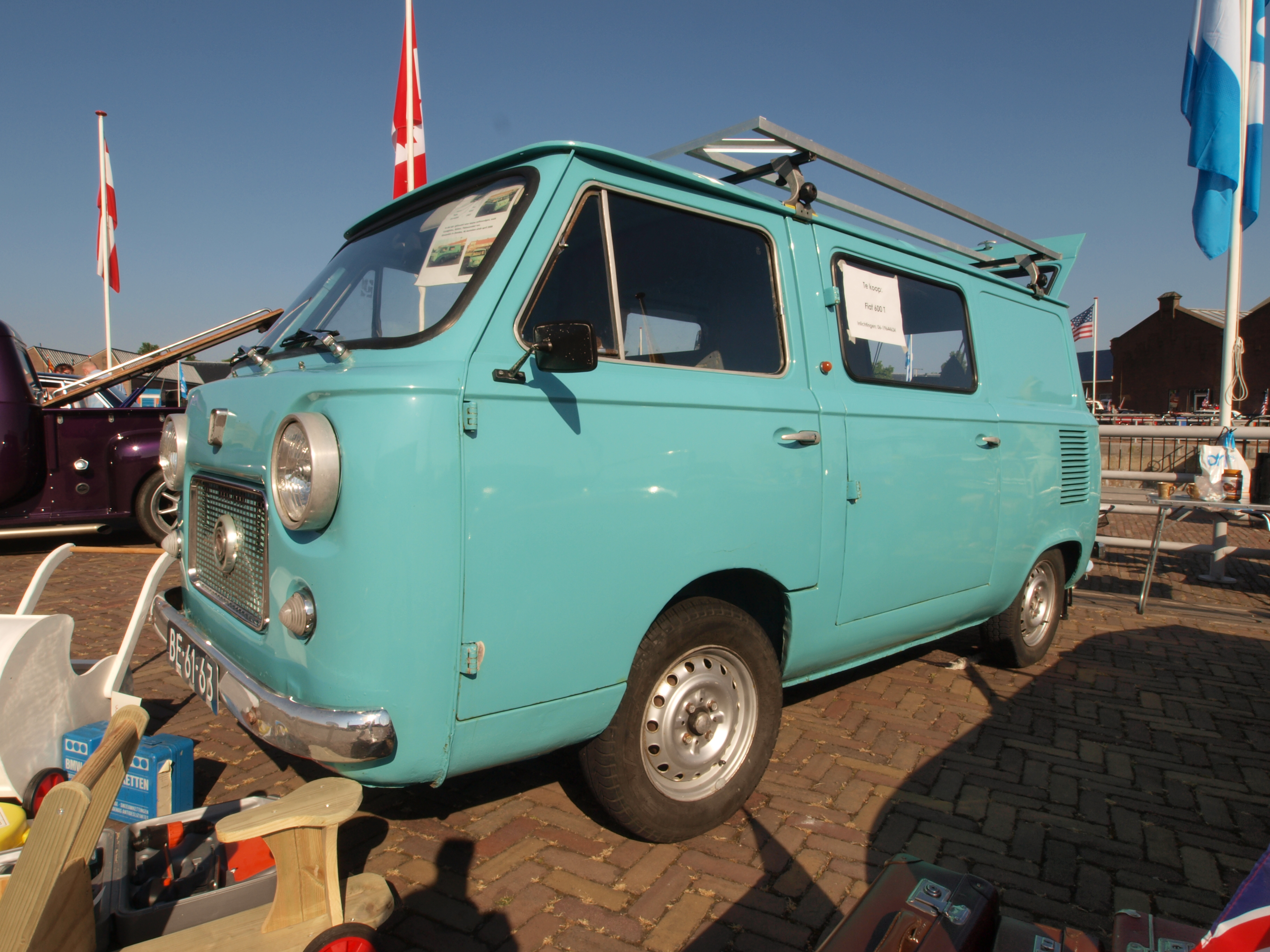
Fiat 600T, a van variant of Fiat 600 and a predecessor of the Fiat 850T

The Fiat 600T is a van derivative of the 600 Multipla. It is powered by a rear-mounted 633 cc 4-cylinder engine.

== Non-Fiat derivatives ==
=== Ghia Jolly ===
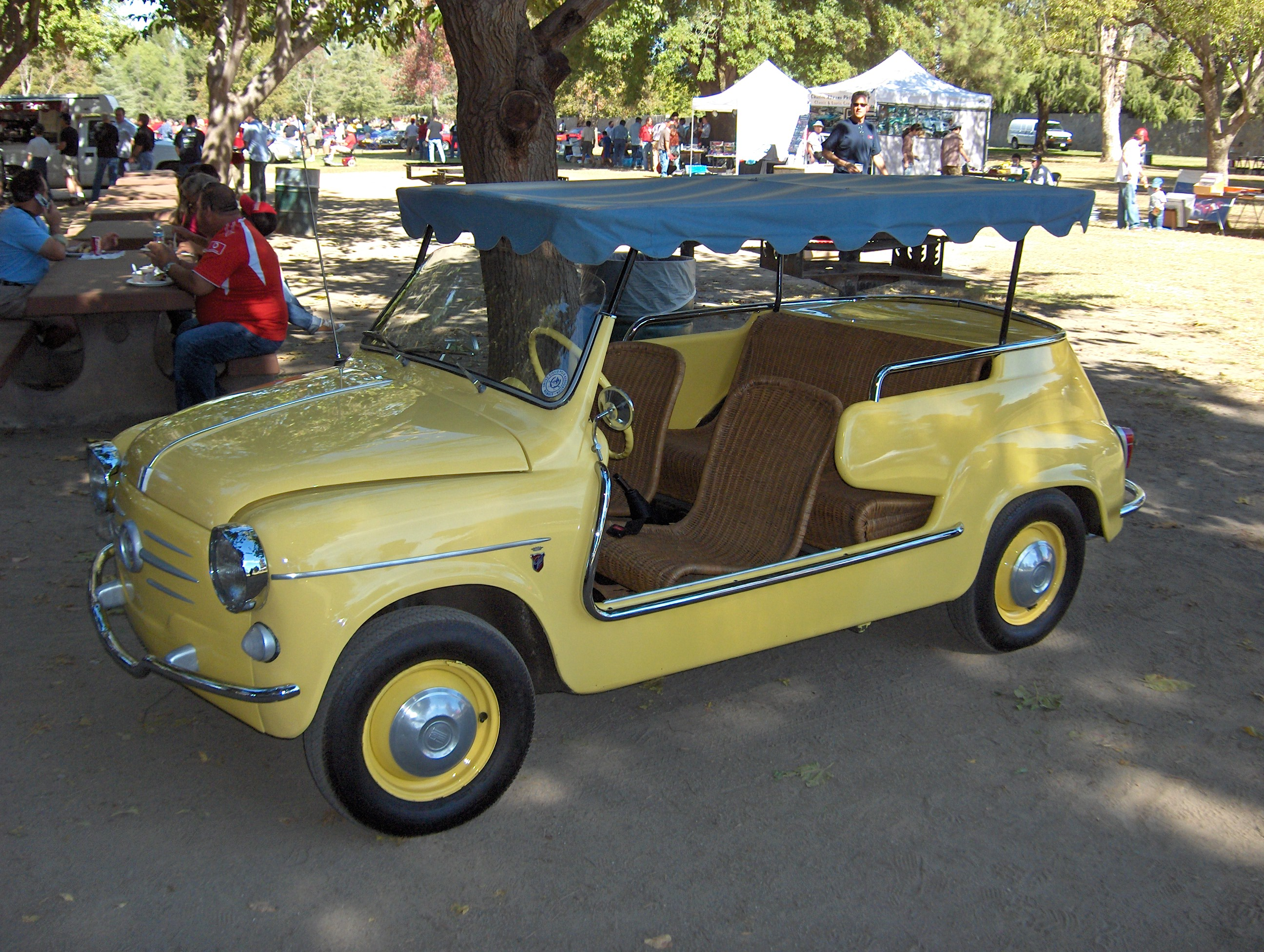
The Fiat 600 "Jolly" – with wicker seats

In 1958 Fiat shipped a number of Fiat 600s to the Italian design house Ghia for conversion into a beach car called the Jolly. Featuring wicker seats and the option of a fringed top to shield its occupants from the Mediterranean sun, these cars were originally made for use on large yachts of the wealthy (Aristotle Onassis owned one).

The car was designed as a luxury vehicle for wealthy Europeans and the US market.

With a cost of nearly double that of a standard "600", they were made in a very limited production. It is believed that fewer than 100 exist today, each one being unique. 32 Jolly cars were used as taxis on the island of Catalina off the coast of Los Angeles in the US from 1958 to 1962. Famous Fiat Jolly owners include Aristotle Onassis, Yul Brynner, Grace Kelly, Mary Pickford, Mae West, Gianni Agnelli (for whom the original Jolly was constructed), Josip Broz Tito, Wiley T. Buchanan Jr., and James Inglis. Fiat Jollys are highly sought after by collectors; however, replicas are being made and are being passed off as authentic. A genuine 1960 Fiat Jolly "600" model brought a record price of $170,500 at a collector car auction in Scottsdale, Arizona, in January 2015.

=== Abarth versions ===
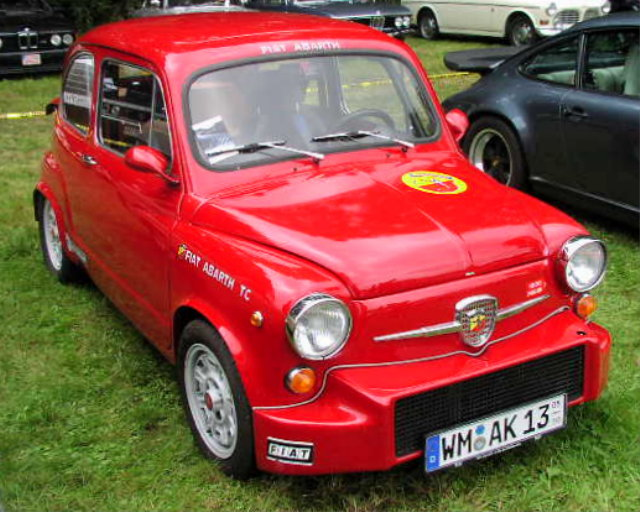
Fiat Abarth 850TC

Italian tuning company Abarth produced various versions of the Fiat 600 from 1956 to 1970 under a variety of model names, including Abarth 210 A, Fiat-Abarth 750, 850, and 1000. Many suffixes like Granturismo, Berlina, TC, and TCR were also used and many were built with aluminium bodywork by Zagato and other famed Italian carrozzerie.

Abarth competitor Giannini Automobili also produced tuned 600s (as did countless other, smaller modifiers), most famously the Giannini 750 TV, but these never had the impact that Abarth's versions did.

== Production figures ==
- Italy – Fiat: 2,695,197
- Spain – Fiat/Seat: 814,926
- Germany – Fiat Neckar: ~ 172,000
- former Yugoslavia – Zastava 600, 750 and 850: 923,487
- Argentina – Fiat Concord: 304,016
- Chile – Fiat: ~ 12,000
- World total: > 4,921,626

== Additional specifications ==
- Petrol mileage = ~ 5.7 L/100 km (50 mpg_{‑imp}; 41 mpg_{‑US}) for the 633 cc engine
- Petrol tank = ~ 7 US gal (26 L; 6 imp gal) capacity for the 1959 model
