= Ayax =

Uruguayan automobile dealer and former automobile manufacturer

Ayax S.A.
- Industry: Automotive
- Founded: 1945
- Headquarters: Montevideo, Uruguay

Ayax S.A. is an automobile dealer and former automobile manufacturer based in Montevideo, Uruguay.

== History ==
The company AYAX S.A., founded in 1945, which initially imported various laboratory products as well as textile and paper machines in addition to vehicles from the Opel and Chevrolet brands, was taken over 100% by its managing director Emilio J. Curcio in 1962. General Motors' agency was abandoned in 1968 in favor of the Fiat and Toyota brands. While the representation and assembly of Fiat vehicles was given up again, the production of Toyota vehicles was continued.

The assembly activity ended in the 1990s. The subsidiary Lucca Design, founded in 2004, works as a supplier for Toyota Argentina.

== Models ==
The Hilux model was assembled from 1971, while the Corolla and other Hilux versions (pick-up and double cabin) were added from 1985.
