= SEAT 133 =

Model series by SEAT

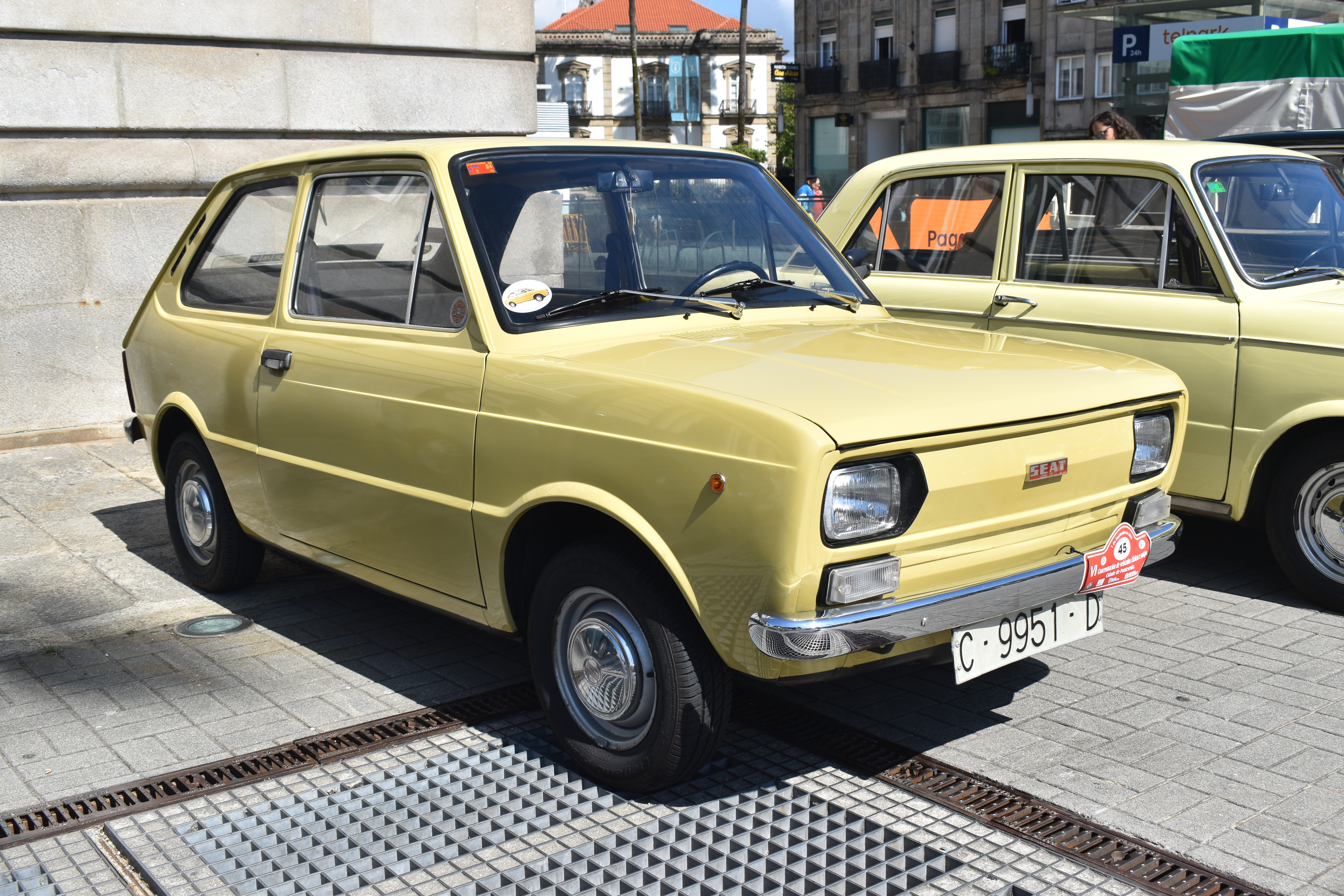

Overview
- Manufacturer: SEAT
- Also called: Fiat 133 (European exports and Latin America); Nasr 133 (Egypt)
- Production: 1974–1981 (SEAT); 1977–1982 (Sevel)
- Assembly: Spain: Barcelona (Zona Franca); Argentina: Córdoba (Fiat/Sevel); Egypt: Cairo (Nasr)

Body and chassis
- Class: City car (A)
- Body style: 2-door saloon
- Layout: RR layout
- Related: SEAT 850; Fiat 850

Powertrain
- Engine: 843 cc I4; 903 cc I4
- Transmission: 4-speed manual

Dimensions
- Wheelbase: 79.125 in (2,009.8 mm)
- Length: 135.875 in (3,451.2 mm)
- Width: 56 in (1,400 mm)
- Height: 52.25 in (1,327 mm)
- Curb weight: 690 kg (1,521 lb)

Chronology
- Predecessor: SEAT 600; SEAT 850
- Successor: SEAT Panda; Fiat Panda (European exports); Fiat 147 (Latin America)

The SEAT 133 is a small rear-engined car designed and sold by SEAT in Spain from 1974 until 1979, and until 1982 to export markets. The car used the chassis and engine of the by then defunct Fiat/SEAT 850 and featured a new body in the style of the smaller Fiat 126.

== History ==
The car was first exhibited at the Barcelona Motor Show in May 1974. It was developed by SEAT, which had signed an agreement of collaboration with Fiat in the 1950s.

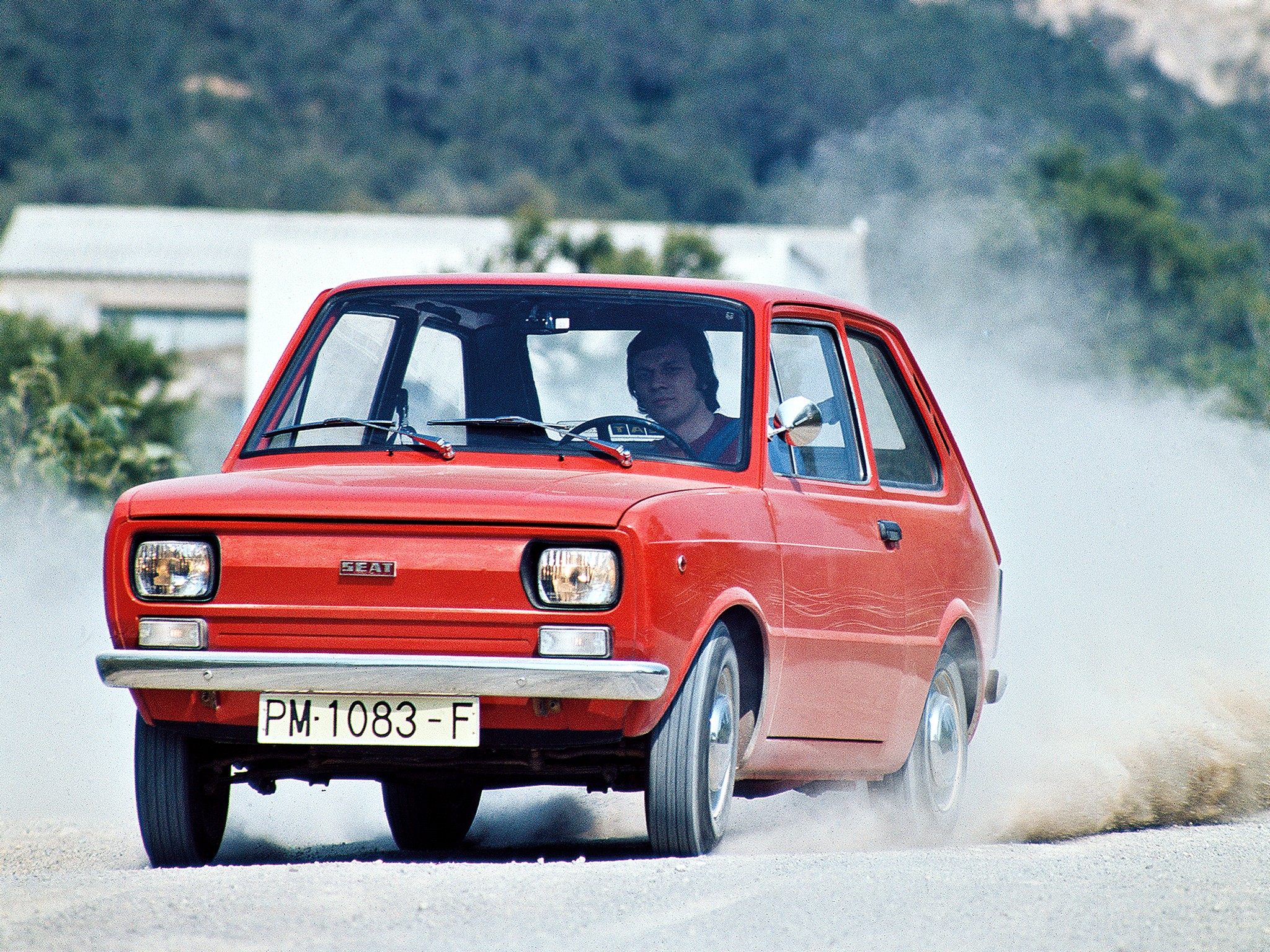
SEAT 133

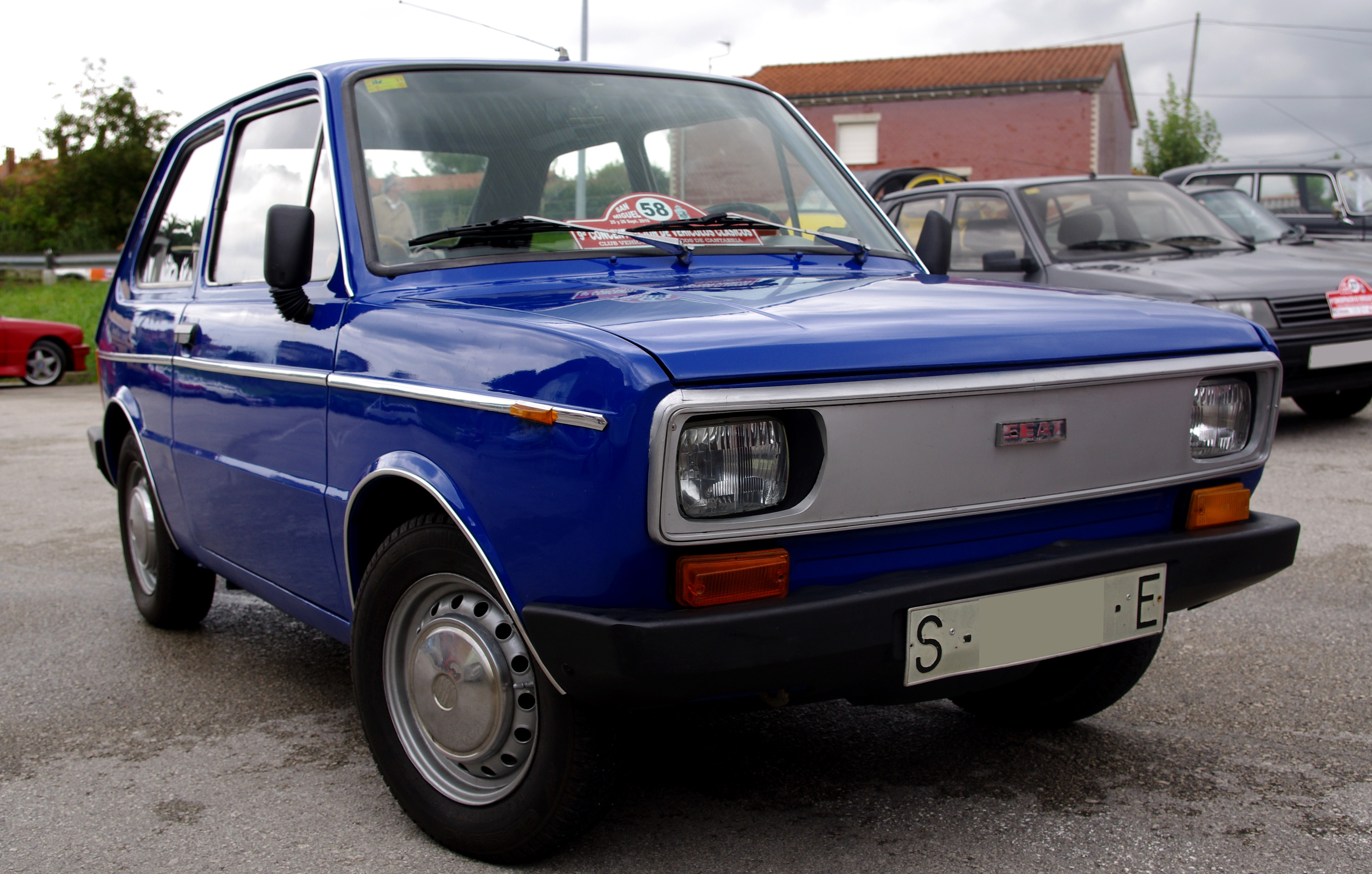
SEAT 133 L

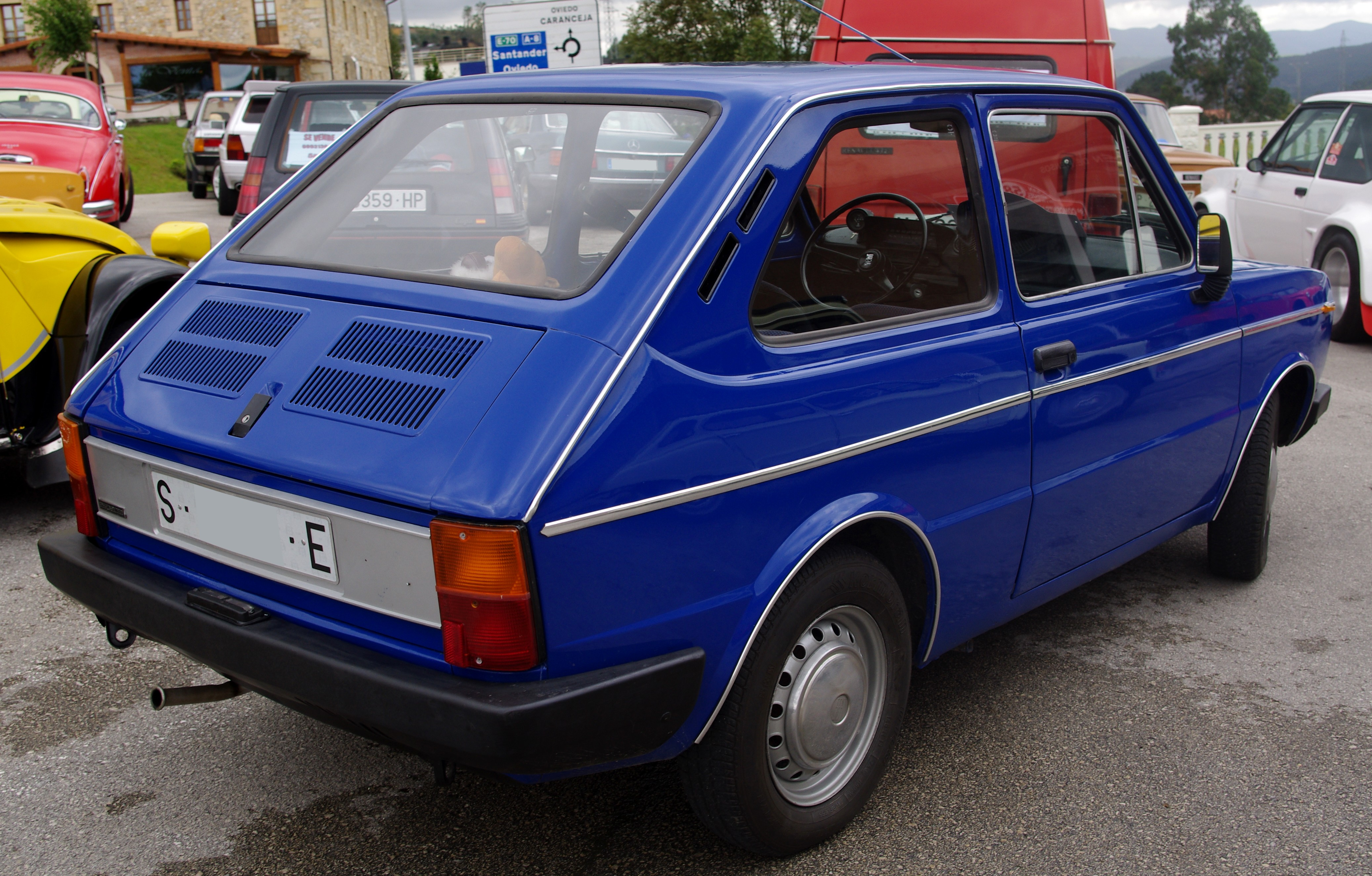
Seat 133 L (rear view)

The 133's design brief required that it be a cheap car to both develop and build, so the final product inherited most of its components from the SEAT 850 or the very closely related Fiat 850.

The 133 effectively replaced the SEAT 850 and the SEAT 600, both of which had been produced in considerable numbers with around 800,000 of the 600 built — almost exclusively for the domestic market — by 1974.

At first the 133 was mainly sold in Spain, where it did not enjoy great success since it suffered from frequent overheating problems. It was meant to replace the 600 and 850 models, and provide a means for SEAT to open new markets to make up for the loss of sales in Spain that would come with the disappearance of the restrictions on car imports during the 1970s. In the next years, export rates went up and were higher than for most of the 133's predecessors (as well as the remainder of the SEAT range), reaching 36.7 percent in 1976. Up to 200,000 SEAT 133s had been produced by 1979 in Spain.

Noteworthy at that time was the engine's compression ratio of only 8:1, which permitted the car to run on 85 octane petrol. This was still appropriate in Spain, but elsewhere in western Europe even "regular" fuel grades by now generally guaranteed a higher minimum octane rating.

Like the 850, the 133 was a rear-wheel drive, rear-engined car – a layout that was being supplanted by front-engined, front-wheel drive hatchbacks like the Renault 5 and Fiat's own Fiat 127 at the time. Due to the rear engine layout, there was just a small well for parcels behind the back seats, with more room for luggage in the front boot.

== Export markets ==
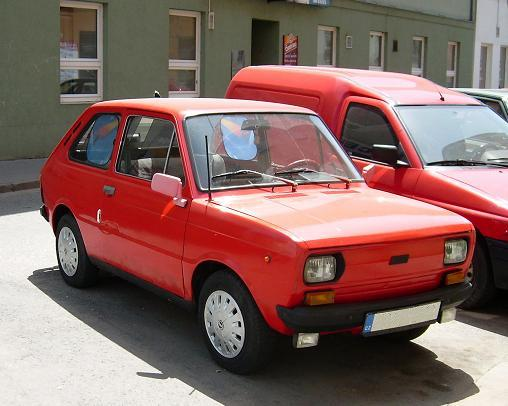
Fiat 133 (Europe)

The SEAT 133 was sold as the Fiat 133 in certain export markets where the SEAT brand was unknown. Around 127,000 units were exported, mostly under the Fiat name.

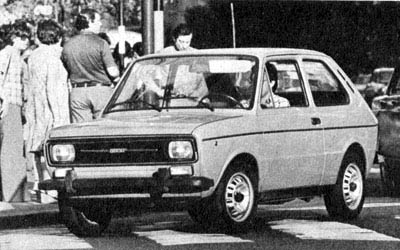
Fiat 133 (Argentina)

The SEAT 133 was exported to Germany from autumn 1974, where it found some success among rear-wheel-drive loyalists in the mid-seventies. It was also sold in Britain from June 1975. These countries had no SEAT dealership network at the time, and the cars were branded as Fiat 133s, to be marketed alongside the Fiats 126 and 127.

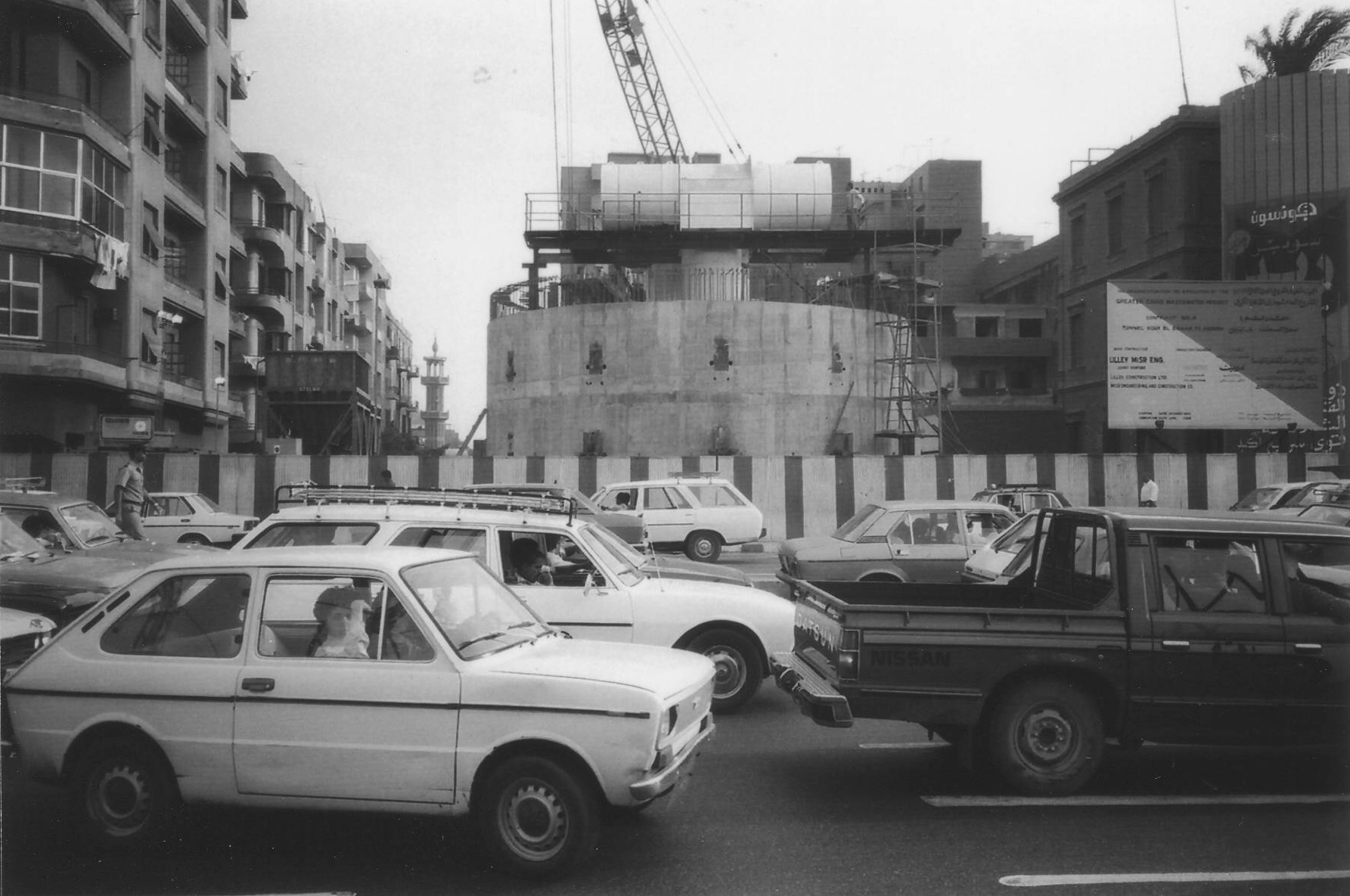
Nasr 133

From 1977 to 1980 the Fiat Argentine subsidiary built them, also under the Fiat name, and from 1981 to 1982 by Sevel Argentina. Around 15,821 Fiat 133 were made in the Fiat/Sevel Plant at Córdoba, Argentina, between 1977 and 1982.

A sporty version called FIAT 133 T IAVA developed by Industria Argentina de Vehículos de Avanzada (IAVA) was made between 1979 and 1980.

In April 1977, it was announced that Egypt was about to become the world's 32nd car-producing country. This followed the signing of an agreement for the shipment of CKD kits from Seat's Barcelona plant to the Helwan premises of the Nasr Automotive Manufacturing Company for assembly, in order to supply the Egyptian market and for export to Iraq.

== Motorsport ==
The 133 is popular in the Finnish low-budget motorsport called jokamiesluokka, a local folk racing series, where over 30 percent of the drivers chose to drive Fiat 133s at one point.

== Technical data ==
Technical data SEAT 133 (1979; all data works figures unless otherwise specified)
SEAT	133	133 Especial	Fiat 133B (Argentina)
Engine:	4-cylinder-inline engine, four-stroke, rear-mounted		
Displacement:	843 cc		903 cc
Bore × Stroke:	65 × 63.5 mm		65 × 68 mm
Max. Power at rpm:	34 PS (25 kW) at 4800	44 PS (32 kW) at 6400	40 PS (29 kW) at 5600
Max. Torque at rpm:	54 N⋅m (40 lb⋅ft) at 3200	55 N⋅m (41 lb⋅ft) at 3700	59 N⋅m (44 lb⋅ft) at 3600
Compression Ratio:	8.1:1	9.0:1	8.95:1
Fuel system:	1 Weber or Solex downdraft carb. (1bbl)	1 downdraft carb. (2bbl)	1 Weber 30 downdraft carb. (1bbl)
Valvetrain:	OHV, camshaft in block, chain		
Cooling:	Water-cooled		
Gearbox:	4-speed manual		
Front suspension:	Upper wishbones, lower transverse leaf spring, stabilizing bar		
Rear suspension::	Double wishbones, coil springs, stabilizing bar		
Brakes:	Front and rear drum brakes	Front disc brakes (Ø 227 mm), rear drum brakes	
Steering:	Rack-and-pinion steering		
Body:	Steel unibody construction		
Track front/rear:	1,150 / 1,215 mm (45.3 / 47.8 in)		
Wheelbase:	2,025 mm (79.7 in)		
Length: Width: Height:	3,450 mm (136 in); 1,420 mm (56 in); 1,330 mm (52 in)		3,490 mm (137 in); 1,420 mm (56 in); 1,330 mm (52 in)
Weight:	690 kg (1,521 lb)	700 kg (1,543 lb)	710 kg (1,565 lb)
Top speed:	120 km/h (75 mph)	135 km/h (84 mph)	125 km/h (78 mph)
0–100 km/h (0–62 mph):	n.a.		
Fuel consumption (DIN):	7.0 litres per 100 kilometres (40 mpg_{‑imp}; 34 mpg_{‑US})		

== In popular media ==
The car is featured in a game called My Summer Car. it is driven by the players cousin Pena Kesseli whom you can use to get a ride home, though the game calls it the Fittan 133 instead. A non-driveable variant also exists in the game.
