= Zastava 750 =

Supermini vehicle

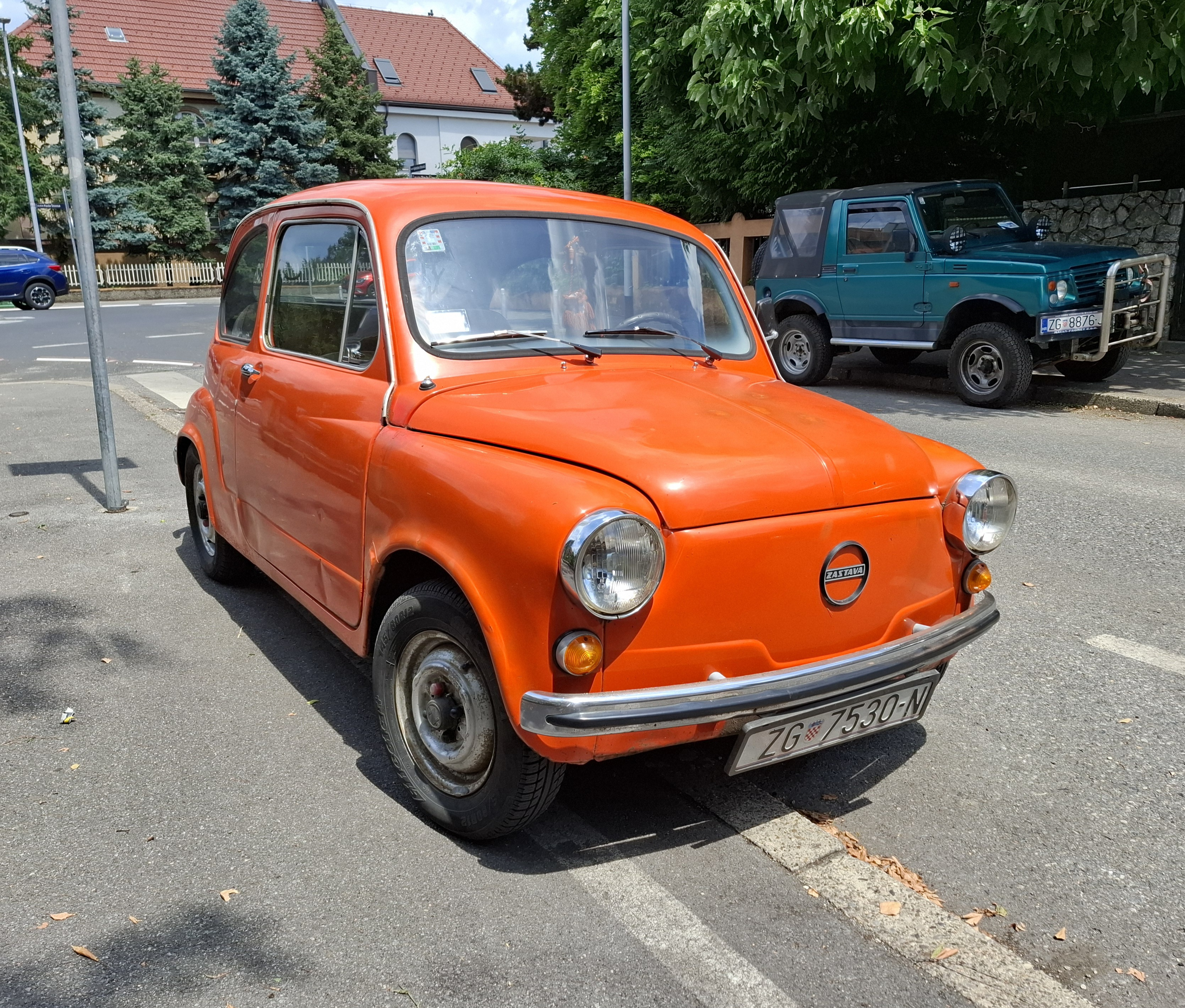
- Zastava 750 in Zagreb, 2025

Overview
- Manufacturer: Zastava
- Also called: Zastava 600; Zastava 850; Fiat 750Z (Colombia); Yugo 850 (Turkey)
- Production: 1955–1962 (Zastava 600); 1962–1985 (Zastava 750); 1980–1985 (Zastava 850)
- Assembly: Yugoslavia: Kragujevac; Colombia: Bogotá (CCA)

Body and chassis
- Class: City car (A)
- Body style: 2-door saloon
- Layout: Rear engine, rear-wheel drive
- Related: Fiat 600

Powertrain
- Engine: 767 cc OHV I4; 843 cc OHV I4
- Transmission: 4-speed manual

Dimensions
- Wheelbase: 2,010 mm (79.1 in)
- Length: 3,300 mm (129.9 in)
- Width: 1,390 mm (54.7 in)
- Height: 1,410 mm (55.5 in)
- Curb weight: 640 kg (1,411 lb)

The Zastava 750 (Serbo-Croatian Cyrillic: Застава 750) is a supermini made by the Yugoslav car maker Zavod Crvena Zastava in Kragujevac. It was a version of the Fiat 600 made under licence from 1962 and was slightly longer than the original Fiat model. The Zastava 750 has a 767 cc (46.8 cu in) engine, also available in a more powerful 750 SE variant and later upgraded to 843 cc (51.4 cu in). It is the smallest car ever made by Zastava. Later on during production, in 1980, the Zastava 850 was introduced. It is nearly identical to the Zastava 750 but the engine had a larger capacity. The Zastava 850 is harder to find than the 750 model, but both are still widely available in former Yugoslavia.

The Zastava 750 is widely known by its nickname "Fića" (Фићa) in Serbian, "Fićo" in Bosnian and Croatian, by "Fičo" or "Fičko" in Slovene, and by "Fikjo" (Фиќо) in Macedonian. The nickname comes from the main character of a comic published by the newspaper Borba during the first years of the car's production.

== Development ==
The Yugoslavian-built Zastava 600 was a version of the Fiat 600 built under license. Production of Fiat-badged cars commenced in 1955, and the model was upgraded with a larger engine in September 1960. It received the Zastava 750 badge in 1962. The 750 retained frontal suicide doors (rear-hinged) until 1969. Later it got bigger front lights, auto-adjusting brakes, seat belts, slightly improved interior and many other small improvements. The later Zastava 850 had many improvements from the original model, but it retained the same 600 body style. The 750 used a 25 PS (18 kW) 767 cc engine, with 30 PS (22 kW) at 5400 rpm and torque of 38 lb⋅ft (52 N⋅m) at 3600 rpm in the 750 SE. The later 850 received an 843 cc version providing 32 PS (24 kW) and a useful dollop of extra torque.

Production of the Zastava 750 ended on 18 November 1985. The car's popularity increased in the last few years, partly from the low fuel consumption and very cheap price as a second-hand vehicle. Also, it is becoming a symbol of nostalgia, and many youngsters who need a cheap utilitarian vehicle with a bohemian status symbol buy this car as a second-hand vehicle. Because of that rise in popularity, prices have risen in the last couple of years and many fan clubs have emerged.

== Colombian assembly ==
The Zastava 750 was also assembled in Colombia—next to a variety of American Jeeps as well as other Fiat models—by Leonidas Lara (C.C.A.) in Bogotá. It was sold in Colombia as the "Fiat 750Z", from 1977 until 1984. The 750Z was built in comparatively large numbers for the first three years, after which production slowed down considerably. This was due to CCA becoming Mazda's local subsidiary, favoring production of the more profitable Japanese cars.

== Gallery ==
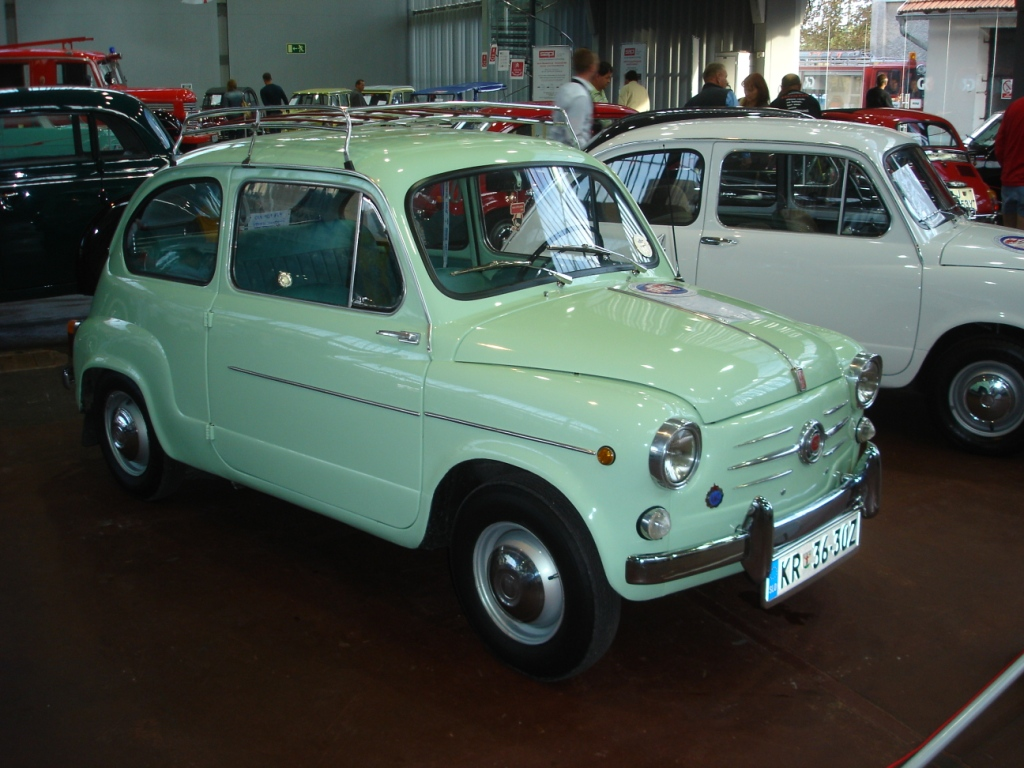
Zastava 750 (pre-1969 version with suicide doors)

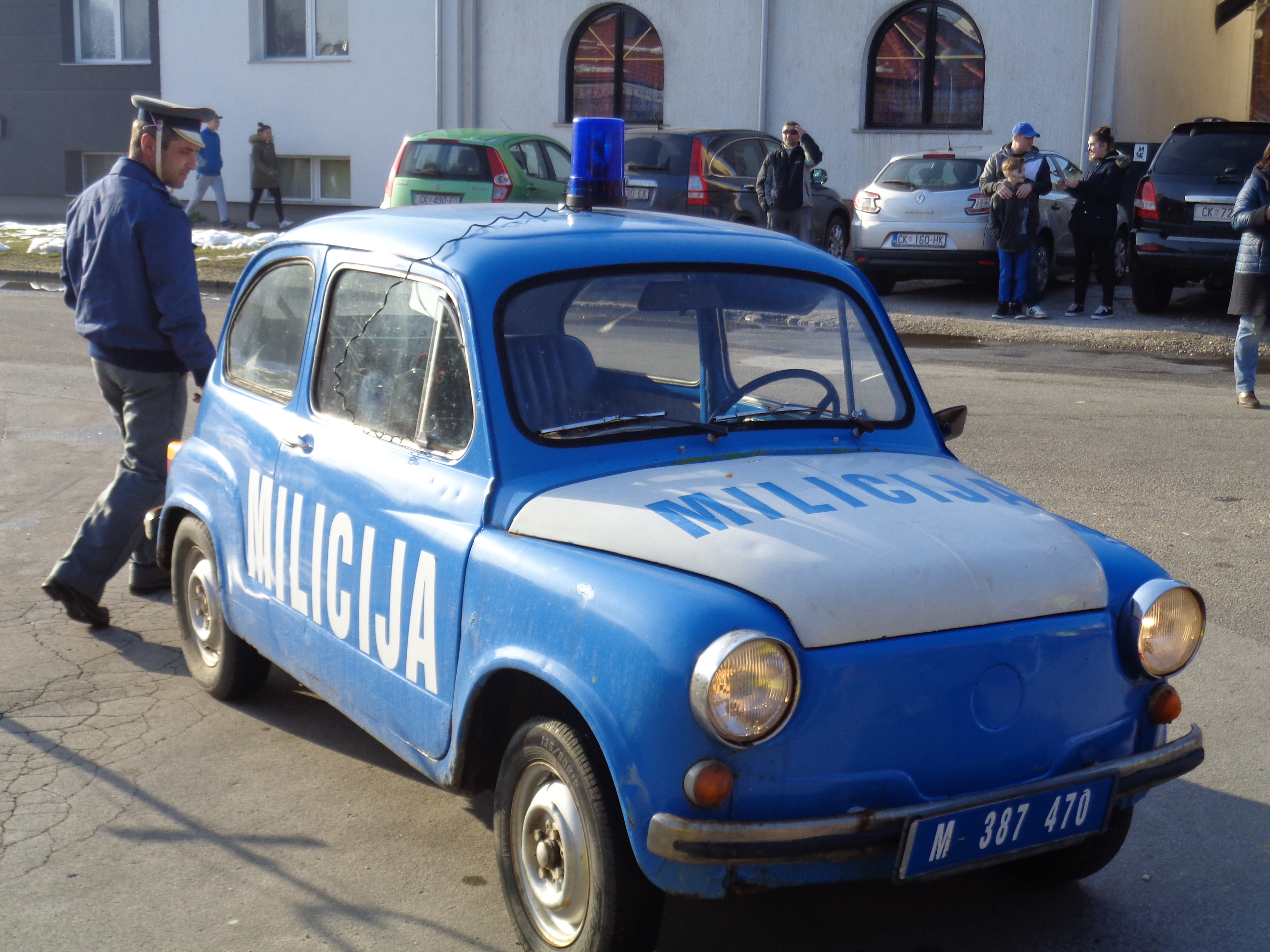
Zastava 750 Yugoslav police car. The 750 was a common choice of milicija car in communist Yugoslavia.

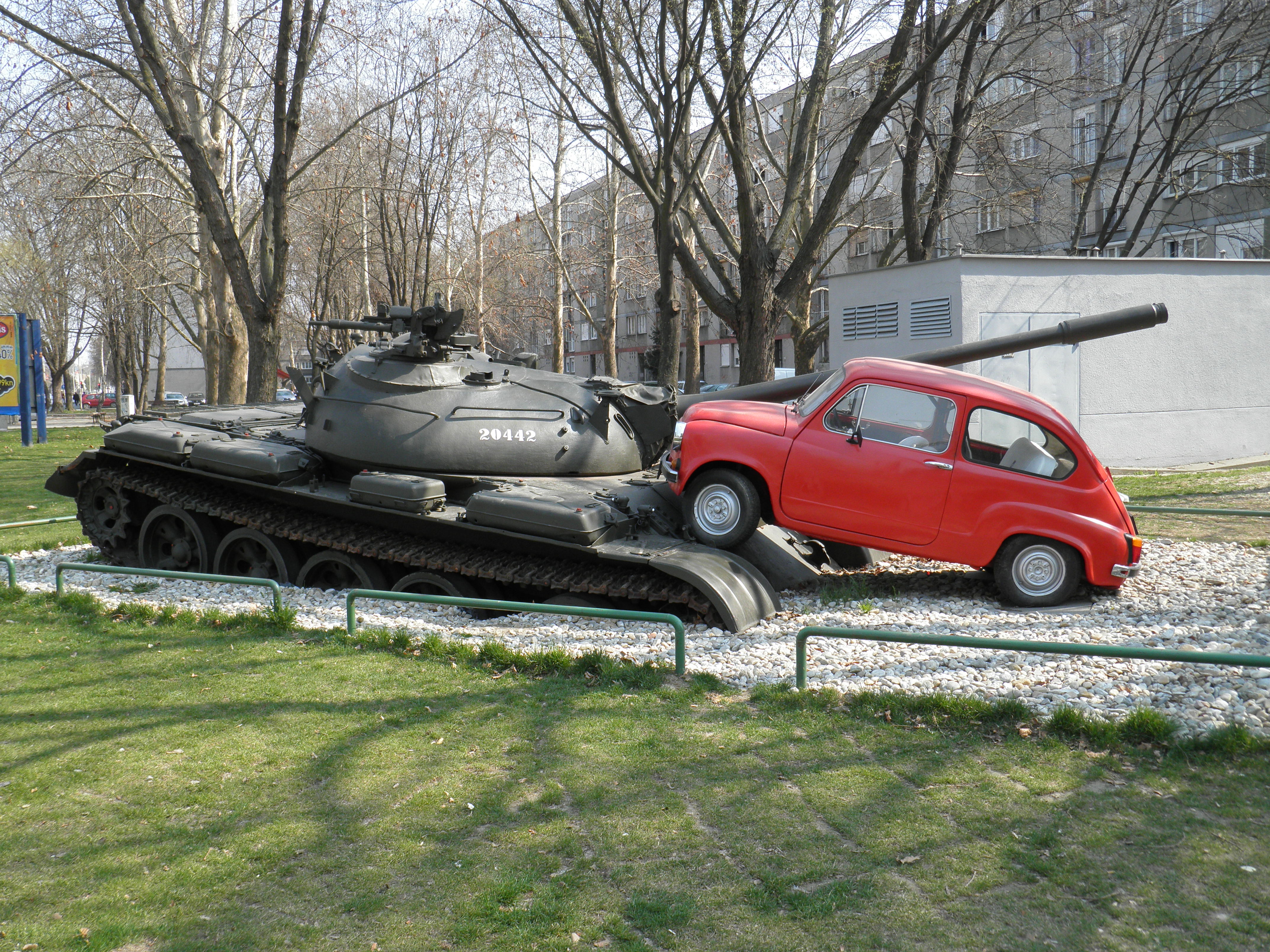
Red Fićo monument, Croatia
