= Fiat Citivan =

Fiat Citivan may refer to:

- A version of the Fiat 900T
- A version of the Fiat Duna
