= Pirin-Fiat =

Pirin-Fiat was a trademark used on several passenger automobiles produced in Lovech, Bulgaria. These were the result of a collaboration between Fiat (an Italian automobile firm) and SPC Balkankar (a Bulgarian state production cooperative). Production lasted for just over four years (1967–1971).

== Beginnings ==
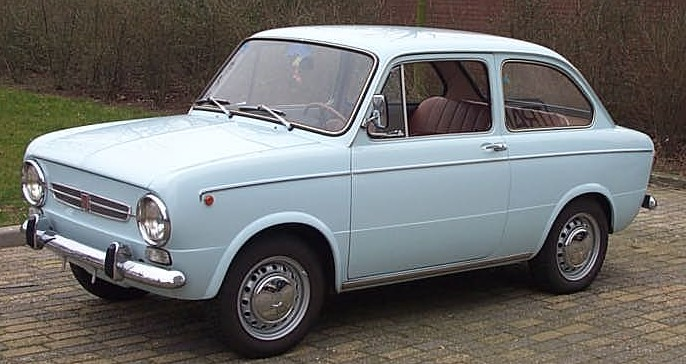
Fiat 850 sedan

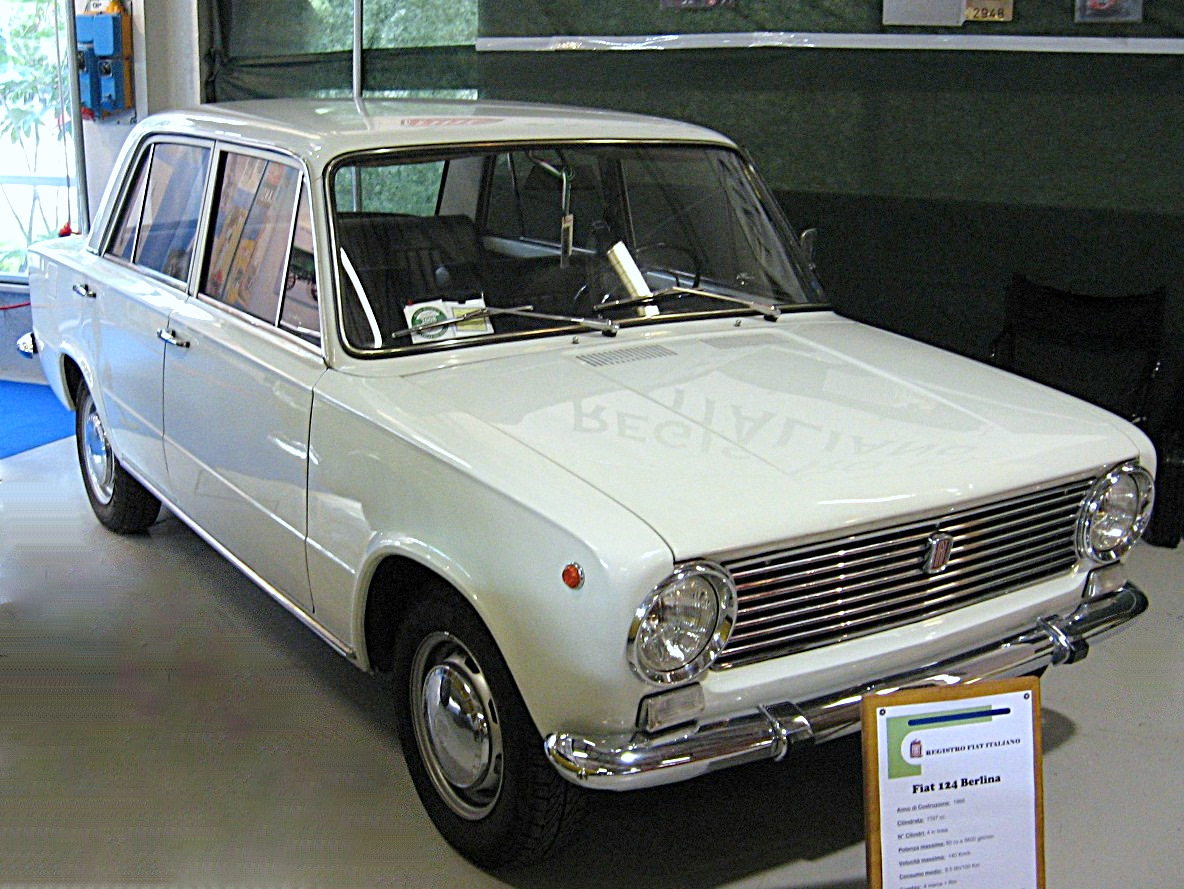
Fiat 124 sedan

On September 26, 1966, a meeting was held between the management of SPC (state production cooperative) Balkankar and representatives of the Italian automobile company Fiat. Subsequently, the Fiat representatives informed their management in Turin that SPC Balkankar wished to enter into a contract with Fiat, with performance to be given in several stages as follows:

- Until the end of 1966, Fiat was to deliver 300-350 Fiat 850 passenger cars in complete knockdown (CKD) kits to be assembled by SPC Balkankar.
- Until the end of 1967, Fiat was to deliver 3000-5000 Fiat 850 passenger cars in complete knockdown kits to be assembled by SPC Balkankar.
- Fiat was to design a factory for the assembly and partial manufacture of automobiles, which was to begin operations in Bulgaria at a later date.
- Fiat was to set up a network of service stations.
- Fiat was to design and construct a warehouse for spare parts.

The proposed contract specified that SPC Balkankar was to pay Fiat through barter of Bulgarian goods exported by Bulgarian ETO's (export trade organizations). On November 17 and 18, 1966, the sales manager of SPC Balkancar and the Fiat representatives negotiated a finalized version of the contract, which resolved the earlier impasse caused by the steep demands of the Bulgarian side. On December 6, 1966, the Bulgarians received the first blueprints from Fiat in two variants – 1A and 2A.

The actual contract was signed in Turin, Italy, between SPC Balkankar and Fiat, providing that Balkankar would be allowed to assemble the passenger cars Fiat 850 sedan, Fiat 850 coupé, Fiat 124 sedan and Fiat 124 station wagon.

== Production ==
The first 18 Fiat 850 cars arrived at the Factory for Passenger Cars Balkan in Lovech on May 10, 1967. After the Bulgarian side was trained in the assembly of the Fiats, it was decided to choose a Bulgarian-sounding trademark for the cars. The unofficial trademark was Pirin, but it was never featured on the cars themselves. The first Fiat 850 passenger car was assembled at the Balkan factory on June 27, 1967.

On March 12, 1968, the first Fiat 850 cars based on variant 2A were received at the factory as complete knockdown kits. This was followed by the arrival of Fiat's permanent technical adviser on April 2. The assembly of Fiat 850 based on variant 2A began on April 4, 1968.

Between April and May 1968, Bulgarian engineer Dimitar Damyanov was sent to Turin to sign a contract with Fiat regarding the delivery of welding and assembly machinery.

On April 28, 1968, the Italian engineer Brasio arrived at the Balkan factory in Lovech as a technical adviser, and on December 13 of the same year the Italian specialists Mueller and Grimaldi arrived to install the painting machinery.

The five-year contract between Balkankar and Fiat lapsed in 1971 and was not renewed. The last Fiat 850 left the Lovech factory in September 1971.

== Production numbers ==
- Fiat 850 sedan (1967–1971): 360
- Fiat 850 coupe (1967–1970): 89
- Fiat 124 sedan (1967–1971): 274
- Fiat 124 station wagon (1967–1970): 35

Total production: 758

== See also ==
- Bulgarrenault
- Polski Fiat
