= Coriasco =

Italian coachbuilding company

- Trade name: Carrozzeria Coriasco S.p.A.
- Industry: Automotive coachwork
- Founded: 1921
- Founder: Giovanni Coriasco
- Defunct: 2000
- Headquarters: Turin, Italy
- Key people: Giuseppe Coriasco, Cesare Bruno

Carrozzeria Coriasco S.p.A. is a former Italian company which developed and produced automobile coachwork, with a focus on commercial derivatives of popular Fiat vehicles.

== History ==
After a failed attempt in 1920 with his brothers, Giovanni Coriasco restarted the company in 1921 together with his son Giuseppe, to produce transformations of standard cars. It would become one of the famous Italian carrozzieri "fuori serie" (custom build coachworkers). They did not only start this venture for producing passenger cars, but even more for commercial vehicles.

In the 1920s the company became known for good value for money coachwork based on Ceirano, Fiat, Chiribiri, Diatto, and Itala chassis. In the 1930s its activities were more focused on transforming utilitarian vehicles for use by street traders, for example the Fiat 508 Balilla. Starting around 1940, the coachwork company realised models specifically for promotional vehicles. It was the Fiat 600 Multipla that established the brand's reputation with its van version, the Fiat 600 M Coriasco.

The models that followed mostly were adaptations of Fiat models, both passenger and commercial vehicles. Thanks to the success with the 600 Multipla and 850 T derivates, in Italy 'Coriasco' nowadays is a household name for light vans. Apart from those commercial vehicles, Coriasco also made many one-offs, even elaborate cars like the 1953 Fiat 1100 Boat-car and a few racing cars.

== The main transformations ==
From 1948 until the end of the 1980s, Carrozzeria Coriasco created numerous transformations based on a variety of models, almost exclusively Fiats. Often they are models specifically produced in small series and distributed directly via the Fiat dealer network, such as:

- Fiat 508 C Balilla (1938) - Commercial vehicle built on the passenger car chassis. This was one of the first transformations of the Carrozzeria Coriasco.
- Fiat 1400 Giardinetta Metallica (1951) - Commercial vehicle built on the basis of the Fiat 1400 sedan.
- Fiat 1100 Giardinetta (1954) - Commercial vehicle based on the Fiat 1100 berlina.
- Fiat 1100 Boat-car (1953) - Experimental car built on the basis of the famous Fiat 1100-103 with a boat 'coachwork'! Some sources suggest it was a study for an amphibious vehicle, others say it was a promotional car for the Scuola Guida & Nautica Scarani in Bologna.
- Fiat 600 M Coriasco (1956) - Van versions, pick-up, ambulance and minibus, built on the basis of the Fiat 600 Multipla with a specific body except for the 600 Multipla front. This model has been the most successful project of the brand with more than 18,000 units built.
- Fiat 600 T (1966) - Variants derived of the model produced in large volumes by Fiat Veicoli Commerciali.
- Fiat 127 Familiare (1972) - Station wagon version of the 127 that was never realised by Fiat. This model was also offered as a panel van named "Furgoncino". The taillights come from the Renault 6.
- Fiat 242 (1975) - Minivan and camper versions realised by Coriasco.
- Fiat 900T (1976) - Variants derived of the Fiat original, with specific adaptations, in particular the "camioncino" version.
- Fiat Coriasco 127 Farm (1978) - Vehicle using the Fiat 127 2nd series of 1977 as a basis, with the rear part raised following the concept of the Matra-Simca Rancho, a recreational vehicle.

In the 1980s, Coriasco developed a number of specially equipped versions of Fiat and Lancia models with the label 'Style'. Carrozzeria Coriasco closed down in 2000.

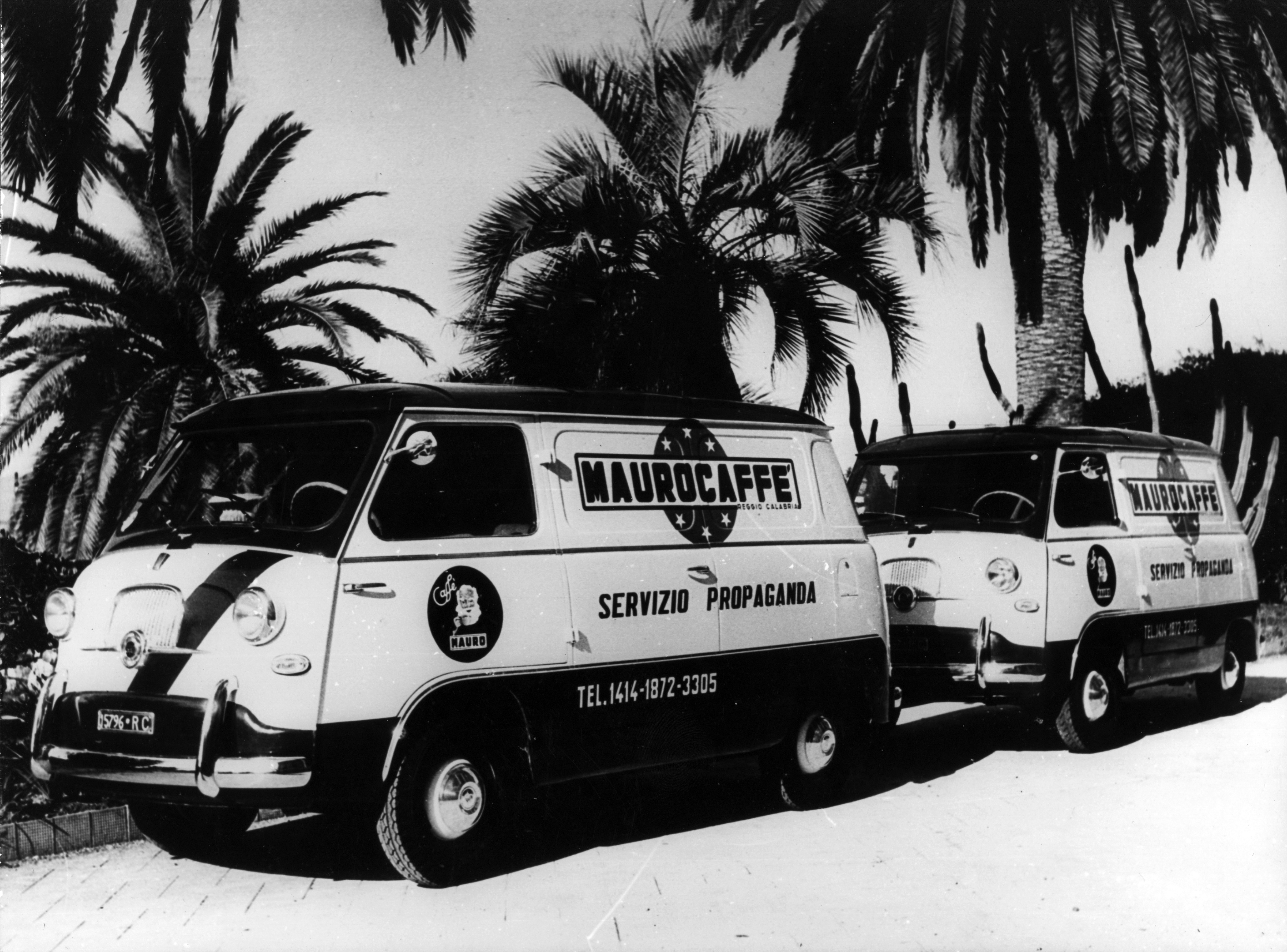
Fiat Furgoni

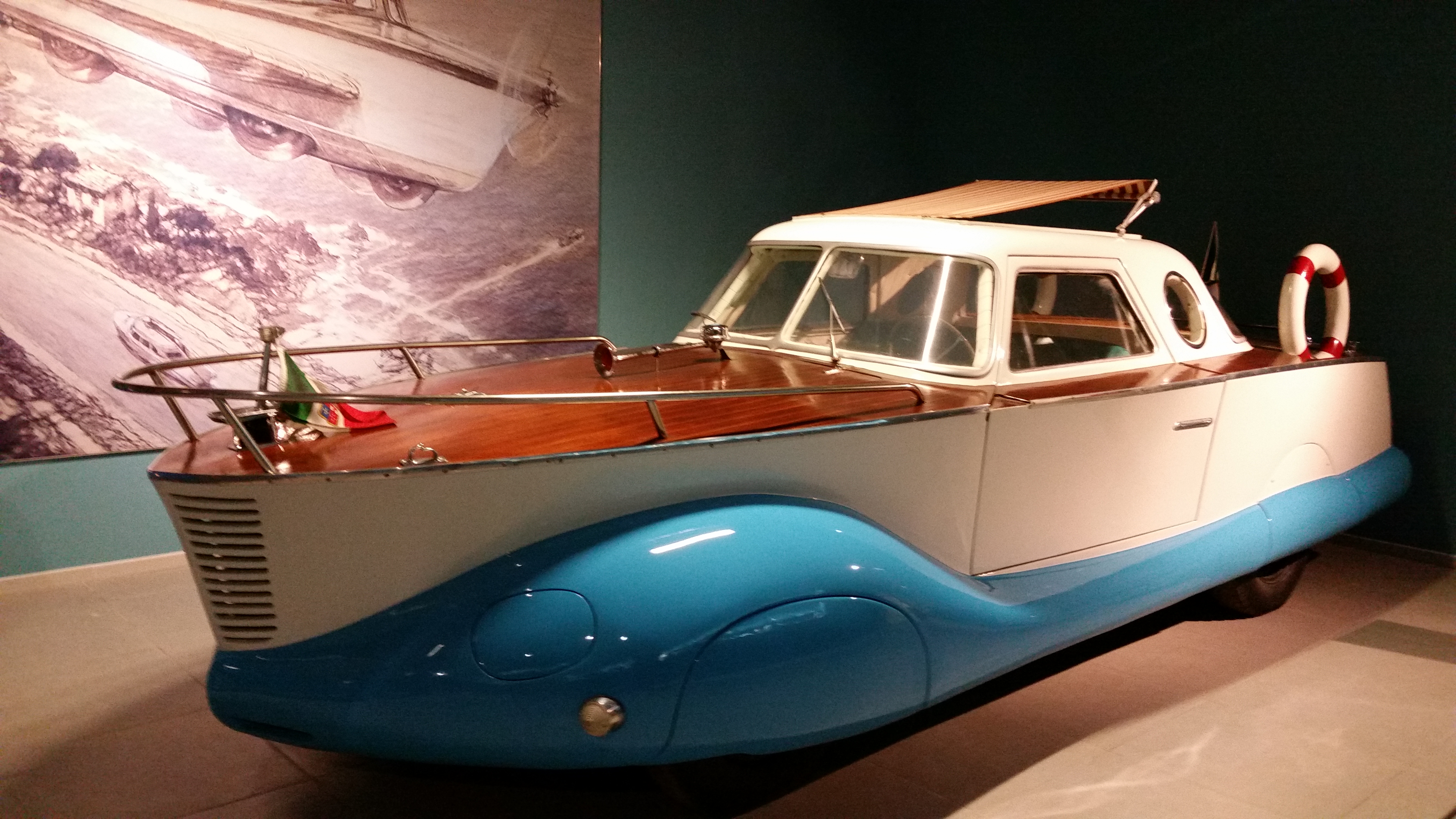
Fiat 1100 Boat-car

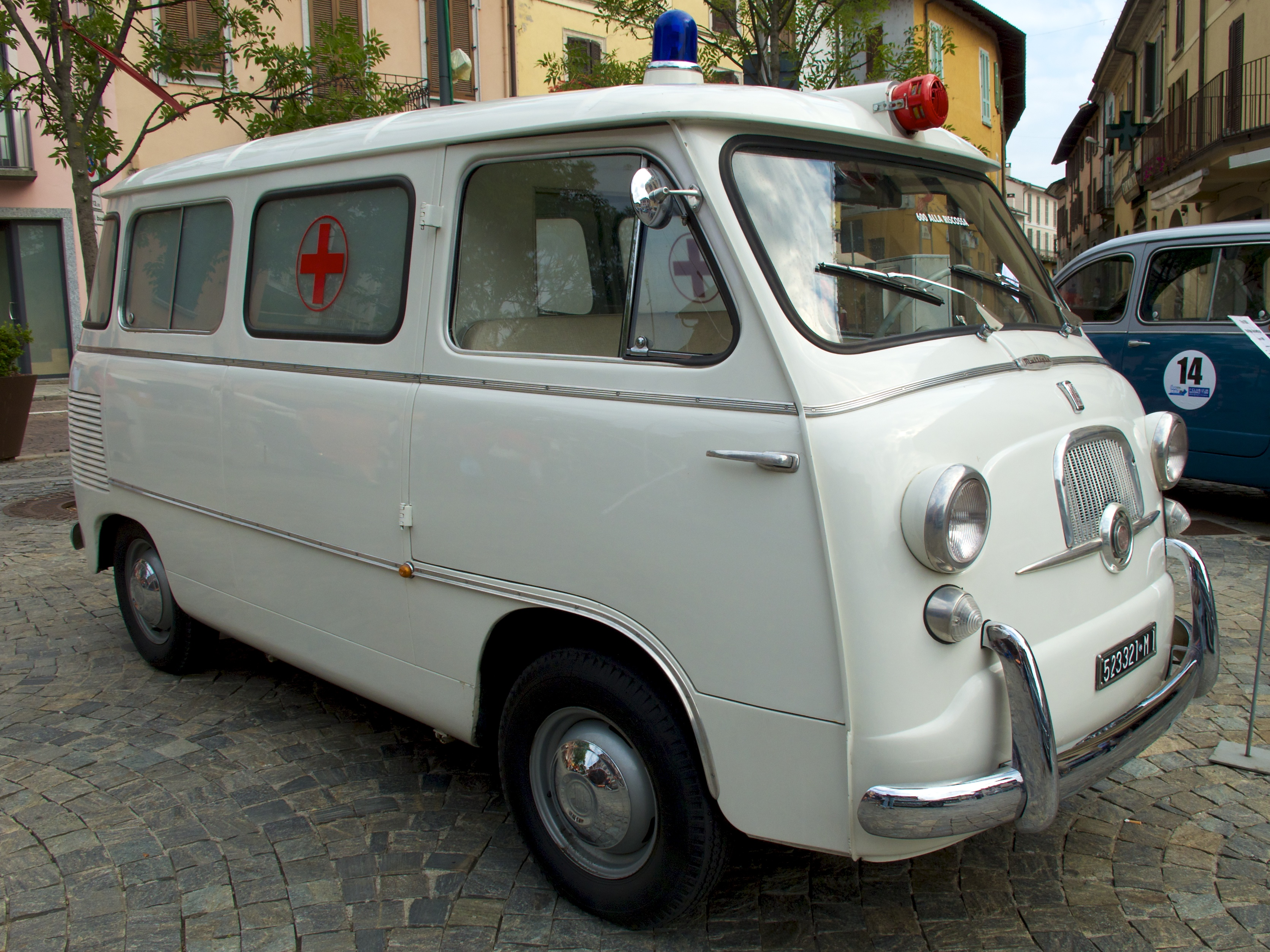
Fiat 600 M Coriasco Ambulance

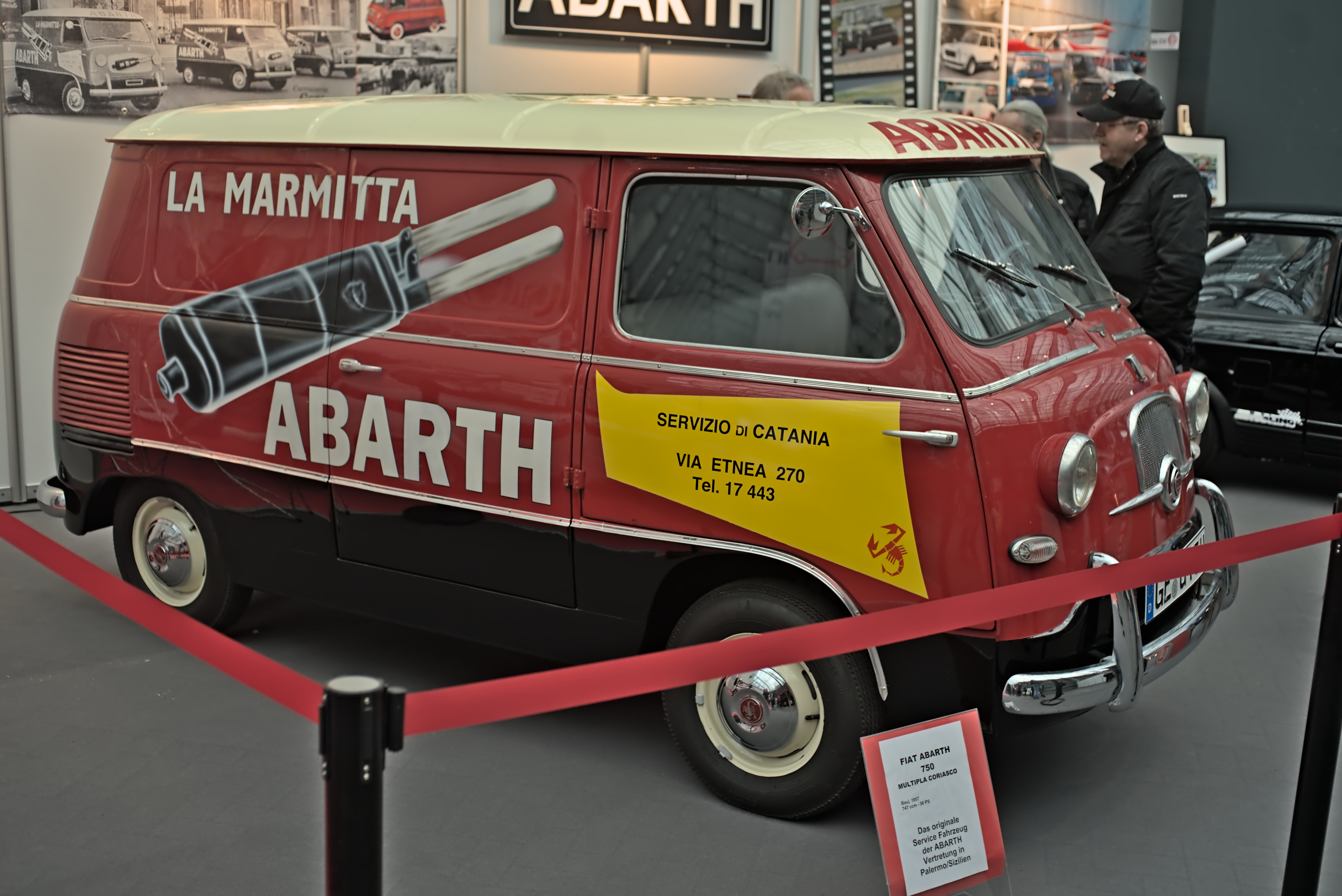
Fiat Abarth 750 Multipla Coriasco

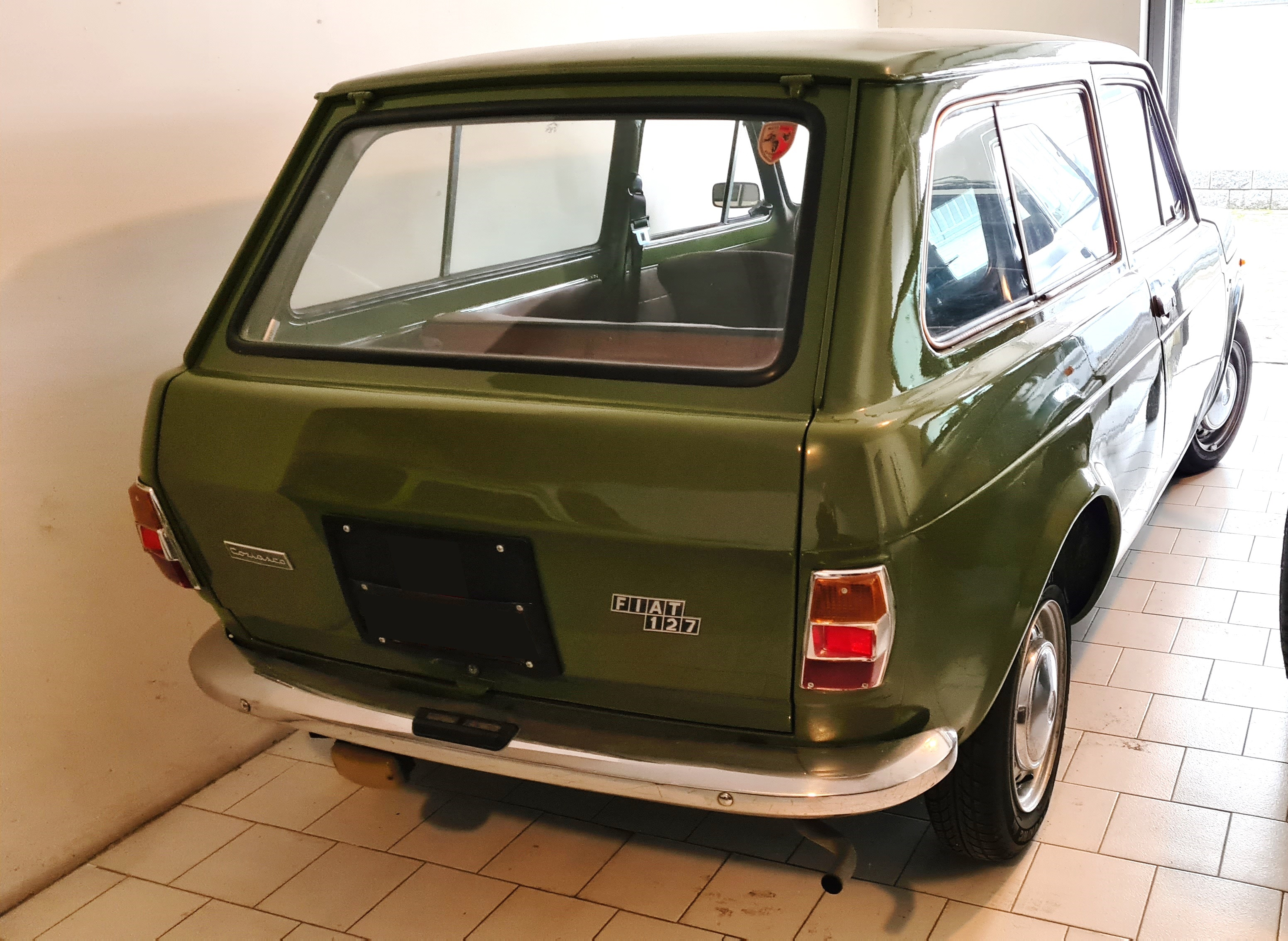
Fiat 127 Familiare Coriasco

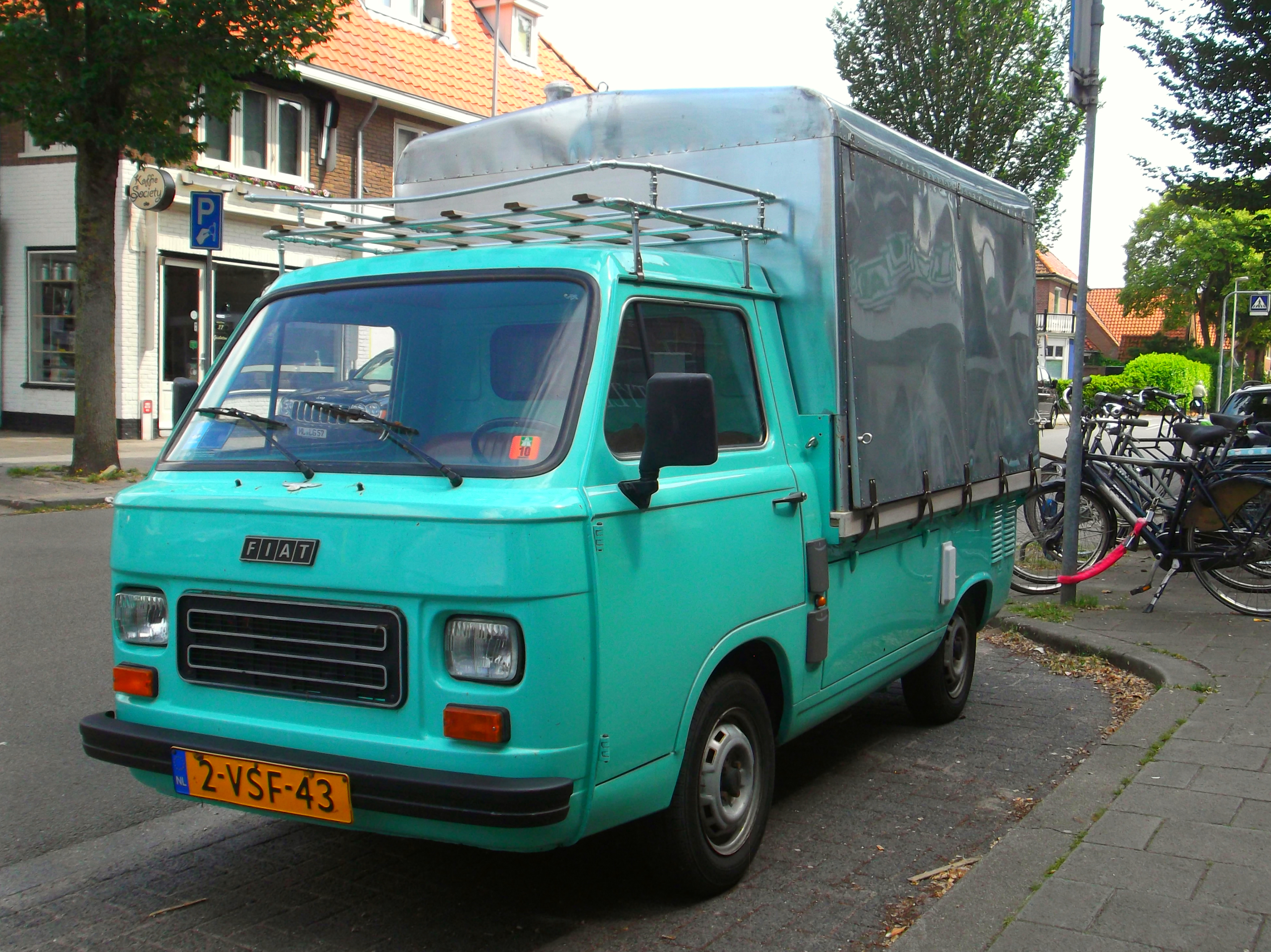
Fiat 900T Coriasco
