= Fiat 850 =

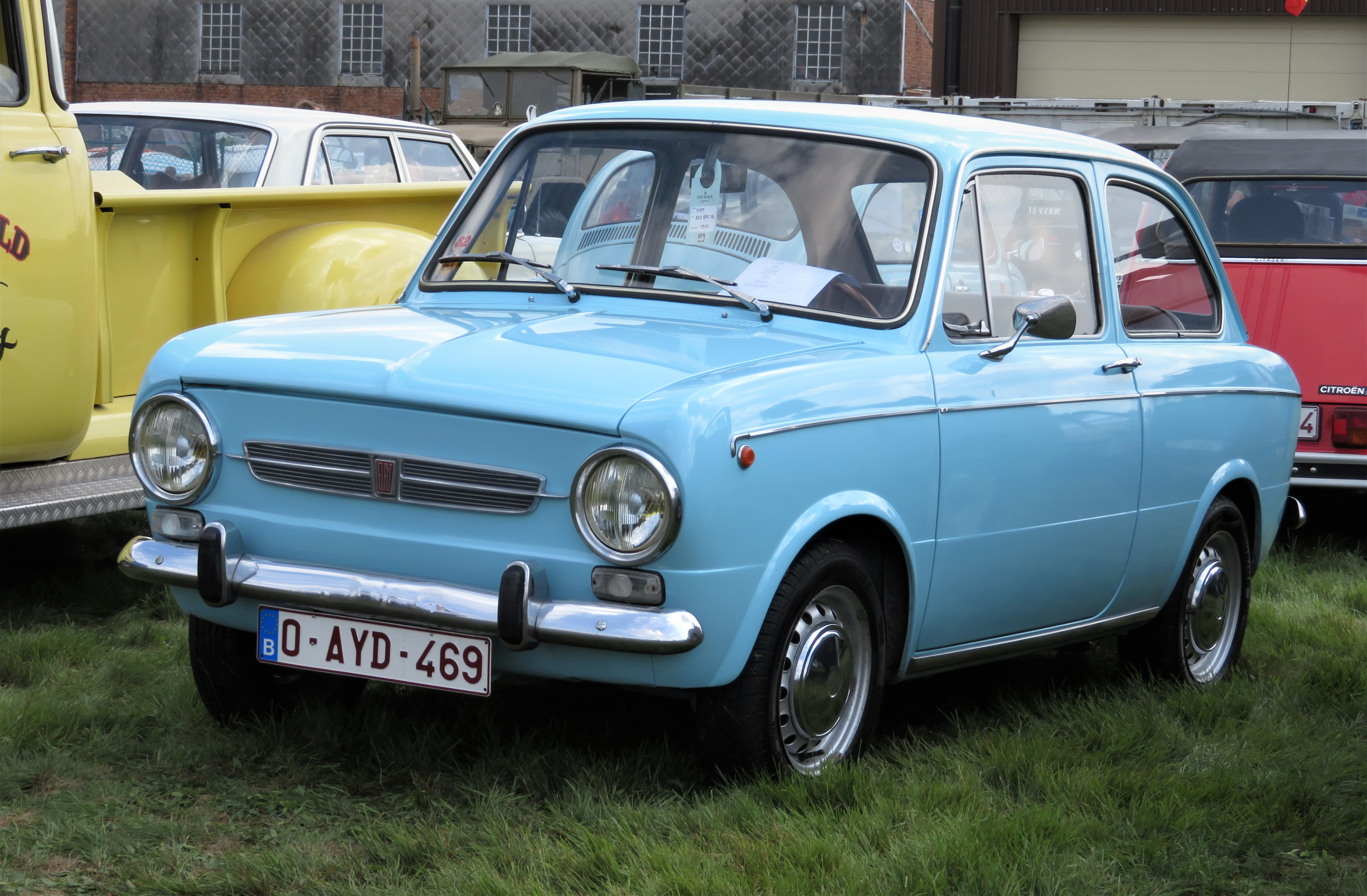

Overview
- Manufacturer: Fiat
- Also called: Neckar Adria; SEAT 850
- Production: 1964–1971 (until 1973 for Spider)
- Assembly: Italy: Turin (Mirafiori Plant); Spain: Barcelona (Zona Franca); West Germany: Heilbronn (Neckar Automobilwerke); Bulgaria: Lovech (Pirin-Fiat); Malaysia: Johor Bahru
- Designer: Dante Giacosa (saloon); Felice Mario Boano and Gian Paolo Boano at Centro Stile Fiat (Coupé); Giorgetto Giugiaro at Bertone (Spider)

Body and chassis
- Class: Supermini (B)
- Body style: 2-door saloon; 2-door coupé; 2-door roadster (Spider); 4-door minivan (Familiare); 3-door van (850T)
- Layout: Rear-engine, rear-wheel-drive
- Related: Fiat Moretti Sportiva; SEAT/Fiat 133; Siata Spring

Powertrain
- Engine: 817 cc Tipo 100 OHV I4 (US only); 843 cc 100G/GB/GC OHV I4; 903 cc 100GBC/GBS OHV I4
- Transmission: 4-speed manual; 4-speed Idroconvert/Idromatic semi-automatic w/ torque converter

Dimensions
- Wheelbase: 2,027 mm (79.8 in)
- Length: Berlina: 3,575 mm (140.7 in); Coupé: 3,652 mm (143.8 in); Spider: 3,782 mm (148.9 in); Familiare: 3,735 mm (147.0 in)
- Width: Saloon: 1,425 mm (56.1 in); Spider: 1,498 mm (59.0 in); Coupé, Familiare: 1,500 mm (59.1 in)
- Height: Saloon: 1,385 mm (54.5 in); Coupé: 1,300 mm (51.2 in); Spider: 1,220 mm (48.0 in); Familiare: 1,655 mm (65.2 in)
- Kerb weight: Saloon: 670 kg (1,477 lb); Coupé: 720 kg (1,587 lb); Spider: 725 kg (1,598 lb); Familiare: 900 kg (1,984 lb)

Chronology
- Predecessor: Fiat 600
- Successor: Fiat 127; Fiat 133; Fiat X1/9 (Spider); Fiat 900T (Familiare & 850T)

The Fiat 850 (Tipo 100G) is a small rear-engine, rear-wheel-drive car manufactured and marketed by Italian car manufacturer Fiat from 1964 to 1973.

== History ==
=== Overview ===
Its technical design was an evolution of the successful Fiat 600, as the 850 was originally thought to be its successor. This, however, did not materialize, as the 600 remained in production during almost all of the 850's lifespan, which also was a larger and more expensive car. The internal name for the Fiat 600 development project was "Project 100" and consequently, the internal Fiat codename for the 850 project was 100G (G was a follow on of model designations for the 600 which ran from A to F). The engine of the 850 was based on that of the Fiat 600, but had its capacity increased to 843 cc. The 850 came in two versions: "normale" (standard) with 34 hp (25 kW) and engine code 100G.000 and "super" with 37 hp (27 kW) and engine code 100G.002. The maximum speed was approximately 125 km/h (78 mph). While it was not a large step forward in technical development, it possessed a certain charm with its large rolling eyes and its short tail, in which the engine sat.

=== Variants ===
The 850 family included several body styles sharing core technical components:

- Fiat 850 Special — Revised version of the 850 sedan, launched in 1968. It shared the 47 hp (35 kW) engine of the 850 Coupé, and offered front disc brakes, sport steering wheel and improved trim. With a 25 percent increase in power, plus disc brakes nestled behind 13" wheels, it was a "sports sedan" on a smaller scale. Engine code 100GB.000.
- Fiat 850 Familiare — The Familiare was a boxier and slightly larger successor to the Fiat 600 Multipla with a significantly squared-off rear featuring a rear hatch which made it a true van. It featured space for seven passengers in three rows, suitable for groups including children and thin adults, but is too small to accommodate seven typical adults in comfort.

The 850 Familiare continued in production till 1976 long after the saloon version of the 850 had been replaced by the Fiat 127. In 1976 the Fiat 900T was introduced, retaining most of the body panels of the 850 Familiare, but featuring the 903 cc engine from the Fiat 127 (although, in this application, still mounted behind the rear axle): the 900T benefited from significant enhancements in 1980, being now renamed 900E. At least in the UK the 900 series camper vans were badged as FIAT Amigo. Production stopped in 1985.

- Fiat 850 Coupé — The Coupé was introduced in 1965 at the Geneva Motor Show and had the original 843 cc (51 cu in) engine producing 47 hp (35 kW). The maximum speed at that time was 135 km/h (84 mph). Engine code 100GC.000.
- Fiat 850 Spider — At the same time as the Coupé, Fiat also introduced the convertible sporty two-seater Spider, with the original 843 cc engine tuned to produce 49 hp (36 kW) which allowed it to reach a top speed of 145 km/h (90 mph). The body was designed and built by Bertone in its Grugliasco, Turin plant. The folding fabric roof stowed under a rear metal body panel. The Bertone design featured smooth, simple lines and details, including recessed headlamps equipped with plexiglass covers angled to match the adjacent fenders/wings — and dihedral side panels similar to Bertone's 1963 Chevrolet Testudo. The Spider's engine code was 100GS.000.

At the time of their introduction into the United States the Sedan, Coupé and Spider were marketed with a reduced capacity, high compression 817 cc (50 cu in) engine in order to beat US emissions regulations at the time which applied only to engines equal to or larger than 50 cubic inches. Compression was raised from 8.8:1 to 9.2:1, requiring premium octane fuel.

In order to separate the sportier variants Coupé and Spider from the basic version, apart from the increase of engine performance, the equipment was also extended and adapted to the higher expectations. Both received sport seats, a sport steering wheel and round speedometer; the Spider even received a completely rearranged instrument panel. The front drum brakes were replaced with disc brakes, although drum brakes remained on the rear wheels.

In 1968, Fiat revised the successful Spider and Coupé again and gave them an even stronger engine with 903 cc and 52 hp (38 kW). They were called Sport Spider (engine code 100GBS.000) and Sport Coupé (engine code 100GBC.000). The Sport Spider body stayed essentially the same, but with a restyled front. The headlamps were moved forward slightly and the glass covers were eliminated giving the car a "frog-eye" look, and the original flush front turn indicators were replaced with units hung below the bumper. Several limited special edition versions of the Spider were offered, including the Racer featuring a body-colored metal hard top and the Racer Berlinetta featuring a black vinyl hard top.

There was a minivan and transporter model as a successor of the world's first minivan, Fiat 600 Multipla, which was later renamed to 900T and likewise received the larger capacity of 903 cc. The 850 Super was also license-built by NSU-Fiat in Heilbronn, Germany, who sold it as the "Neckar Adria." In 1968, NSU-Fiat changed to the more powerful 850 Special. Between June 1965 and September 1969, 6,619 Adrias were assembled in Germany. The establishment of the European Economic Community had gradually decreased Germany's protective tariffs, from 90 percent in 1957 to none at all from July 1968, and thus there was no longer any reason to assemble Fiats in Heilbronn.

Production of the Coupés and sedan ended in 1971, and of the Spiders in 1973, after altogether nearly 2.3 million models were sold worldwide, 140,000 of which were Spiders. Under the name SEAT 850, it was however further produced for some years in Spain, also in a four-door variant. As a successor the Fiat 127 was brought to the market in 1971 which combined the 903 cc push-rod OHV engine with the FIAT 128 transmission and suspension components in a fashionable fast- and later hatch-back 2-door sedan.

Between 1978 and 1983, the U.S. government issued a highly unusual recall for the Fiat 850—going back 10 years—for rust problems.

In 1967, Road & Track called the Fiat 850 coupé "one of the handsomest, best-balanced designs ever seen on a small car".

Consumer Reports disliked their 1968 Fiat 850, finding it noisy and sluggish, with poor ride and handling.

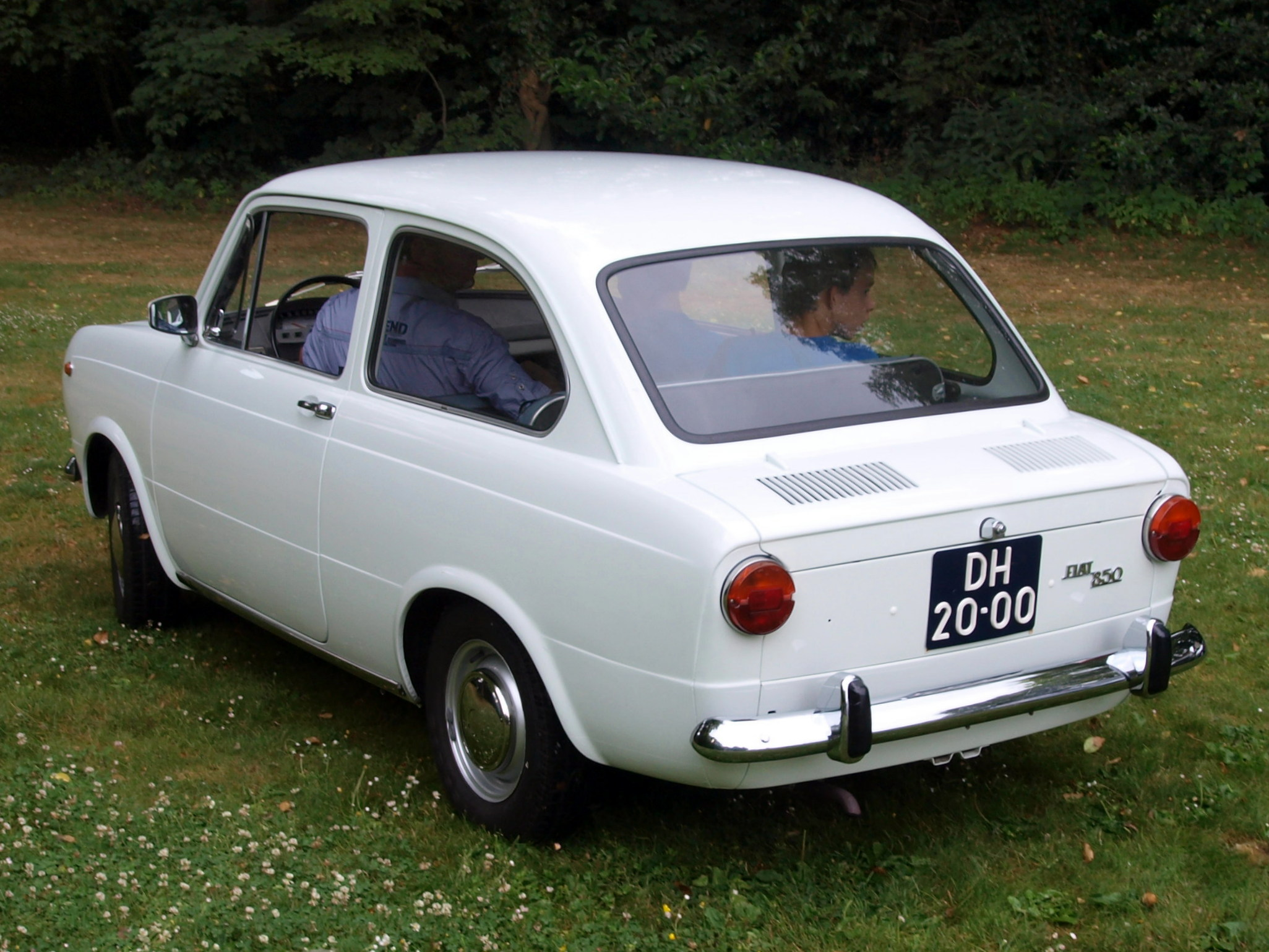
1965 Fiat 850 Sedan

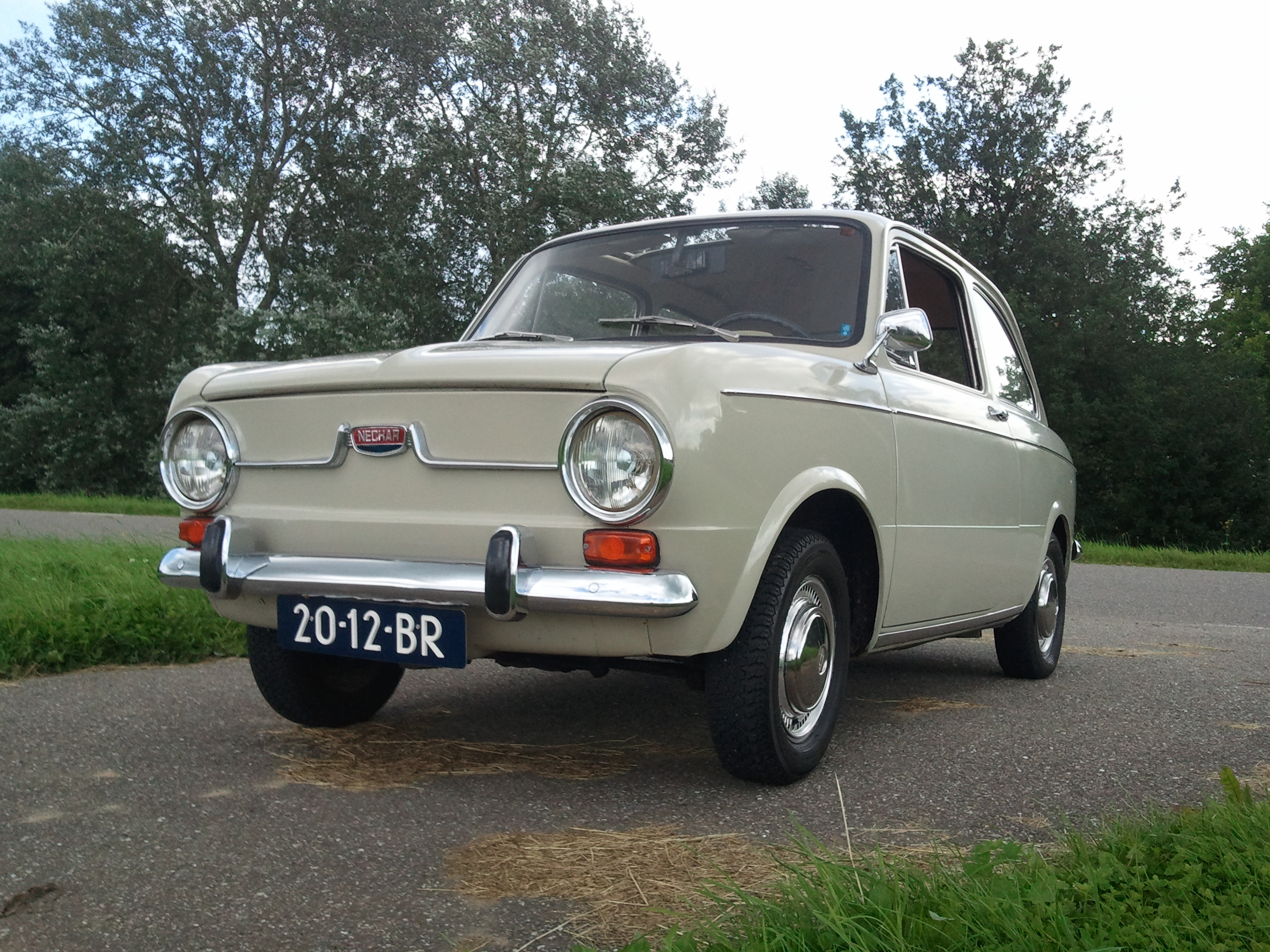
1966 Neckar Adria; this car mainly differed in terms of badging

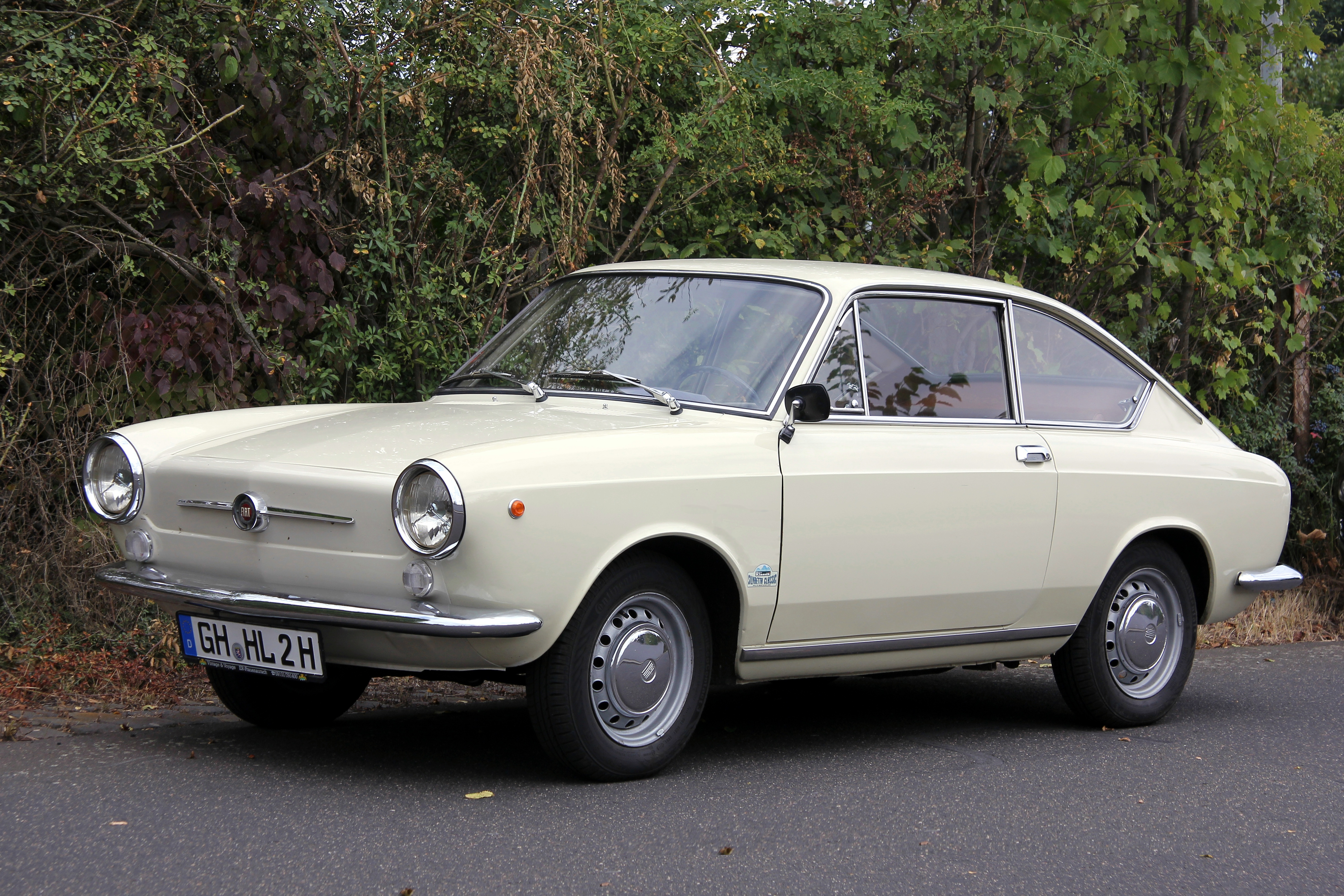
Fiat 850 Coupé, series I

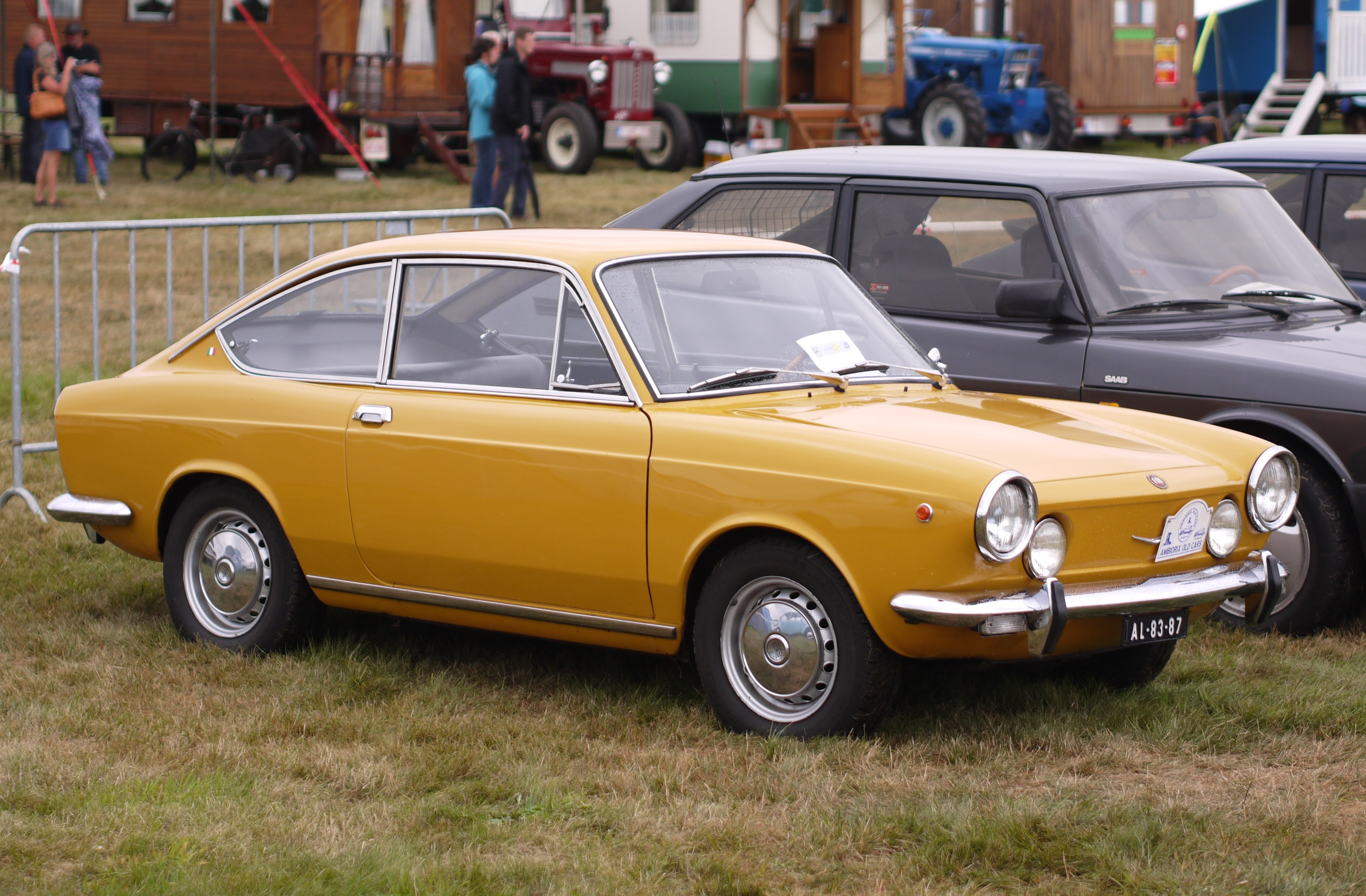
Fiat 850 Coupé, series II

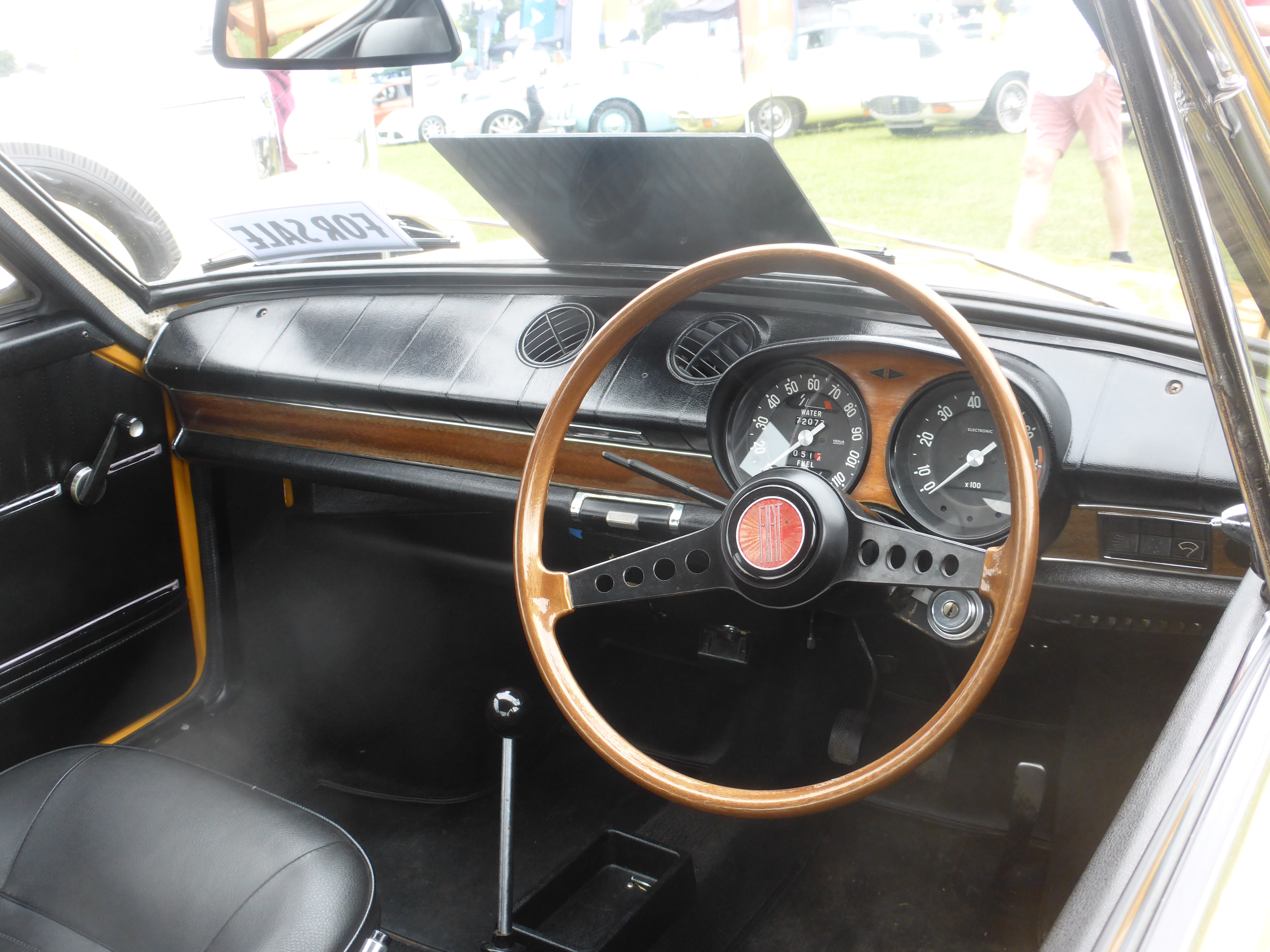
Fiat 850 Coupé interior

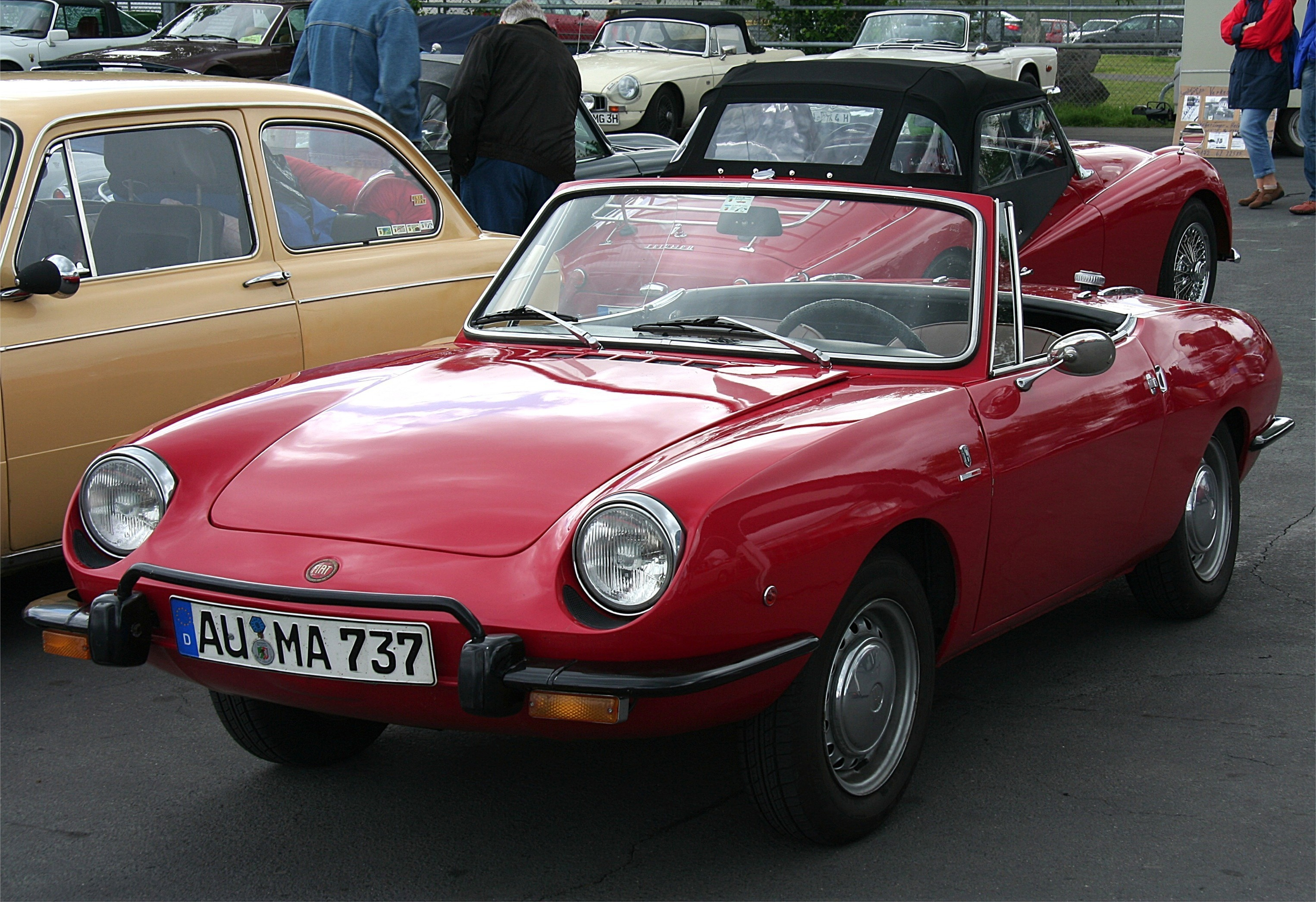
Fiat 850 Spider

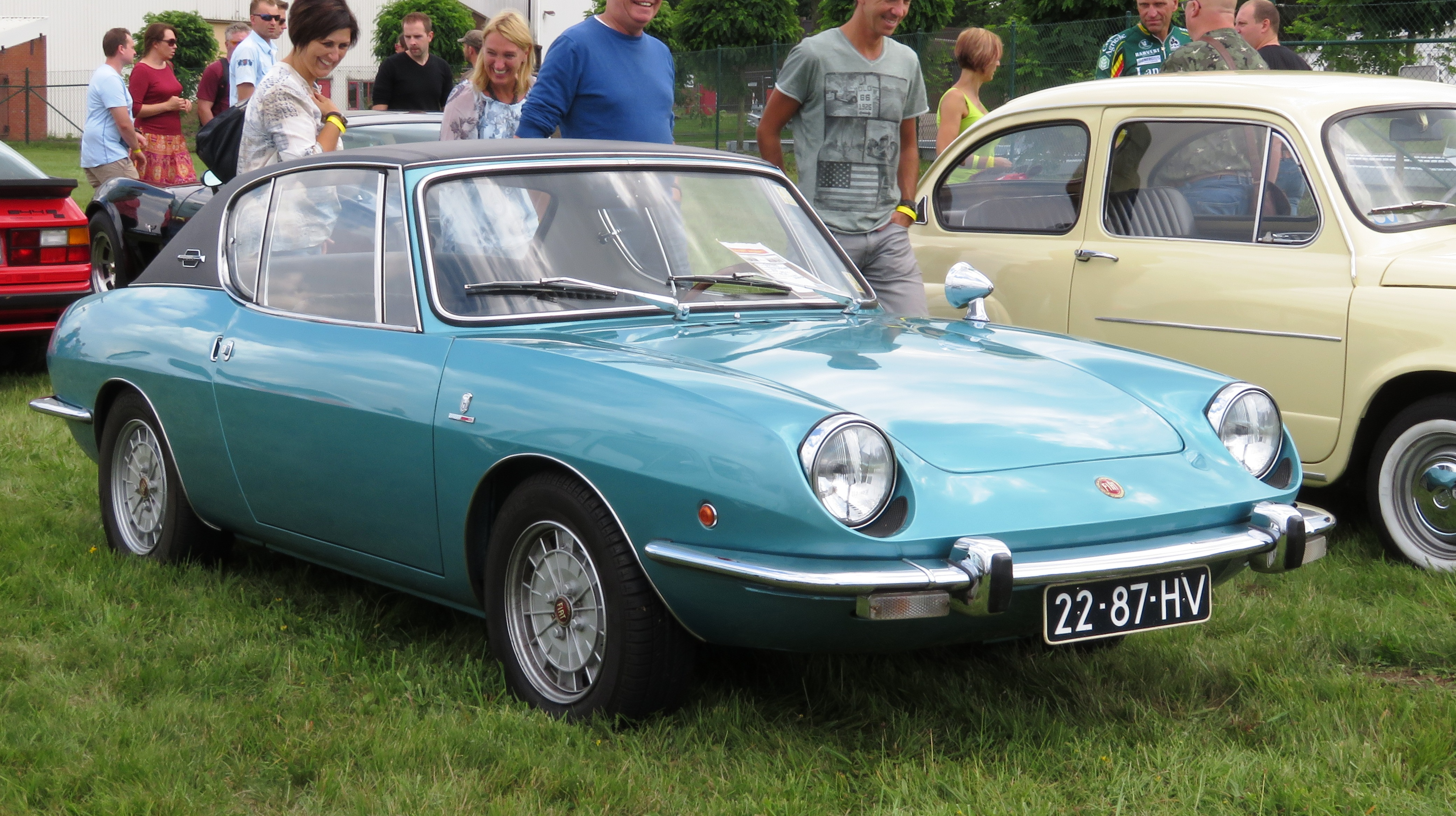
Fiat 850 Racer Berlinetta

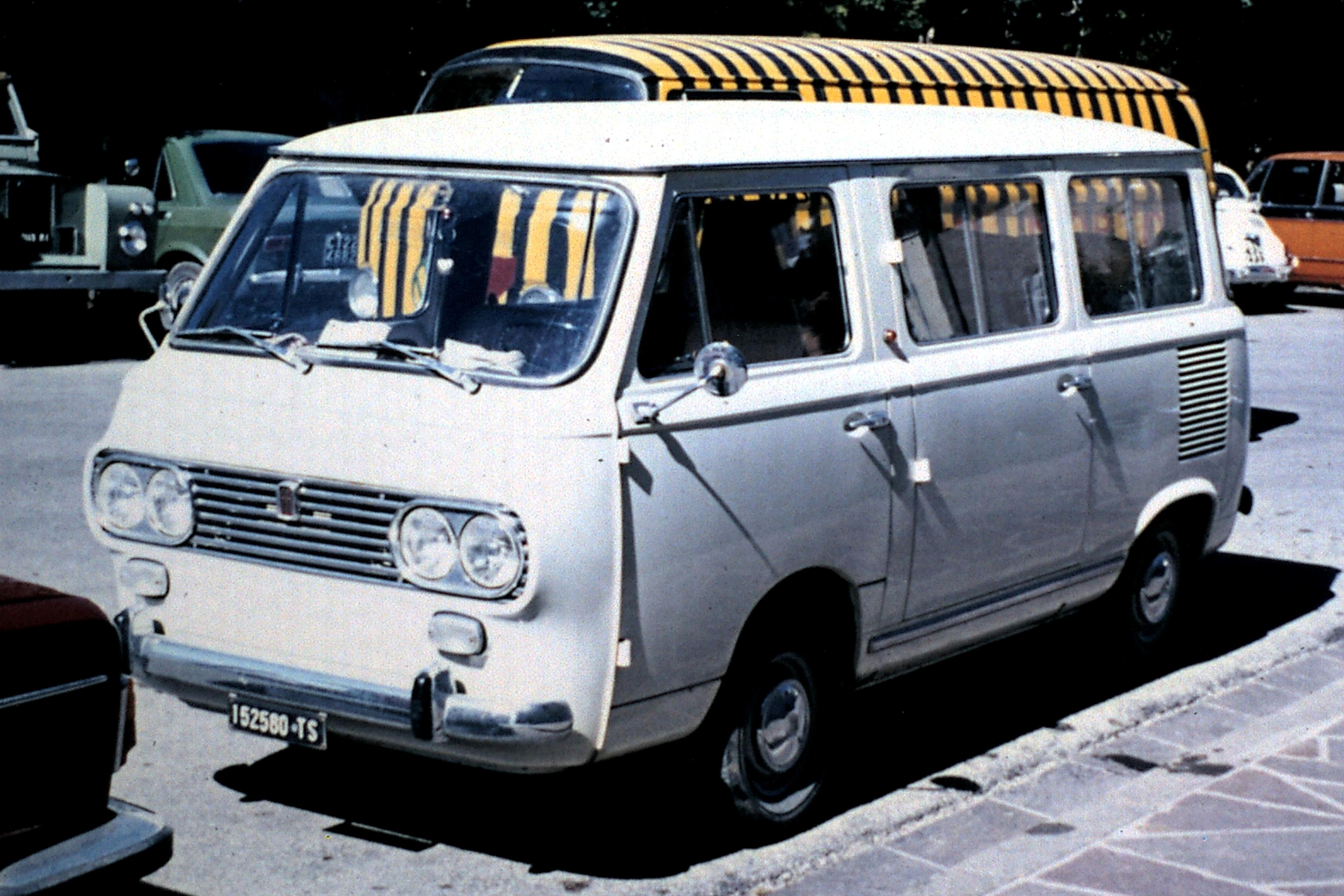
Fiat 850 Familiare

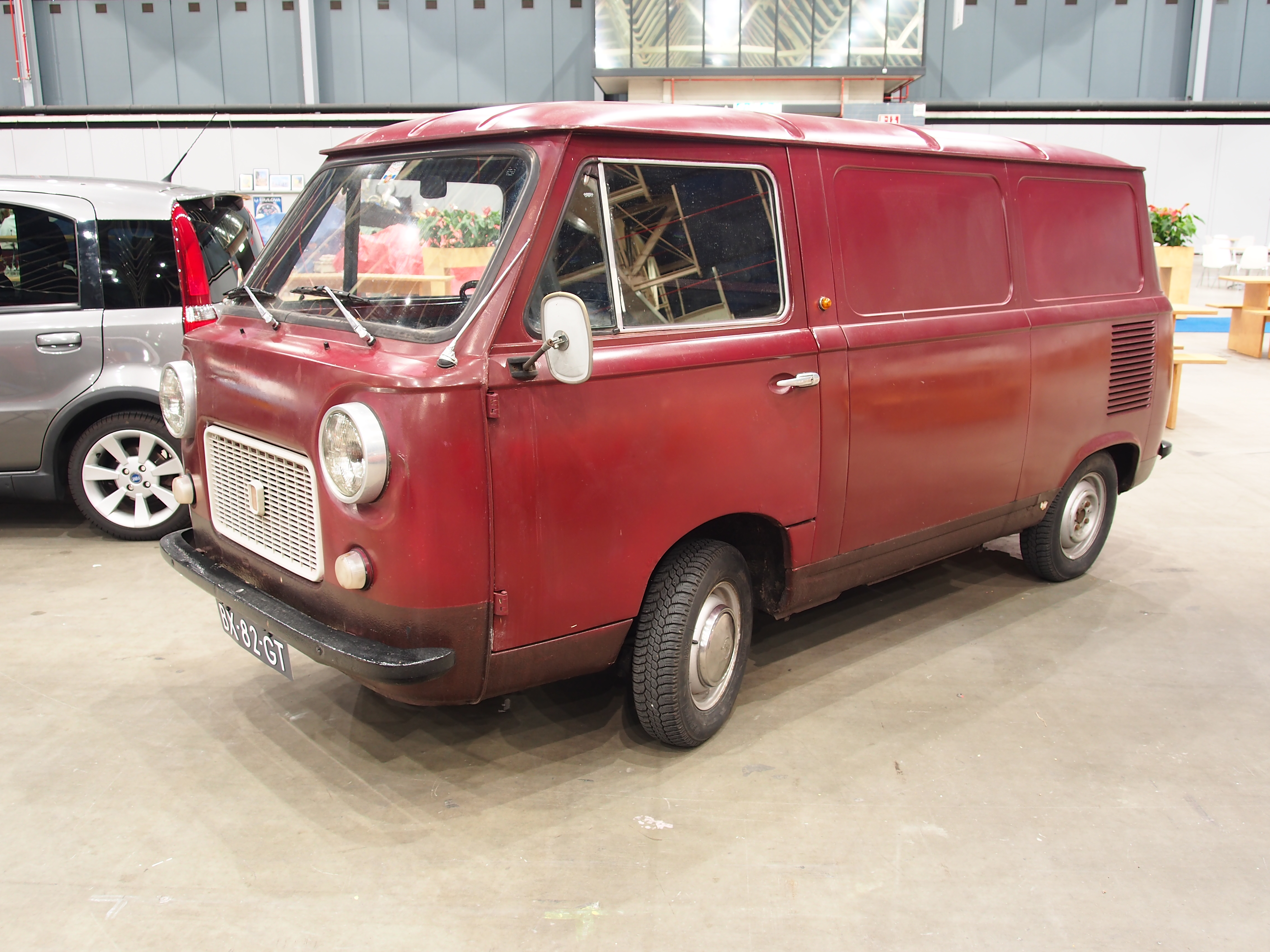
Fiat 850T

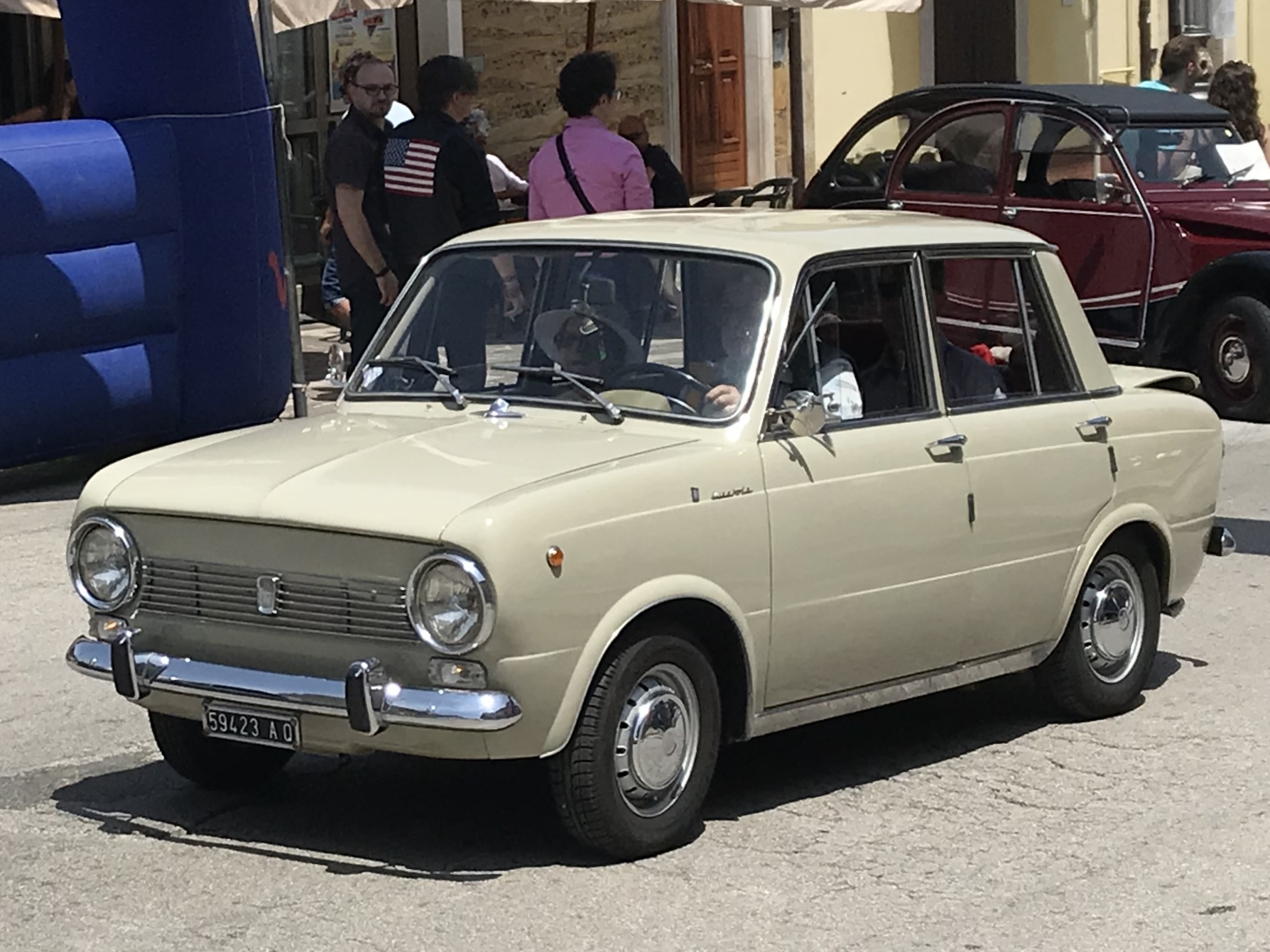
Francis Lombardi made a coachbuilt, four-door derivative called the Lucciola

== Non-Fiat derivatives ==
=== SEAT 850 ===
Spanish manufacturer SEAT also built the 850 into the 1970s. They also offered a four-door saloon derivative in two different iterations. The Fiat 850 was also produced under the name Pirin-Fiat in Lovech, Bulgaria, on the basis of complete knock down (CKD) kits between 1967 and 1971, and at Kilang Pembena Kereta-Kereta (KPKK) in Johor Bahru, Malaysia.

=== Zastava 430 ===
In 1970 Zastava started production of the Zastava 430, which was little more than a slightly cosmetically modified Fiat 850T. Production took place in Sombor, using the same production process as in Kragujevac. The 430 came with a 25 hp (18 kW) 767 cc engine equipped with IPM 28 MGV carburetor. Body variants include: 430K (Minivan), 430F (Panel Van), 430TR (Pickup), 430L (Crew Cab). In 1976 at the Belgrade Car Show, cabriolet and camper variants were presented, using the same 767 cc engine but now with a IPM 30 MGV carburetor, developing 30 hp (22 kW). These concepts never entered production. The following year, a redesign took place based on the new Fiat 900T, marking the end of the Fiat 850T-based Zastava 430. The new design was produced until 1990.

=== Abarth ===
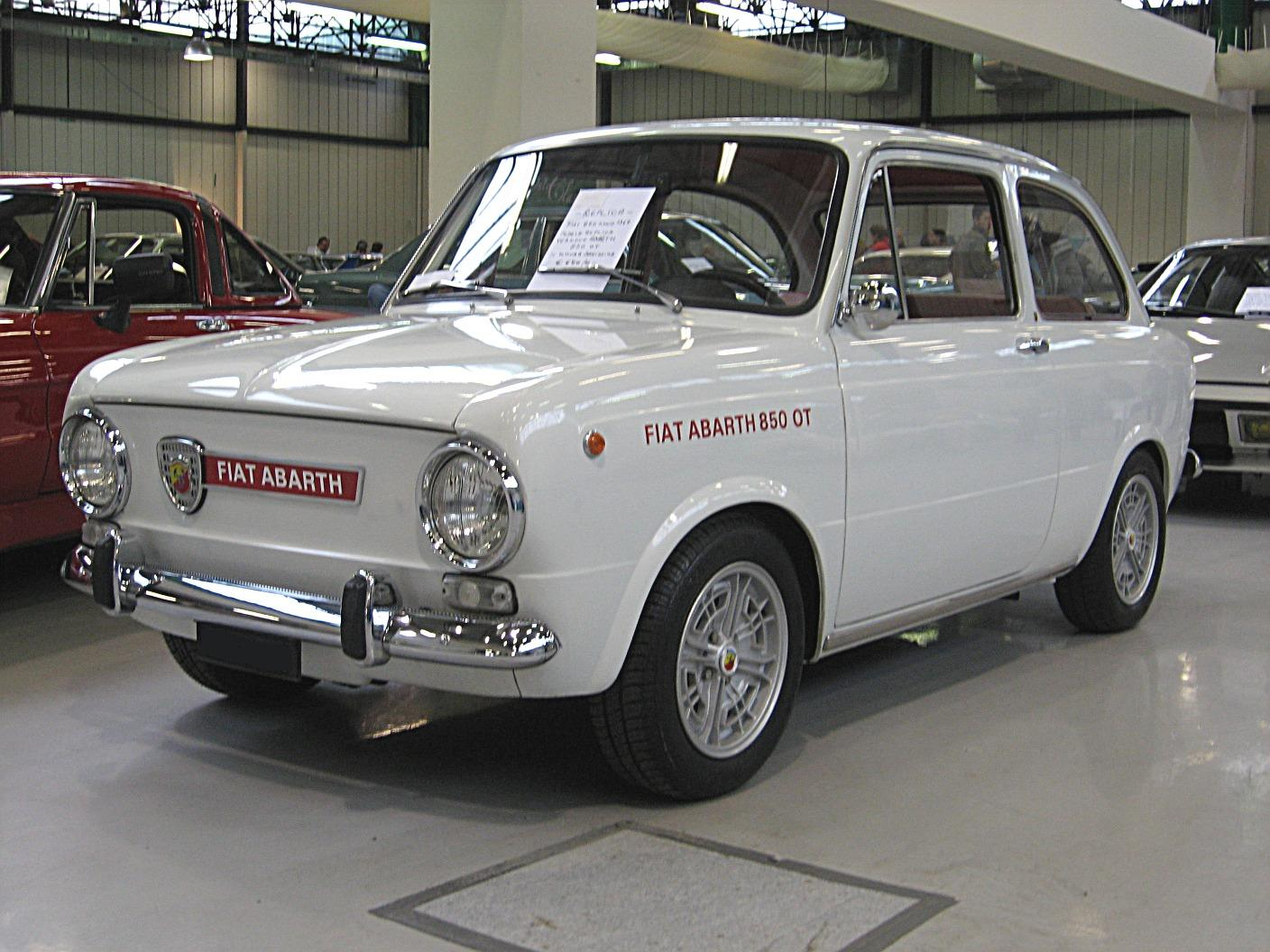
Fiat-Abarth OT 850

Abarth produced several tuned versions of the Berlina, Coupé, and Spider, with ever-increasing displacements. These belonged to the OT series of Abarth cars—standing for Omologato Turismo or "touring homologated", a name also used for a series of two-seater competition cars built on the Simca 1000 floorpan.

- Fiat-Abarth OT 850 Berlina (model 101): Abarth's first 850 derivative, introduced in July 1964. Its Tipo 201 engine was the regular saloon's 847 cc inline-four brought from 34 to 44 hp (25 to 32 kW); top speed went up accordingly from 120 km/h (75 mph) to 130 km/h (81 mph). The OT 850 could be distinguished from the standard Fiat model by its Abarth badging, an asymmetric front ornament with the Abarth shield on the right hand side and the "Fiat Abarth" script on a red field on the left, and wheels with cooling slots. From October of the same year it became available in two guises: OT 850 Oltre 130 ("Over 130"), almost unchanged from the initial model, and OT 850 Oltre 150, with a 53 PS (39 kW; 52 bhp) engine, front disc brakes and a 150 km/h (93 mph) top speed.
- Fiat-Abarth OT 1000 Berlina: introduced in October 1964. Engine displacement increased to 982 cc, it produced 61 hp (45 kW) and 79 N⋅m (58 lb⋅ft) of torque. Front brakes were changed to disks.

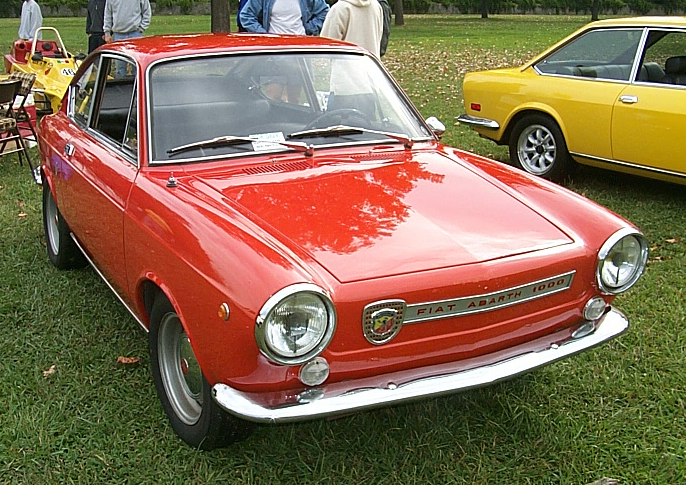
Fiat-Abarth OT 1000 Coupé

- Fiat-Abarth OT 1000 Coupé and Spider: introduced in October 1965. Compared with the saloon version, the engine was a more powerful Tipo 202 producing 62 hp (46 kW) and 79 N⋅m (58 lb⋅ft) of torque. Top speed was 155 km/h (96 mph) for the coupé and 160 km/h (99 mph) for the spider. The coupé was facelifted in November 1968 concurrently with the regular Fiat 850 Coupé, receiving a full-width grille and twin round tail lamps.
- Fiat-Abarth OTR 1000 Coupe: launched alongside the OT 1000 Coupé, and based on the 850 Coupé bodyshell as well. Its type 200 engine had an all-new Abarth-designed cylinder head with valves arranged in a V instead of parallel—hence the R in the name, standing for Radiale, radial. The combustion chambers were shaped as two spherical caps, one around each valve; there was an inlet duct per cylinder, each fed by one choke of the two twin Solex carburettors. Abarth claimed an output of 75 hp (55 kW) at 6500 rpm and a top speed of 172 km/h (107 mph) for the road version. The OTR was set apart from the OT 1000 Coupé by a rectangular front grille bearing the Abarth badge, needed for the front-mounted radiator.

At the 1965 Turin Motor Show Bertone showed on its stand a one-off OTR 1000 berlinetta, based on the 850 Spider but with a fixed roof and a front radiator opening. Suffering the competition of less expensive and less complex OT models, production of the OTR 1000 ended with the arrival of the restyled 850 Coupé in 1968.

- Fiat-Abarth OTS 1000 Coupe: introduced in April 1966. OTR 1000 bodyshell, but standard head OT 1000 engine with output upped to 68 hp (50 kW) and top speed to 160 km/h (99 mph). FIA homologated it in the GT class in 1966. Abarth later developed several modifications, including a new inlet manifold for two twin-choke Solex carburettors. This gave birth to the OTSS 1000 or OT 1000 SS. Both OTS and OTSS were restyled in November 1968 like the OT 1000.

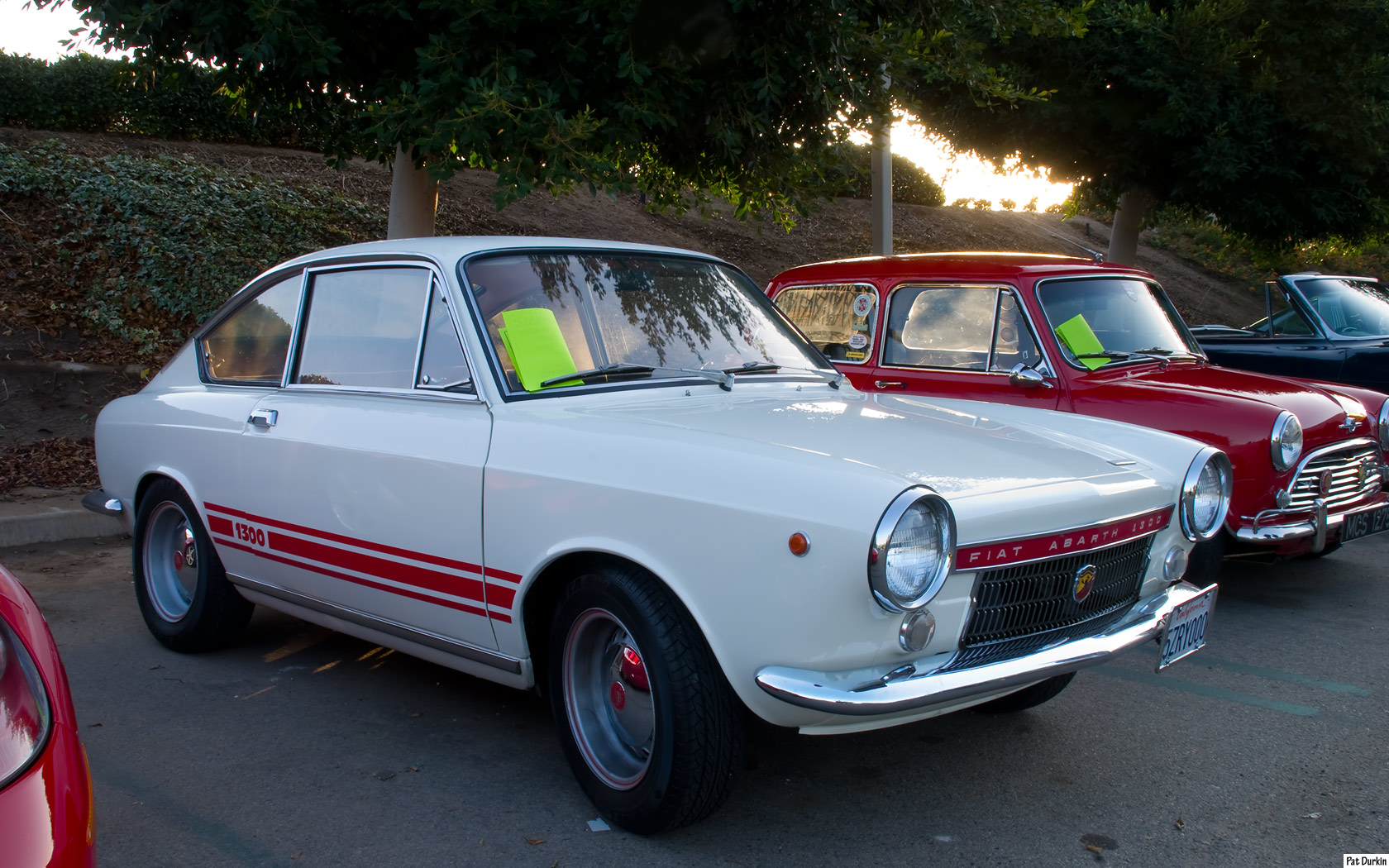
Fiat-Abarth OT 1300 Coupé

- Fiat-Abarth OT 1300 Coupe: November 1966 launch. Visually identical to the OTR 1000 save for the widened 5½-inch wheels, it used a bored out Fiat 124 series engine displacing 1280 cc. The car also received a different carburetor and sharper cams, raising engine power to 75 hp (55 kW) at 6000 rpm. Claimed top speed is 172 km/h (107 mph), the same as for the equally powerful OTR 1000, but thanks to the simpler engine the car was cheaper and more pliable as an everyday drive. Restyled in 1968 together with the 1.0-litre OTs.

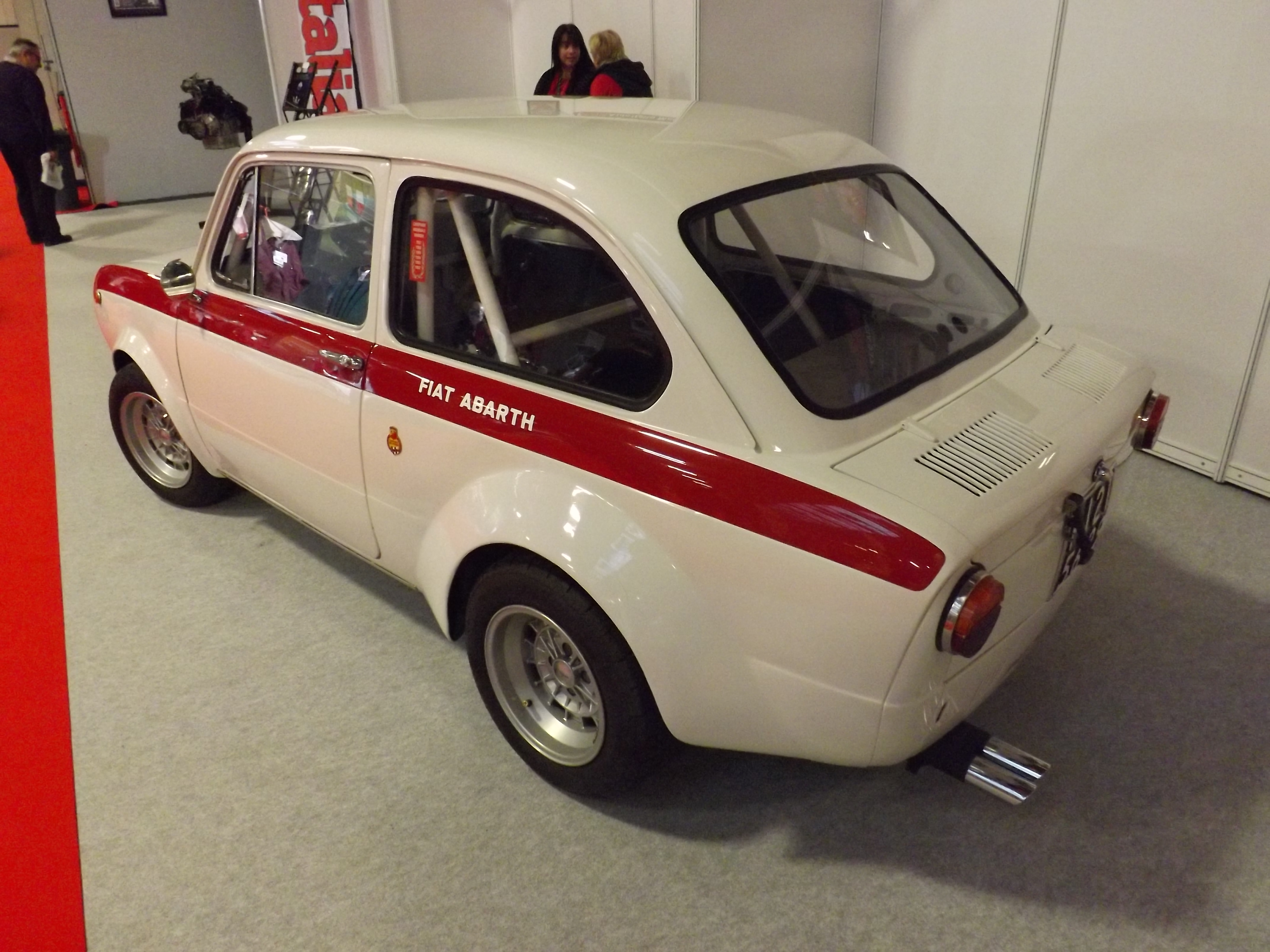
Fiat-Abarth OT 1600 replica

- Fiat Abarth OT 1600 Berlina (model 136/C): an extreme variant based on the 850 saloon body, unveiled at the October 1964 Turin Motor Show. It was fitted with a Tipo 236 1592 cc twin cam, twin spark engine from the Fiat-Abarth 1600 Sport racing car. The 1.6-litre put out 155 hp (114 kW) and top speed was 220 km/h (137 mph). The rear wings were greatly enlarged to clear wide rear alloy wheels. Four examples were produced, all in beige color with red stripes.
- Fiat-Abarth OT 2000 Berlina Mostra because of the OT 1600's good reception from the automotive press, Carlo Abarth decided to create an even more extreme variant based on the 850 saloon body. One of the four OT 1600 was stripped down, painted white with red stripes and equipped with the 1946 cc engine from a 1965 Simca Abarth 2000 GT Corsa. Mostra means "display" in Italian. Its 2.0-liter twin-cam four-cylinder produced 209 hp (154 kW) and made for a claimed maximum speed of 252 km/h (157 mph). The rear badging on the car read "OT Fiat Abarth 2mila", two thousand. Fiat didn't give a green light for the OT 1600 nor the OT Mostra, so both projects were stillborn.

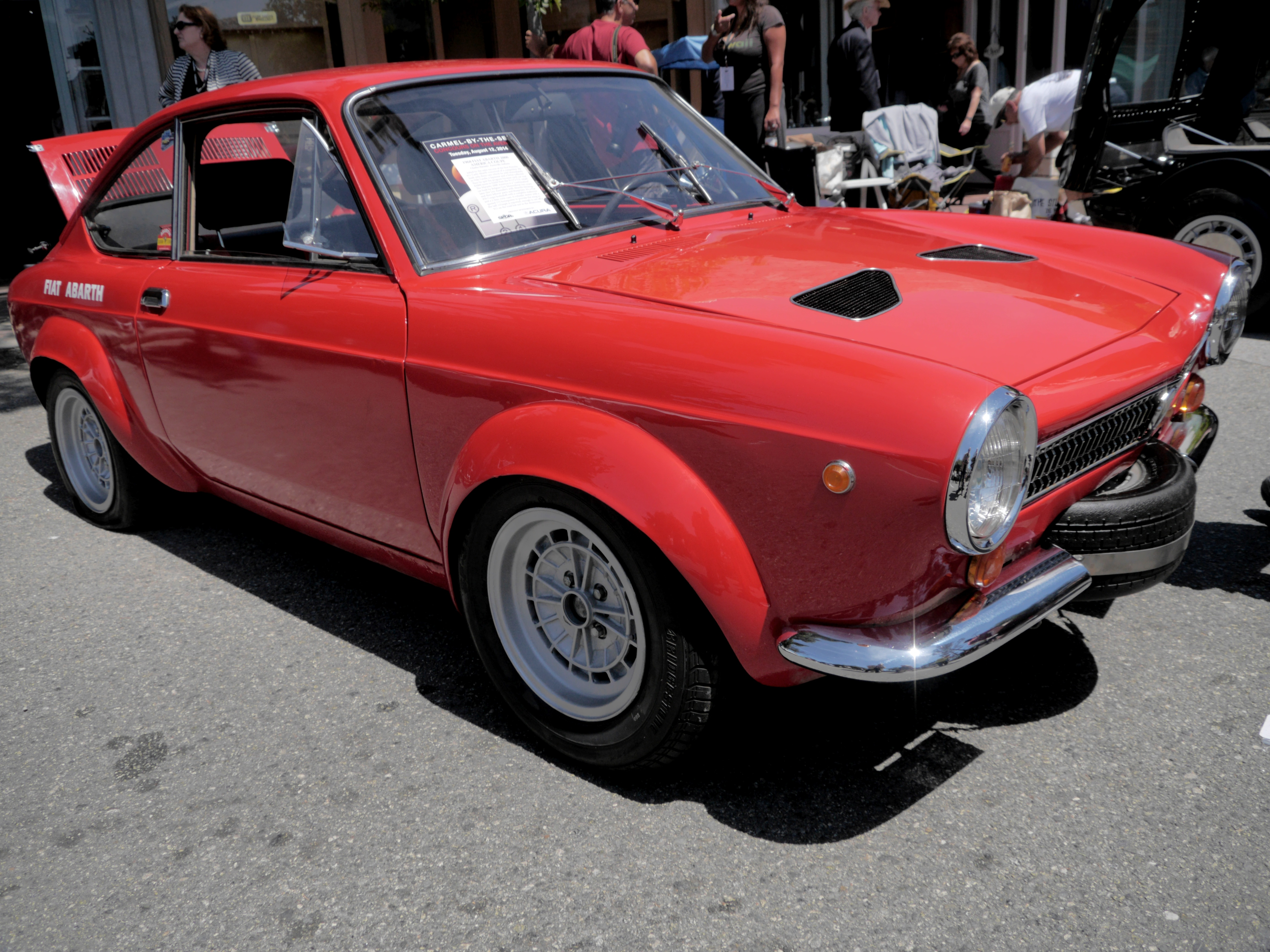
Fiat-Abarth OT 2000 Coupe America

- Fiat-Abarth OT 2000 Coupé America: introduced in February 1966, it was based on the 850 Coupé but powered by a two-litre engine. It differed visually from the 850 Coupé in having a barred grille between the headlights, a split front bumper flanking a spare wheel which projected forward below the grille, widened front and rear tracks and wings, and a vented front bonnet. The 1946 cc twin cam four-cylinder produced 185 hp (136 kW) and could propel the car to 240 km/h (149 mph). Three examples were produced. This car should not be confused with the Fiat Abarth OT 2000 Periscopio Group 4 sports car, or the later OT 2000 Coupé (sports prototype); although all of these cars share the same engine.

=== Francis Lombardi Grand Prix ===
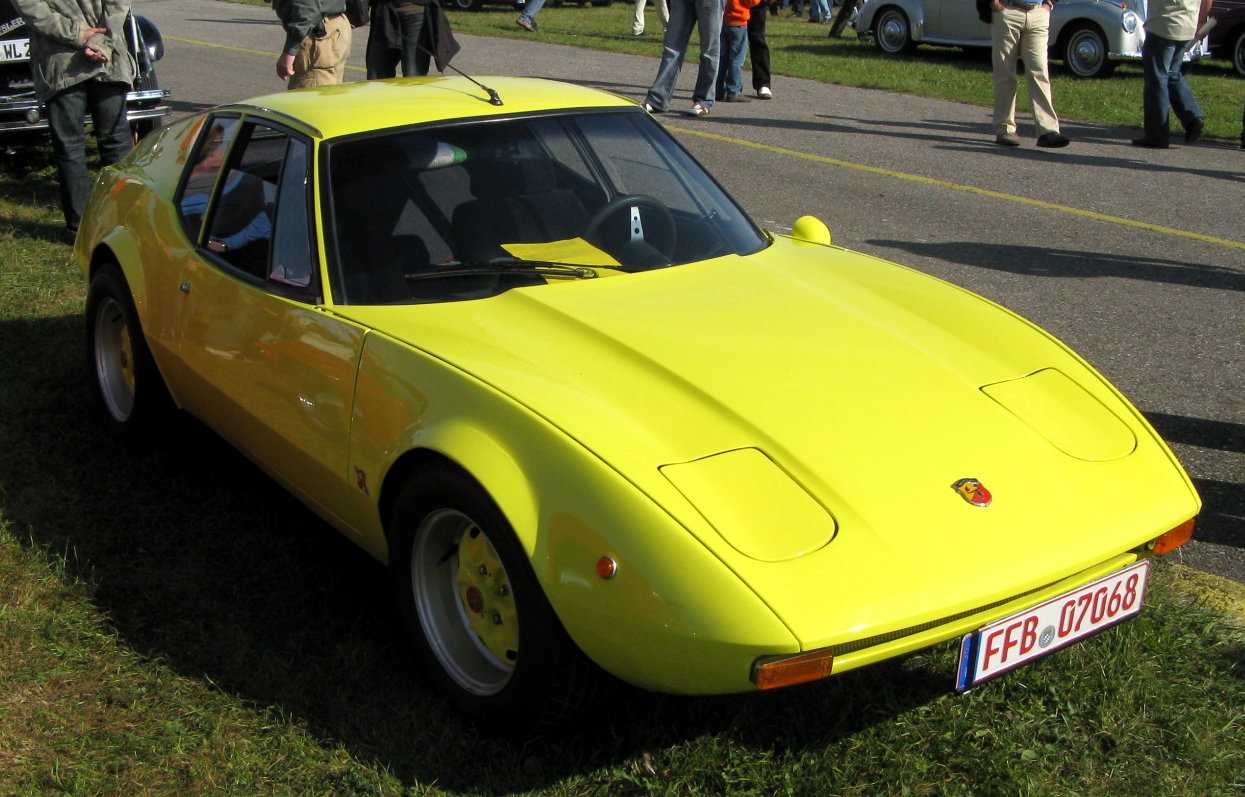
Francis Lombardi Grand Prix

Italian coachbuilder designed and built a small sports car with fastback coupé body based on the 850, the 1968 Francis Lombardi Grand Prix. The car was also marketed by OTAS as the OTAS 820, equipped with Giannini engines, and in an Abarth version, the Abarth Scorpione.

=== Michelotti Shellette ===
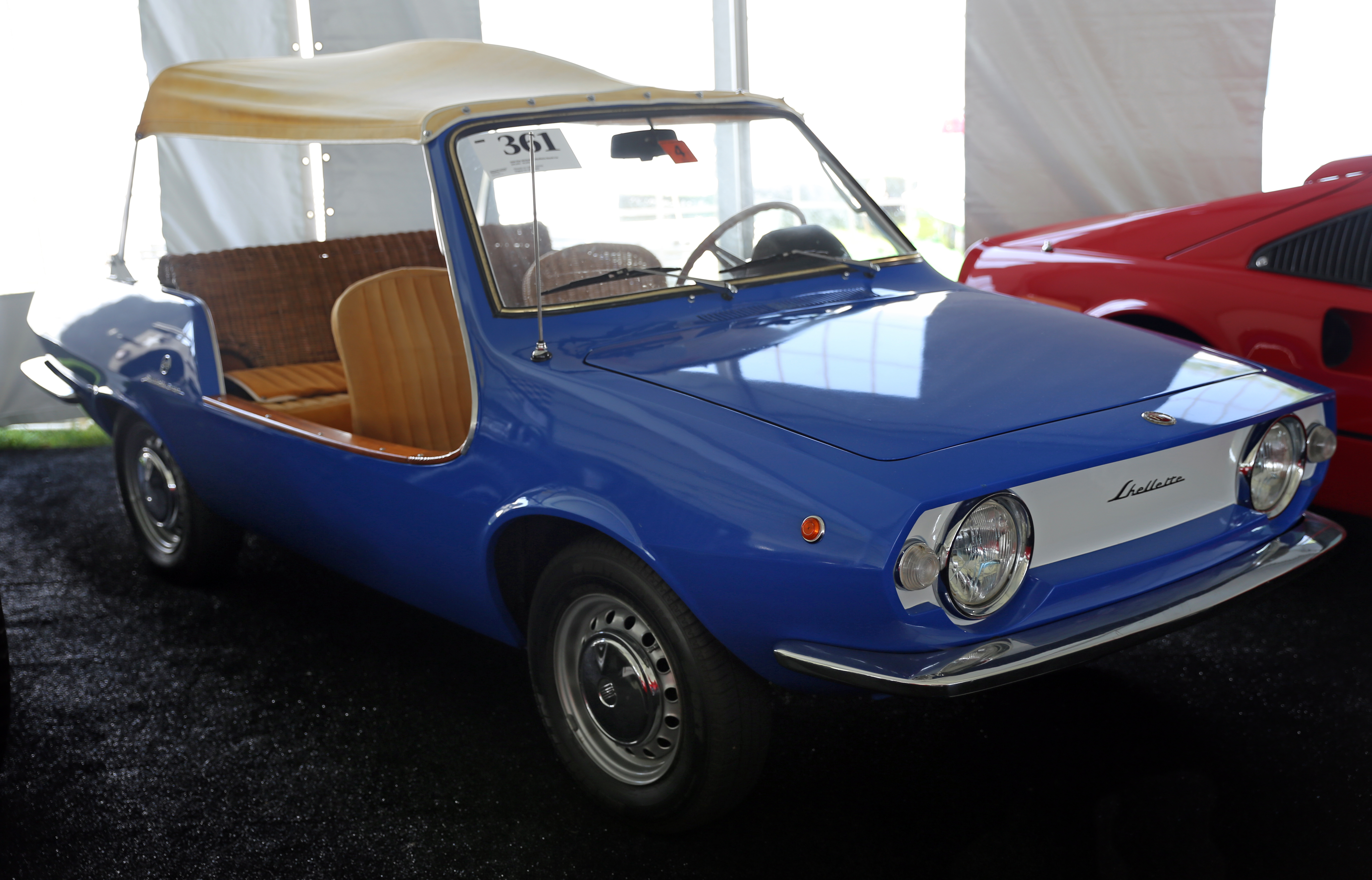
1969 Michelotti Shellette

The Michelotti Shellette was a beach car based on the 850, styled and built by Giovanni Michelotti. Designed in the mould of Ghia's 500 and 600-based "Jolly", it was a more useful proposition, being faster and better equipped. Only about 80 were built, with the two first ones using DAF 33 underpinnings. The Shellette had the more powerful 47 PS (35 kW) engine of the Special/Coupé.

=== Siata Spring ===
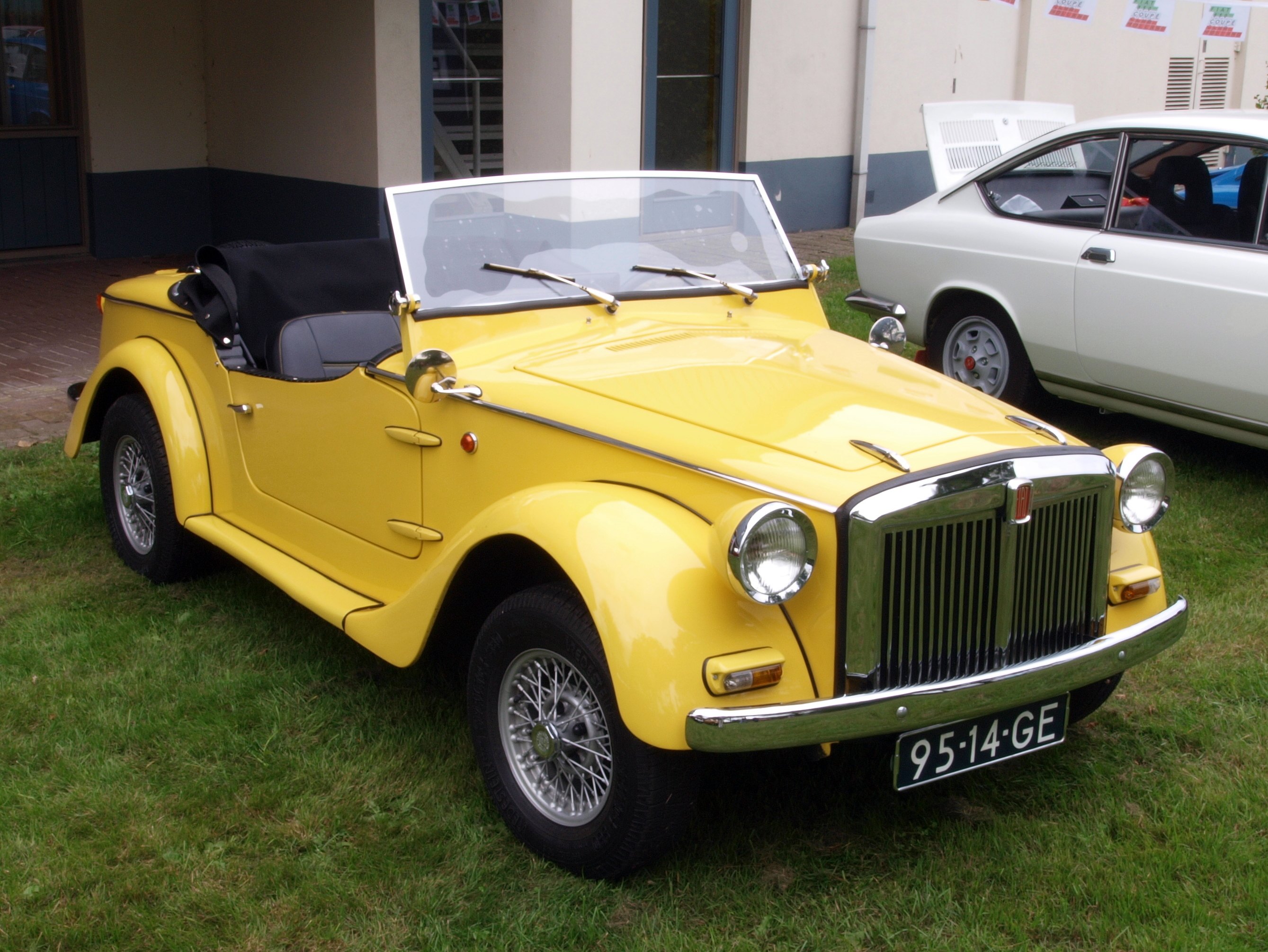
Siata Spring

The Siata Spring was a 2-seater roadster built by Siata on the basis of the 850. Introduced in 1967, it featured retro styling with a mock upright radiator grille, separate wings and headlights, and running boards. In Italy it was initially priced at 795,000 Lire, 255,000 Lire cheaper than Fiat's Bertone 850 Spider. Top speed was 125 km/h (78 mph). The Spring was produced until 1970, with a total of around 3500 cars built, when Siata went bankrupt. The assembly line was then purchased by a newly formed company called ORSA (Officina Realizzazioni Sarde Automobili), who moved it to an assembly plant near Cagliari, where they resumed production. Now based on the SEAT 850 Especial, the engine displacement increased to 903 cc with 47 hp (35 kW), and it gained disc brakes on the front wheels and a higher top speed of 125 km/h (78 mph). Due to the 1973 oil crisis, sales of sports cars in Italy declined, forcing ORSA to end production in spring 1975.
