= Fiat 900T =

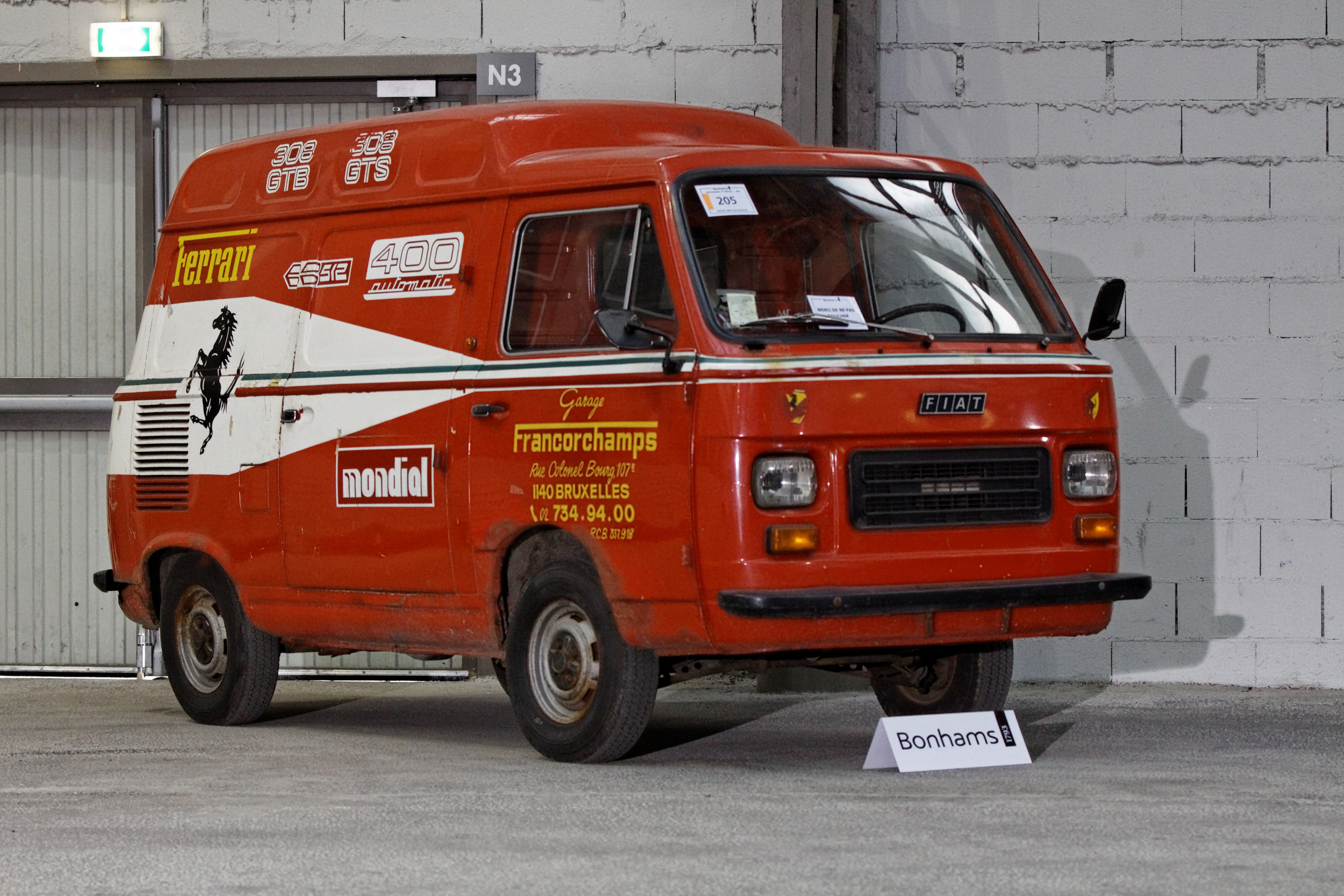

Overview
- Manufacturer: Fiat
- Also called: Fiat 900E; Fiat Citivan (United Kingdom); Zastava 900 (Yugoslavia)
- Production: 1976–1985

Powertrain
- Engine: 903 cc 100 GL.000 OHV I4

Dimensions
- Wheelbase: 2,000 mm (78.7 in)
- Length: 3,750 mm (147.6 in)
- Width: 1,520 mm (59.8 in)
- Height: 1,740 mm (68.5 in)
- Kerb weight: 835–900 kg (1,841–1,984 lb)

Chronology
- Predecessor: Fiat 850T; Fiat 1100T

The Fiat 900T was a small van produced by the Italian automobile manufacturer Fiat between 1976 and 1985, replacing the similar Fiat 850T. It was first presented in November 1976, at the Turin Show. In the UK, it was sold as the Fiat Citivan.

While using many of the 850T's body panels, the roof was taller and the front clip was also redesigned. The taller roof also allowed for a larger front windshield, increasing in height by 6 cm (2.4 in). The new front had rectangular headlamps and featured a new grille as well. The 900T was equipped with 12-inch wheels borrowed from the Fiat 126, albeit fitted with wider rims. The bumpers were also redesigned as was the interior, which sported the steering wheel from the contemporary Fiat 127 Special. The 900T was available in a number of variants, including a seven-seat minibus (Pulmino in Italy), and the Shango camper van; British buyers could choose between the Amigo and Pandora campers. Typical bodystyles included a panel van, high-roof panel van, promiscuo (glazed van with rear seating), and the minibus. The van and promiscuo could also be had with a sliding side door or an additional rear driver's side door.

== Specifications ==
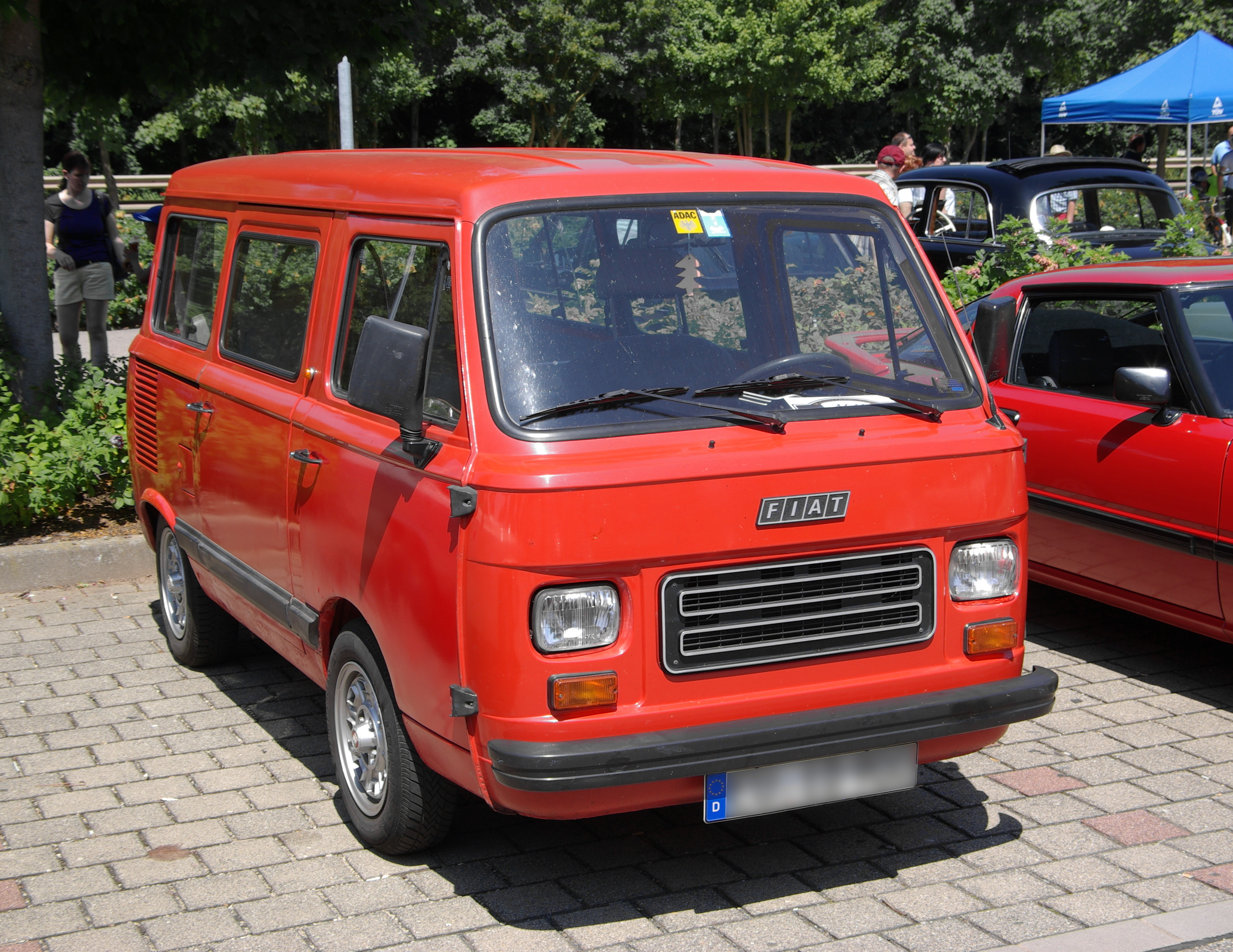
Fiat 900E (minibus)

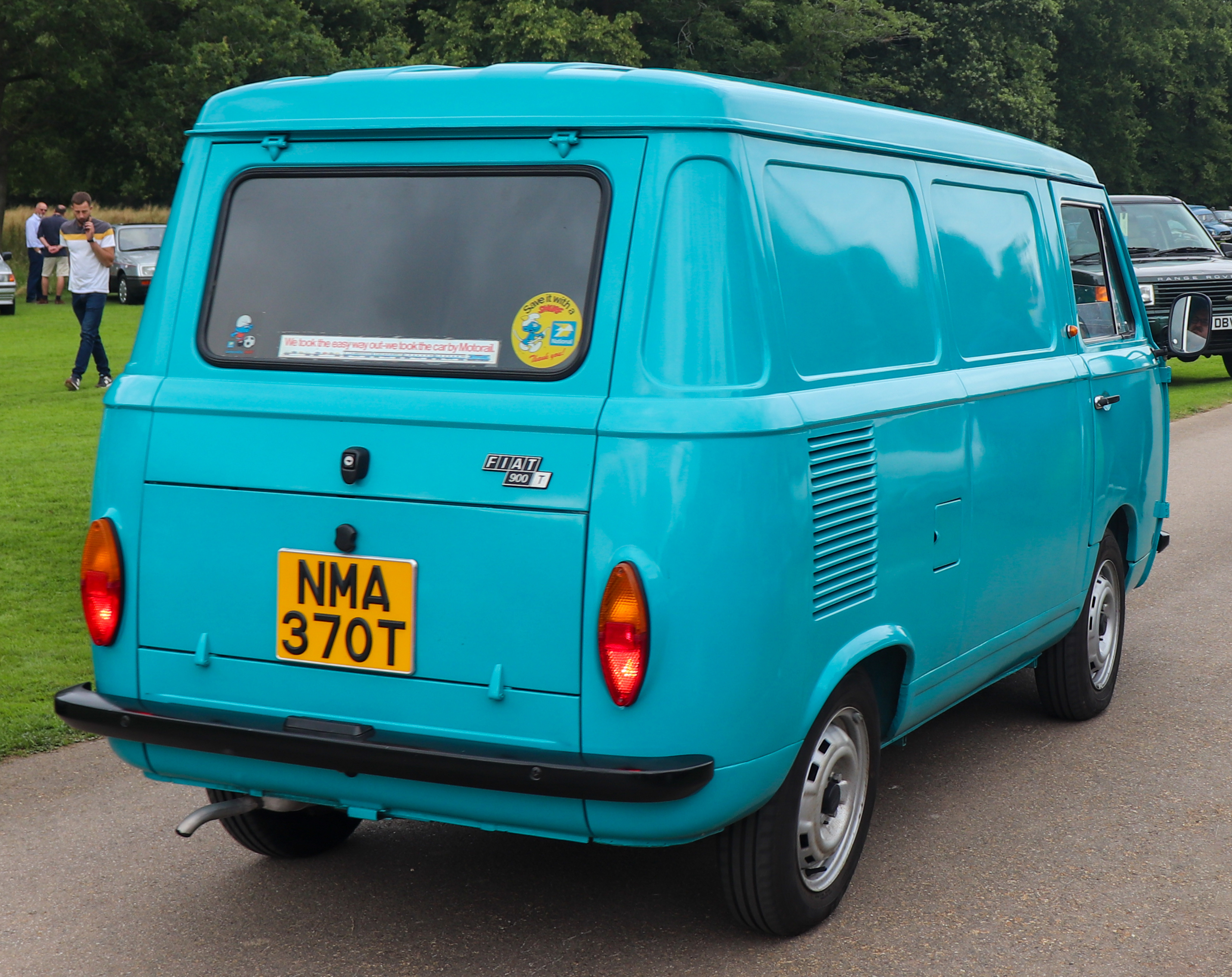
Fiat 900T Rear

The 900T was powered by a rear-mounted, four-cylinder 903 cc petrol engine, shared with the Fiat 127. In the 900T, it produced 35 bhp (26 kW; 35 PS) at 4,500 rpm and 44.84 lb⋅ft (61 N⋅m) at 3,300 rpm. The 850T's dynamo was replaced by a more modern alternator. The 900T has a small turning circle of 9 metres (29 ft 6.5 in).

The van was originally fitted with drum brakes all around. The standard van's luggage compartment could hold 2,650 L (93.6 cu ft).

== 900T elettrico ==
In October 1979, Fiat introduced an electric version of the 900T. It was developed in collaboration with ENEL and had a 135 Ah battery capacity. The batteries were placed under the floor, between the axes, and could be pulled out easily for charging. With its 14 kW engine, the electric 900T could reach a top speed of 60 km/h. In city use, the range was 55 km, at a constant speed of 50 km/h the range would be 80 km. The cargo volume was the same as that of the ICE-version, but now the cargo floor was completely flat. The total weight of the electric van was 1857 kg when fully loaded. A year later, an improved version was presented, amongst others with an onboard charging unit.

== 900E (1980) ==
In 1980, the 900T was updated and renamed the 900E. The wheels were changed to units borrowed from the Fiat 128, new black bumpers were larger and more square, the taillights were now rectangular units from the Fiat 238/242, while front disc brakes were fitted and the interior revised using many parts from the recently updated Fiat 127 (second series).

== Zastava 435/850A/900A ==
In 1977 Zastava redesigned the Zastava 430, using the basis of the Fiat 900T. The biggest mechanical update was the use of a IPM 30 MGV carburetor, bumping up the power of the 767cc engine from 25hp to 30hp. The name was changed to Zastava 435. Body variants included: 435K (Minivan), 435F (Panel Van), 435FP (Panel Van with windows), 435T (Pickup), 435FM (Police vehicle), 435S (Ambulance). In 1980, the 435 was slightly updated, getting a coolant temperature gauge, and new taillights. That year the 435 gained the engine from the new Zastava 850, a 847cc unit developing 32hp, and was renamed to Zastava 850A. In 1985, the engine was changed to a 903cc 45hp unit, borrowed from the Yugo 45. The name was changed to Zastava 900A. A new better equipped model was also presented, called the 900AL (L standing for Luxury). This included: front seat headrests, better quality seats, better sound isolation, and black anti-glare plastic dashboard. Production of all variants ended in 1990.

== Models ==
The 900E minibus was discontinued without a direct successor in 1981. Fiat kept producing the cargo versions until 1986, by which time Japanese microvans and trucks had taken over this market segment.

Fiat didn't produce pickups at the time so third party coach builders, including Coriasco and Fissore, would purchase 900T vans from the Fiat factory and convert them into pickups (and campers). These companies cut away the rear body and added panels as needed to complete the conversion, and then re-sprayed the car in the original color. Coriasco and Fissore stamped the rear of the body with their own vehicle identification number to the right of the original Fiat VIN, the numbers then being combined into a longer vehicle identification number on the title. The pickup version was very similar to the Volkswagen Combi, with a raised rear bed, removable bed walls, and large storage area accessible from either side underneath.
