= 1999 Monte Carlo Rally =

1999 Monte Carlo Rally 67th Rallye Automobile de Monte-Carlo
Round 1 of 14 in the 1999 World Rally Championship
← Previous event	Next event →
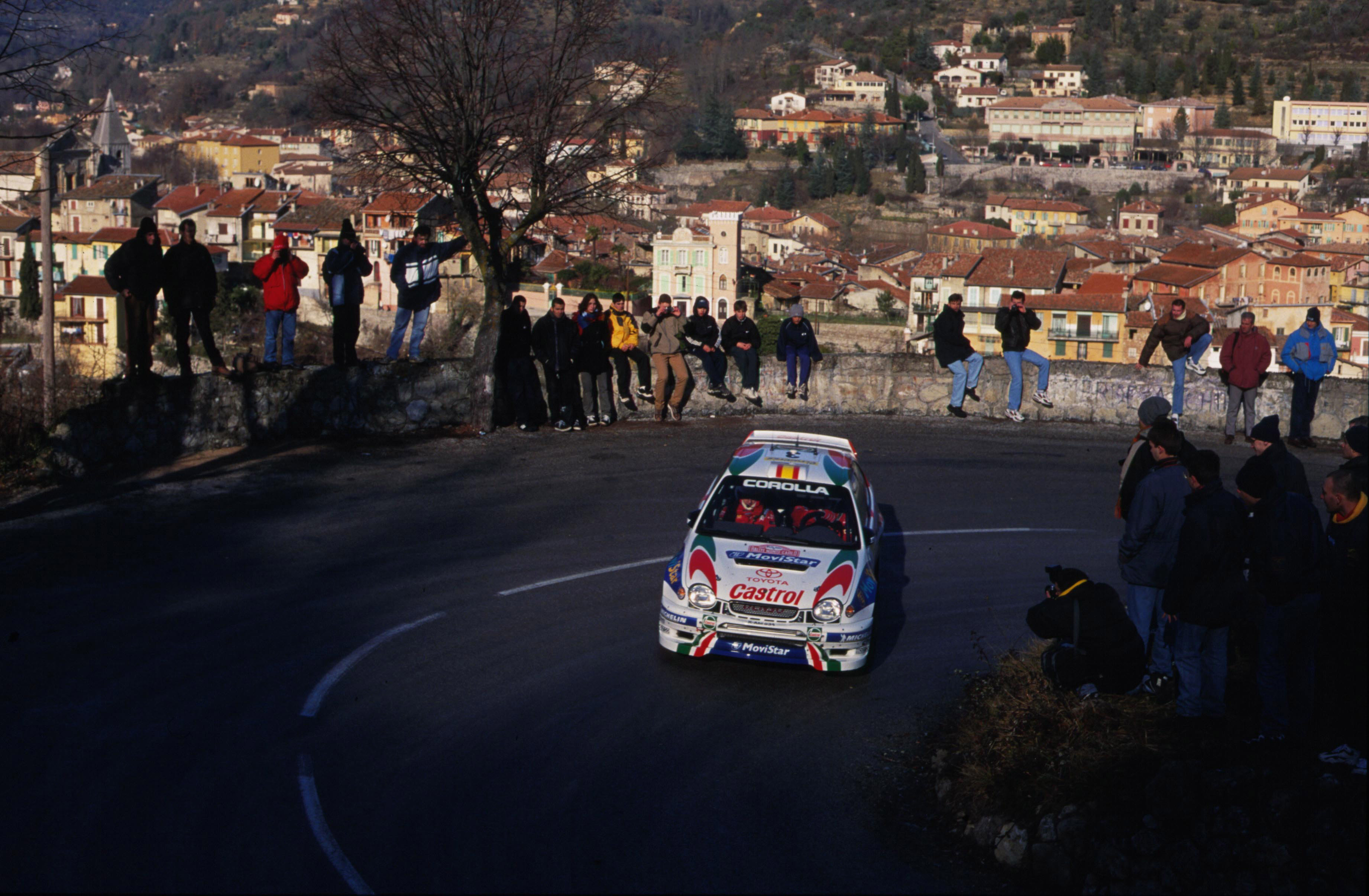
- Carlos Sainz Sr. and Luis Moya's Toyota Corolla WRC
- Host country: Monaco
- Rally base: Monte Carlo
- Dates run: 18 – 20 January 1999
- Stages: 14 (424.69 km; 263.89 miles)
- Stage surface: Tarmac, Snow
- Transport distance: 1,188.51 km (738.51 miles)
- Overall distance: 1,613.20 km (1,002.40 miles)

Statistics
- Crews registered: 86
- Crews: 86 at start, 46 at finish

Overall results
- Overall winner: (Finland) Tommi Makinen (Finland) Risto Mannisenmaki (Japan) Marlboro Mitsubishi Ralliart; 5:16:50.6

The 1999 Monte Carlo Rally (formally known as the Rallye Automobile de Monte-Carlo 1999) was a motor racing event for rally cars that was held over three days between 18 and 20 January 1999. It marked the 67th running of the Monte Carlo Rally, and was the first round of the 1999 World Rally Championship season. The 1999 event was based in the city-state of Monaco and was contested over fourteen special stages, covering a total competitive distance of 424.69km (263.89 miles).

Tommi Makinen was the defending world rally champion, as was Team Mitsubishi Ralliart. Peugeot Esso would not compete in the event. The Ford Motor Co Ltd entries would be excluded from the final results after an illegal water pump was discovered.

Makinen, along with co-driver Risto Mannisenmaki won the rally, their first win since the 1998 Rally Australia, putting them in the lead of the championship.

== Background ==
=== Entry list ===
The following crews were set to enter the rally. The event was open to crews competing in the World Rally Championship, as well as privateer entries that were not registered to score points in the manufacturer's championship. Twelve were entered under Group A regulations to compete in the World Rally Championship's Manufacturers' Championship.

Group A entries competing in the World Rally Championship
No.	Driver	Co-Driver	Entrant	Car	Tyre
1	(Finland) Tommi Makinen	(Finland) Risto Mannisenmaki	(Japan) Marlboro Mitsubishi Ralliart	Mitsubishi Lancer Evo VI	MI
2	(Belgium) Freddy Loix	(Belgium) Sven Smeets	(Japan) Marlboro Mitsubishi Ralliart	Mitsubishi Lancer Evo VI	MI
3	(Spain) Carlos Sainz Sr.	(Spain) Luis Moya	(Japan) Toyota Castrol Team	Toyota Corolla WRC	MI
4	(France) Didier Auriol	(France) Denis Giraudet	(Japan) Toyota Castrol Team	Toyota Corolla WRC	MI
5	(United Kingdom) Richard Burns	(United Kingdom) Robert Reid	(Japan) Subaru World Rally Team	Subaru Impreza S5 WRC 99	P
6	(Finland) Juha Kankkunen	(Finland) Juha Repo	(Japan) Subaru World Rally Team	Subaru Impreza S5 WRC 99	P
7	(United Kingdom) Colin McRae	(United Kingdom) Nicky Grist	(United Kingdom) Ford Motor Co Ltd	Ford Focus WRC 99	MI
8	(France) Simon Jean-Joseph	(United Kingdom) Fred Gallagher	(United Kingdom) Ford Motor Co Ltd	Ford Focus WRC 99	MI
9	(Finland) Harri Rovanpera	(Finland) Risto Pietilainen	(Spain) SEAT Sport	SEAT Cordoba WRC	P
10	(Italy) Piero Liatti	(Italy) Carlo Cassina	(Spain) SEAT Sport	SEAT Cordoba WRC	P
11	(Germany) Armin Schwarz	(Germany) Manfred Hiemer	(Czech Republic) Skoda Motorsport	Skoda Octavia WRC	MI
12	(Czech Republic) Pavel Sibera	(Czech Republic) Petr Gross	(Czech Republic) Skoda Motorsport	Skoda Octavia WRC	MI

=== Itinerary ===
All dates and times are CET (UTC+1).

Date	No.	Time span	Stage name	Distance
17 January		14:20	Service A, La Scoperta	—N/a
17 January		18:40	Service B, Tallard	—N/a
18 January		8:00	Service C, Tallard	—N/a
18 January	SS1	8:30	Plan de Vitrolles - Faye	48.28 km
18 January		9:41	Service D, Laragne	—N/a
18 January	SS2	10:41	L'Epine - Rosans	31.15 km
18 January		12:20	Service E, Buis-les-Baronnies	—N/a
18 January	SS3	13:16	Ruissas - Eygalayes	27.56 km
18 January		15:12	Service F, Tallard	—N/a
18 January	SS4	16:18	Prunieres - Embrun	33.82 km
18 January	SS5	17:20	St. Clement - St. Saveur	20.35 km
18 January		18:47	Service G, Tallard	—N/a
19 January		7:30	Service H, Tallard	—N/a
19 January	SS6	8:21	BIF. C1/D1 - Bayons	32.52 km
19 January		9:52	Service I, Tallard	—N/a
19 January	SS7	11:05	Sisteron - Thoard	36.72 km
19 January		13:19	Service J, St Andre les Alpes	—N/a
19 January	SS8	14:26	Entrevaux - St. Pierre	30.73 km
19 January		16:36	Service K, La Scoperta	—N/a
19 January	SS9	17:46	Sospel - La Bollene 1	33.65 km
19 January	SS10	18:37	Lantosque - Luceram 1	20.87 km
19 January		19:39	Service L, La Scoperta	—N/a
20 January		7:20	Service M, La Scoperta	—N/a
20 January	SS11	8:20	Sospel - La Bollene 2	33.65 km
20 January	SS12	9:11	Lantosque - Luceram 2	20.87 km
20 January		10:28	Service N, La Scoperta	—N/a
20 January	SS13	11:23	Sospel - La Bollene 3	33.65 km
20 January	SS14	12:14	Lantosque - Luceram 3	20.87 km
20 January		13:16	Service O, La Scoperta	—N/a

== Report ==
=== Summary ===
The drama began before the first stage, as Schwarz' Skoda suffered clutch issues before even making it to the ceremonial start ramp. As a result, Skoda pulled out both of their cars before the event began.

Monday's stages would be covered by an overcast and scattered rain showers would permeate the day. Makinen would start the day with the lead despite some minor brake issues experienced in the first stage. Sainz would go off the road in the first corner, damaging his car and causing a retirement later in the stage. Auriol and Burns would also suffer damage in the first stage, but would make it through. Mitsubishi driver Loix would also retire in the first stage, bringing the Mitsubishi and Toyota's numbers down to one each. McRae suffered from a fire in the first stage, but was able to continue. He would later suffer from a broken windscreen when he hit a group of spectators. Meanwhile, it was privateer Panizzi who was challenging Makinen for the lead, and he would take it by stage 4 and end the day with it, while McRae would take the win in the final two stages of the day.

Saturday would be a battle of tyre choice, as Makinen claimed Panizzi had made a better choice than him. But on stage 8, Panizzi would run into both mechanical and driving issues, while Makinen got the tyre choice right, leading to Makinen taking the lead back on the stage. The final two stages of the day would be run at night, atop the famous Col de Turini. Multiple drivers, especially non-French drivers, complained about spectators throwing snow on the road. Makinen would lead at the end of the day.

Sunday would start with Panizzi retiring from the event on the first stage after sliding on black ice and flipping the car; the damage was too severe to continue. McRae would get a stage win, but the progress would be undone by transmission issues rendering his Subaru front-wheel drive for stage 11. Didier Auriol would take two stage wins on the day, moving him up the order. Stage 13 would be the first ever stage win for SEAT, taken by Rovanpera. But in the end, it would be Makinen with the win. The Fords would later be disqualified from the event due to an illegal water pump, promoting Auriol to third.

==== Classification ====
Position	No.	Driver	Co-driver	Entrant	Car	Time	Difference	Points
1	1	(Finland) Tommi Makinen	(Finland) Risto Mannisenmaki	(Japan) Marlboro Mitsubishi Ralliart	Mitsubishi Lancer Evo VI	5:16:50.6	0.0	10
2	6	(Finland) Juha Kankkunen	(Finland) Juha Repo	(Japan) Subaru World Rally Team	Subaru Impreza S5 WRC 99	5:18:35.3	+1:44.7	6
3	4	(France) Didier Auriol	(France) Denis Giraudet	(Japan) Toyota Castrol Team	Toyota Corolla WRC	5:20:43.4	+3:52.8	4
4	19	(France) Francois Delecour	(France) Dominique Savignoni	(France) Francois Delecour	Ford Escort WRC	5:20:51.8	+4:01.2	3
5	16	(Belgium) Bruno Thiry	(Belgium) Stephane Prevot	(Japan) Subaru World Rally Team	Subaru Impreza S5 WRC 99	5:20:53.1	+4:02.5	2
6	10	(Italy) Piero Liatti	(Italy) Carlo Cassina	(Spain) SEAT Sport	SEAT Cordoba WRC	5:23:48.7	+6:58.1	1
7	9	(Finland) Harri Rovanpera	(Finland) Risto Pietilainen	(Spain) SEAT Sport	SEAT Cordoba WRC	5:23:52.9	+7:02.3	0
8	5	(United Kingdom) Richard Burns	(United Kingdom) Robert Reid	(Japan) Subaru World Rally Team	Subaru Impreza S5 WRC 99	5:26:15.2	+9:24.6	0
9	21	(Denmark) Henrik Luundgaard	(Denmark) Freddy Pedersen	(Denmark) Henrik Luundgaard	Toyota Corolla WRC	5:30:56.8	+14:06.2	0
10	27	(Belgium) Marc Duez	(France) Philippe Dupuy	(Belgium) Team Gamma	Mitsubishi Carisma GT Evo V	5:43:31.2	+26:40.6	0
11	31	(Italy) Luca Pedersoli	(Italy) Nadia Mazzon	(Italy) Luca Pedersoli	Toyota Celica GT-Four (ST205)	5:46:49.1	+29:58.5	0
12	18	(Uruguay) Gustavo Trelles	(Argentina) Martin Christie	(Italy) Ralliart Italia	Mitsubishi Lancer Evo V	5:51:07.7	+34:17.1	0
13	20	(Germany) Isolde Holderied	(France) Catherine Fracois	(Japan) Toyota Castrol Team	Toyota Corolla WRC	5:53:09.9	+36:19.3	0
14	24	(Finland) Toni Gardemeister	(Finland) Paavo Lukander	(Finland) Toni Gardemeister	SEAT Ibiza Kit Car Evo2	5:53:50.3	+36:59.7	0
15	29	(Monaco) Christophe Spiliotis	(France) Herve Thibaud	(Monaco) Christophe Spiliotis	Subaru Impreza WRX	5:54:59.7	+38:09.1	0
16	64	(France) Christophe Arnaud	(France) Stephane Arnaud	(France) Christophe Arnaud	Subaru Impreza WRX	5:55:41.5	+38:50.9	0
17	38	(Italy) Andrea Maselli	(Italy) Nicola Arena	(Italy) Andrea Maselli	Renault Clio Maxi	5:58:30.9	+41:40.3	0
18	34	(France) Richard Frau	(France) Dominique Le Corre	(France) Richard Frau	Mazda 323 GT-R	6:02:23.9	+45:33.3	0
19	67	(Andorra) Ferran Font	(Spain) Joan Sureda	(Andorra) Ferran Font	Mitsubishi Lancer Evo V	6:03:22.8	+46:32.2	0
20	84	(France) David Truphemus	(France) Pascal Saivre	(France) David Truphemus	Peugeot 306 S16	6:13:16.3	+56:25.7	0
21	80	(Germany) Horst Rotter	(Germany) Volker Schmidt	(Germany) Horst Rotter	Opel Astra GSi 16V	6:14:36.0	+57:45.4	0
22	39	(France) Patrice Rouit	(France) Dominique Lamy	(France) Patrice Rouit	Citroen ZX 16V	6:14:43.1	+57:45.4	0
23	54	(Italy) Giandomenico Basso	(Italy) Flavio Guglielmini	(Italy) Giandomenico Basso	Fiat Seicento	6:15:43.2	+58:52.6	0
24	78	(France) Frederic Maniccia	(France) Richard Thaon	(France) Frederic Maniccia	Renault Clio Williams	6:20:30.4	+1:03:39.8	0
25	51	(Germany) Peter Zehetmaier	(Germany) Bernd Marx	(Germany) Peter Zehetmaier	Fiat Seicento	6:21:30.0	+1:04:39.4	0
26	58	(Greece) Iaveris Jr.	(Greece) Konstantinos Stefanis	(Greece) Iaveris Jr.	Fiat Seicento	6:21:59.7	+1:05:09.1	0
27	65	(Italy) Raffaello Fidanza	(Italy) Flavio Guglielmini	(Italy) Raffaello Fidanza	Mitsubishi Lancer Evo V	6:26:00.7	+1:09:10.1	0
28	87	(Germany) Jurgen Barth	(France) Jean-Claude Perramond	(Germany) Jurgen Barth	Subaru Vivio RX-R	6:26:11.3	+1:09:20.7	0
29	87	(Belgium) Pieter Tsjoen	(Belgium) Steven Vergalle	(Belgium) Pieter Tsjoen	Mitsubishi Lancer Evo IV	6:26:18.3	+1:09:27.7	0
30	52	(San Marino) Jader Vagnini	(San Marino) Silvio Stefanelli	(San Marino) Jader Vagnini	Fiat Seicento	6:27:22.8	+1:10:32.2	0
31	79	(France) Christian Grillerer	(France) Stephane Cambou	(France) Christian Grillerer	Honda Integra Type-R	6:27:35.9	+1:10:45.3	0
32	72	(Italy) Marco Menegatto	(Italy) Enrico Brazzoli	(Italy) Marco Menegatto	Mitsubishi Lancer Evo V	6:31:28.1	+1:14:37.5	0
33	36	(France) Bernard Jaussaud	(France) Alain Bertrand	(France) Bernard Jaussaud	Renault Clio Williams	6:34:21.7	+1:17:31.1	0
34	55	(Netherlands) Roel Fassbender	(Netherlands) Bart Hissink	(Netherlands) Roel Fassbender	Fiat Seicento	6:35:08.6	+1:18:18.0	0
35	47	(France) Jerome Vergerpion	(France) Frederic Mlynarczyk	(France) Jerome Vergerpion	Citroen Saxo VTS	6:35:10.8	+1:18:20.2	0
36	71	(Belgium) Bob Colsoul	(Belgium) Tom Colsoul	(Belgium) Bob Colsoul	Mitsubishi Lancer Evo V	6:38:19.7	+1:21:29.1	0
37	49	(Italy) Massimo Caccato	(Italy) Andrea Signorotto	(Italy) Massimo Caccato	Fiat Seicento	6:38:22.9	+1:21:32.3	0
38	77	(France) Jean-Pierre Roche	(France) Christophe Preve	(France) Jean-Pierre Roche	Renault Clio 16S	6:43:46.9	+1:26:56.3	0
39	37	(Germany) Peter Bosse	(Germany) Andreas von Skopnik	(Germany) Peter Bosse	Opel Astra GSi 16V	6:48:07.5	+1:31:16.9	0
40	85	(France) Jacques Molbert	(France) Christophe Sonnois	(France) Jacques Molbert	Peugeot 205 GTI 1.9	6:53:46.9	+1:36:56.3	0
41	83	(France) Gerard Mosson	(France) Jean-Luc Pomi	(France) Gerard Mosson	Renault Clio Williams	6:54:11.9	+1:37:21.3	0
42	89	(France) Pascal Allemand	(France) Eric Barthelemy	(France) Pascal Allemand	Citroen AX GTI	6:58:31.4	+1:41:40.8	0
43	57	(Italy) Giusy Tocco	(Italy) Ingrid Salton	(Italy) Giusy Tocco	Fiat Seicento	7:01:56.7	+1:45:06.1	0
44	41	(France) Mickael De Castelli	(France) Michel Robinet	(France) Mickael De Castelli	Peugeot 205 GTI 1.9	7:04:53.6	+1:48:03.0	0
45	88	(Italy) Gabriele Cadringher	(Italy) Gianfranco Serembre	(Italy) Gabriele Cadringher	Subaru Vivio RX-R	7:41:04.5	+2:24:13.9	0
46	50	(France) Patrick Robert	(France) Marie-Francoise Pastor	(France) Patrick Robert	Peugeot 106 XSi	7:41:13.7	+2:24:23.1	0
Retired SS14	7	(United Kingdom) Colin McRae	(United Kingdom) Nicky Grist	(United Kingdom) Ford Motor Co Ltd	Ford Focus WRC 99	Excluded - Water Pump		0
Retired SS14	8	(France) Simon Jean-Joseph	(United Kingdom) Fred Gallagher	(United Kingdom) Ford Motor Co Ltd	Ford Focus WRC 99	Excluded - Water Pump		0
Retired SS13	60	(France) Eric Ballaire	(France) Bruno Beillevaire	(France) Eric Ballaire	Fiat Cinquecento Sporting	Retired		0
Retired SS13	70	(Monaco) Richard Hein	(France) Philippe Serval	(Monaco) Richard Hein	Mitsubishi Carisma GT Evo V	Engine		0
Retired SS13	81	(France) Miguel Baudoin	(France) Eric Mattei	(France) Miguel Baudoin	Renault Clio Williams	Retired		0
Retired SS11	17	(France) Gilles Panizzi	(France) Herve Panizzi	(France) Gilles Panizzi	Subaru Impreza S5 WRC 98	Accident		0
Retired SS11	62	(France) Yves Loubet	(France) Bruno Brissart	(France) Yves Loubet	Mitsubishi Carisma GT Evo V	Engine		0
Retired SS10	61	(Italy) Maurizio Verini	(Italy) Roberto Cancelli	(Italy) Maurizio Verini	Mitsubishi Carisma GT Evo V	Retired		0
Retired SS9	30	(Italy) Fabrizio Tabaton	(Italy) Nicola Gullino	(Italy) Fabrizio Tabaton	Toyota Corolla WRC	Retired		0
Retired SS9	33	(France) Frederic Schmit	(France) Gilles Thimonier	(France) Frederic Schmit	Subaru Impreza 555	Accident		0
Retired SS9	44	(France) Alain Pellerey	(France) Jose Boyer	(France) Alain Pellerey	Citroen Saxo	Retired		0
Retired SS8	35	(Germany) Hans-Josef Weber	(Germany) Ludwing Ruhl	(Germany) Hans-Josef Weber	Mazda 323 GT-R	Gearbox		0
Retired SS8	45	(France) Michel Farnaud	(France) Thierry Giraud	(Germany) Hans-Josef Weber	Mazda 323 GT-R	Gearbox		0
Retired SS7	69	(France) Franck Metiffiot	(France) Christian Caffardo	(France) Franck Metiffiot	Subaru Impreza GT	Retired		0
Retired SS6	32	(Monaco) Franck Phillips	(France) Laurent Gallibert	(Monaco) Franck Phillips	Ford Escort WRC	Retired		0
Retired SS5	22	(Italy) Andrea Dallavilla	(Italy) Danilo Fappani	(Italy) Andrea Dallavilla	Subaru Impreza S5 WRC 98	Clutch		0
Retired SS5	23	(France) Philippe Bugalski	(France) Jean-Paul Chiaroni	(France) Automobiles Citroen	Citroen Saxo	Driveshaft		0
Retired SS5	56	(Monaco) Romeo Zunino	(Italy) Mauro Coscia	(Monaco) Romeo Zunino	Peugeot 106 XSi	Retired		0
Retired SS5	74	(France) Jean Forti	(France) Christophe Ponset	(France) Jean Forti	Subaru Impreza WRX	Mechanical		0
Retired SS5	86	(France) Jean Vinatier	(France) Georges Houel	(France) Jean Vinatier	Subaru Vivio RX-R	Mechanical		0
Retired SS4	42	(France) Nicolas Ressegaire	(France) Regis Ressegaire	(France) Nicolas Ressegaire	Peugeot 306	Retired		0
Retired SS2	82	(Monaco) Marc Dessi	(Monaco) Vanessa Dessi	(Monaco) Marc Dessi	Peugeot 205 GTI 1.9	Retired		0
Retired SS1	2	(Belgium) Freddy Loix	(Belgium) Sven Smeets	(Japan) Marlboro Mitsubishi Ralliart	Mitsubishi Lancer Evo VI	Accident		0
Retired SS1	3	(Spain) Carlos Sainz Sr.	(Spain) Luis Moya	(Japan) Toyota Castrol Team	Toyota Corolla WRC	Accident		0
Retired SS1	11	(Germany) Armin Schwarz	(Germany) Manfred Hiemer	(Czech Republic) Skoda Motorsport	Skoda Octavia WRC	Clutch		0
Retired SS1	12	(Czech Republic) Pavel Sibera	(Czech Republic) Petr Gross	(Czech Republic) Skoda Motorsport	Skoda Octavia WRC	Driveshaft		0
Retired SS1	25	(Spain) Jesus Puras	(Spain) Marc Marti	(France) Automobiles Citroen	Citroen Saxo	Accident		0
Retired SS1	26	(Austria) Manfred Stohl	(Austria) Peter Muller	(Austria) Manfred Stohl	Mitsubishi Lancer Evo V	Accident		0
Retired SS1	28	(Spain) Luis Climent Asensio	(Spain) Alex Romani	(Spain) Vallencia Terra y Mar	Mitsubishi Lancer Evo V	Accident		0
Retired SS1	40	(France) Gilles Chevalier	(France) Robert Patti	(France) Gilles Chevalier	Renault Clio Williams	Mechanical		0
Retired SS1	43	(Germany) Frank Post	(Germany) Bertram Schwalie	(Germany) Frank Post	Citroen Saxo	Accident		0
Retired SS1	46	(Germany) Hilde Henry	(Germany) Christina Hanemann	(Germany) Hilde Henry	Citroen Saxo	Mechanical		0
Retired SS1	48	(Poland) Jacek Sikora	(Poland) Marek Kaczmarek	(Poland) Jacek Sikora	Fiat Seicento	Accident		0
Retired SS1	53	(France) Daniel Lessantini	(France) Fabrice Roux	(France) Daniel Lessantini	Peugeot 106 XSi	Accident		0
Retired SS1	59	(Italy) Stefano Macaluso	(Italy) Giovanni Bernacchini	(Italy) Stefano Macaluso	Fiat Cinquecento	Accident		0
Retired SS1	63	(France) Bruno Marcon	(Monaco) Jean-Francois Cavarero	(France) Bruno Marcon	Ford Escort RS Cosworth	Retired		0
Retired SS1	68	(France) Philippe Brun	(France) Pascal Grange	(France) Philippe Brun	Mitsubishi Lancer Evo IV	Excluded		0
Retired SS1	73	(United Kingdom) Nigel Heath	(United Kingdom) Chris Patterson	(United Kingdom) Nigel Heath	Subaru Impreza WRX	Accident		0
Retired SS1	75	(France) Lilian Polge	(France) Alain Bonnet	(France) Lilian Polge	Ford Escort RS Cosworth	Excluded		0
Retired SS1	76	(France) Serge Guiramand	(France) Jacques Clavel	(France) Serge Guiramand	Renault Clio Williams	Accident		0

==== Special Stages ====
All dates and times are CET (UTC+1).

Day	Stage	Time	Name	Length (km)	Winner	Time	Rally leader
1 18 Jan	SS1	8:30	Plan de Vitrolles - Faye	48.28	(Finland) Tommi Makinen	34:36.4	(Finland) Tommi Makinen
1 18 Jan	SS2	10:41	L'Epine - Rosans	31.15	(Belgium) Bruno Thiry	19:59.6	(Finland) Tommi Makinen
1 18 Jan	SS3	13:16	Ruissas - Eygalayes	27.56	(France) Gilles Panizzi	18:50.3	(Finland) Tommi Makinen
1 18 Jan	SS4	16:18	Prunieres - Embrun	33.82	(United Kingdom) Colin McRae	20:50.3	(France) Gilles Panizzi
1 18 Jan	SS5	17:20	St. Clement - St. Saveur	20.35	(United Kingdom) Colin McRae	13:58.0	(France) Gilles Panizzi
2 19 Jan	SS6	8:21	BIF. C1/D1 - Bayons	32.52	(France) Gilles Panizzi	24:13.1	(France) Gilles Panizzi
2 19 Jan	SS7	11:05	Sisteron - Thoard	36.72	(Finland) Tommi Makinen	25:43.4	(France) Gilles Panizzi
2 19 Jan	SS8	14:26	Entrevaux - St. Pierre	30.73	(Finland) Juha Kankkunen	23:58.4	(Finland) Tommi Makinen
2 19 Jan	SS9	17:46	Sospel - La Bollene 1	33.65	(Finland) Tommi Makinen	27:20.1	(Finland) Tommi Makinen
2 19 Jan	SS10	18:37	Lantosque - Luceram 1	20.87	(United Kingdom) Colin McRae	15:22.7	(Finland) Tommi Makinen
3 20 Jan	SS11	08:20	Sospel - La Bollene 2	33.65	(France) Didier Auriol	28:06.2	(Finland) Tommi Makinen
3 20 Jan	SS12	9:11	Lantosque - Luceram 2	20.87	(United Kingdom) Colin McRae	15:43.2	(Finland) Tommi Makinen
3 20 Jan	SS13	11:23	Sospel - La Bollene 3	33.65	(Finland) Harri Rovanpera	26:53.4	(Finland) Tommi Makinen
3 20 Jan	SS14	12:14	Lantosque - Luceram 3	20.87	(France) Didier Auriol	15:19.0	(Finland) Tommi Makinen

==== Championship Standings ====
Pos.	Drivers' Championship			Manufacturers' Championship		
Pos.	Move	Driver	Points	Move	Manufacturer	Points
1		(Finland) Tommi Makinen	10		(Japan) Marlboro Mitsubishi Ralliart	10
2		(Finland) Juha Kankkunen	6		(Japan) Subaru World Rally Team	7
3		(France) Didier Auriol	4		(Spain) SEAT Sport	5
4		(France) Francois Delecour	3		(Japan) Toyota Castrol Team	4
5		(Belgium) Bruno Thiry	2			
