= FSM Beskid =

Polish car prototype

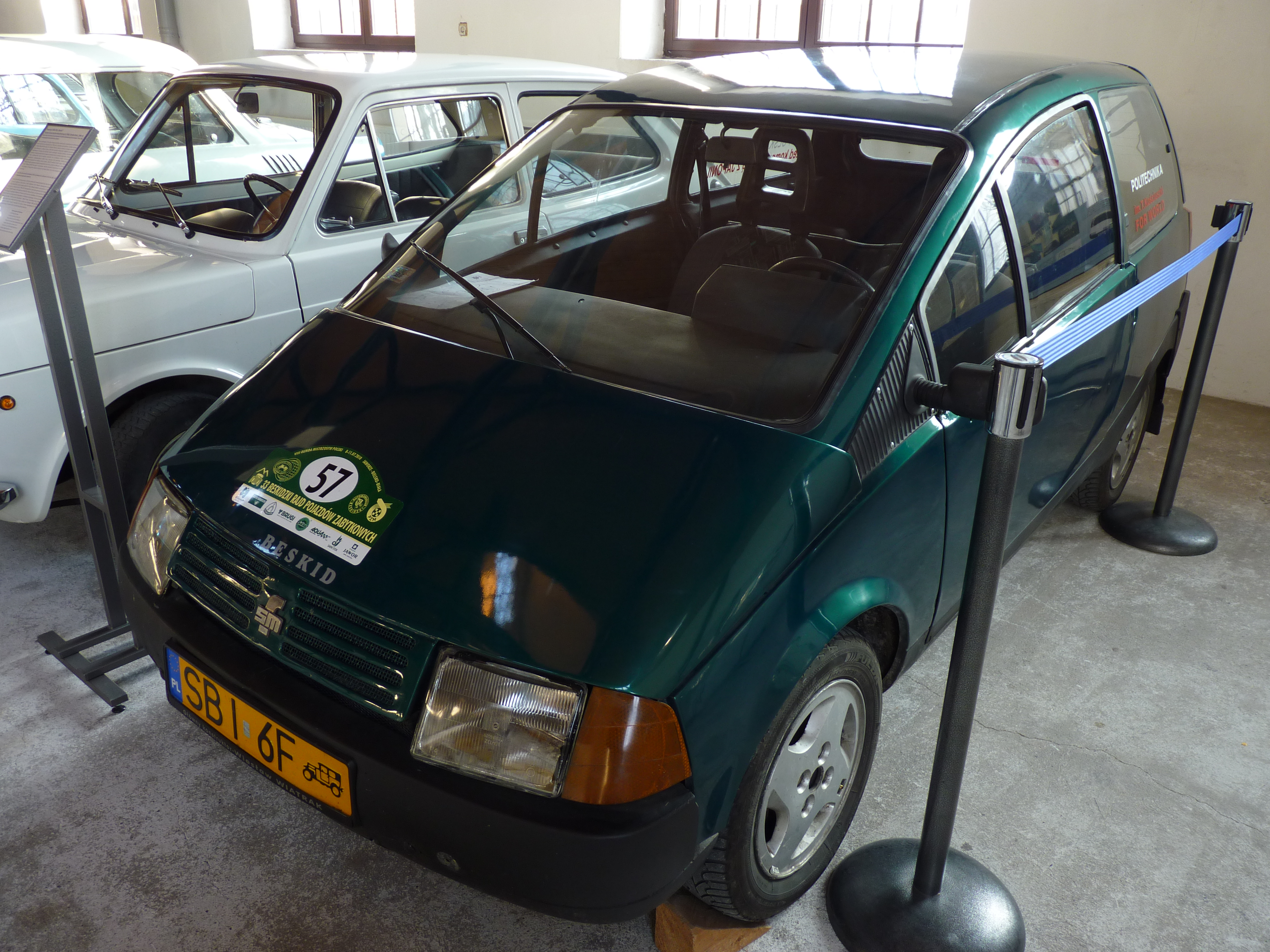
FSM Beskid 106 at Muzeum Inżynierii Miejskiej in Kraków.

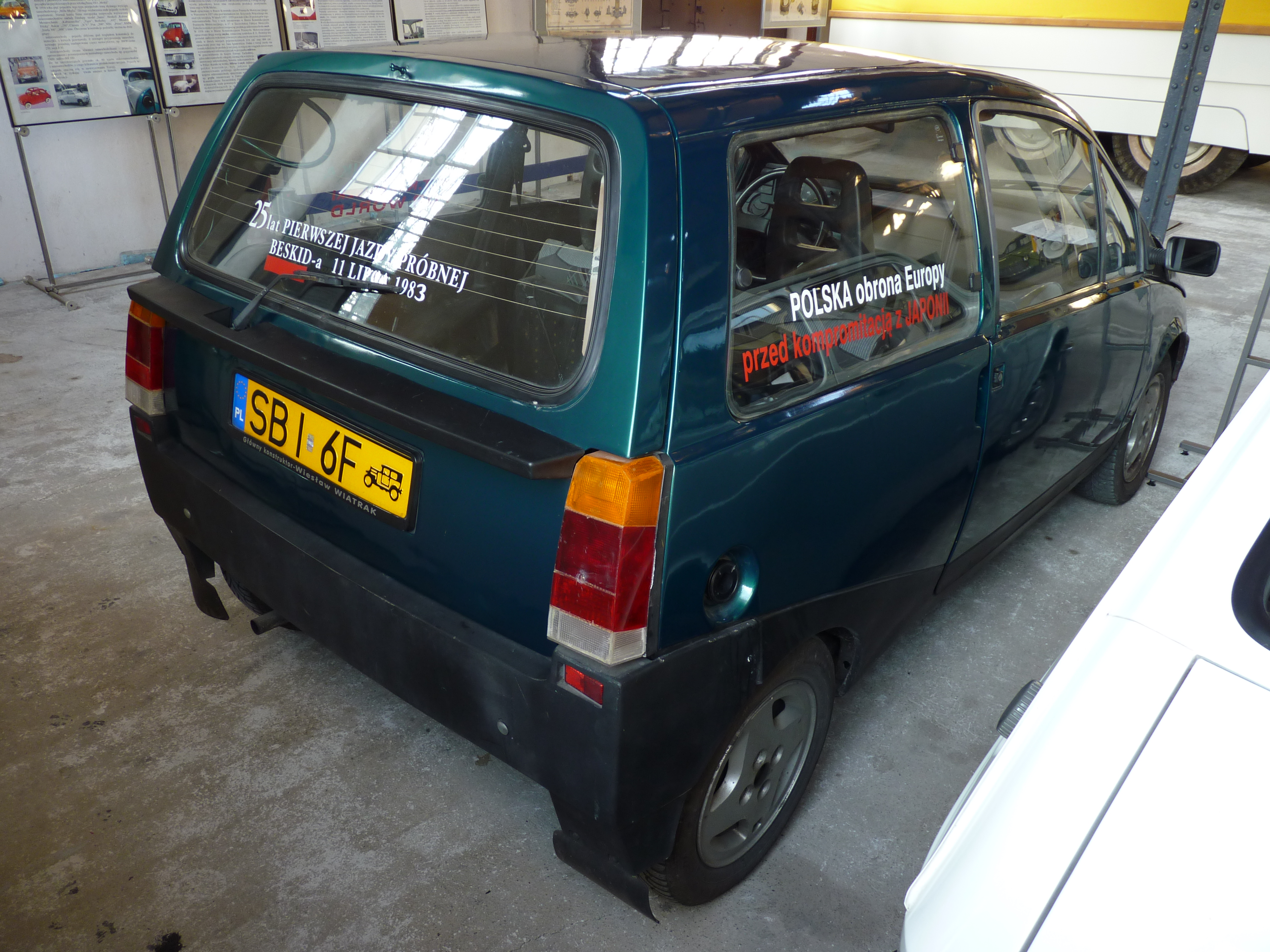
FSM Beskid 106 at Muzeum Inżynierii Miejskiej in Kraków.

Beskid was a series of economy hatchback car prototypes in Poland designed by BOSMAL Automotive Research and Development Institute during 1982-1986. The design team was led by Wiesław Wiatrak who later used the Beskid as his daily car and finally passed it to a museum in Kraków.

The car never went into mass production; However, it is also suggested that the Beskid was in fact a back-up measure if licensing talks were unsuccessful; finally the Fiat Cinquecento was produced in FSM. While all seven Beskid prototypes were slated for destruction, six were saved. One was used for a crash test, and the remaining six are located in various institutions in Poland:

- Museum of Technology, Warsaw - Yellow
- Museum of Municipal Engineering, Kraków in Kraków - Two, white and green
- Opole University of Technology - White
- Museum of Technology and Transport in Szczecin - Green
- BOSMAL museum at BOSMAL facility in Bielsko Biała - Cream

The body style was patented, but BOSMAL lacked funds for the extension of the patent.

The name comes from the Beskids mountains.
