= Museum of Municipal Engineering, Kraków =

Coordinates: 50.049477°N 19.946964°E

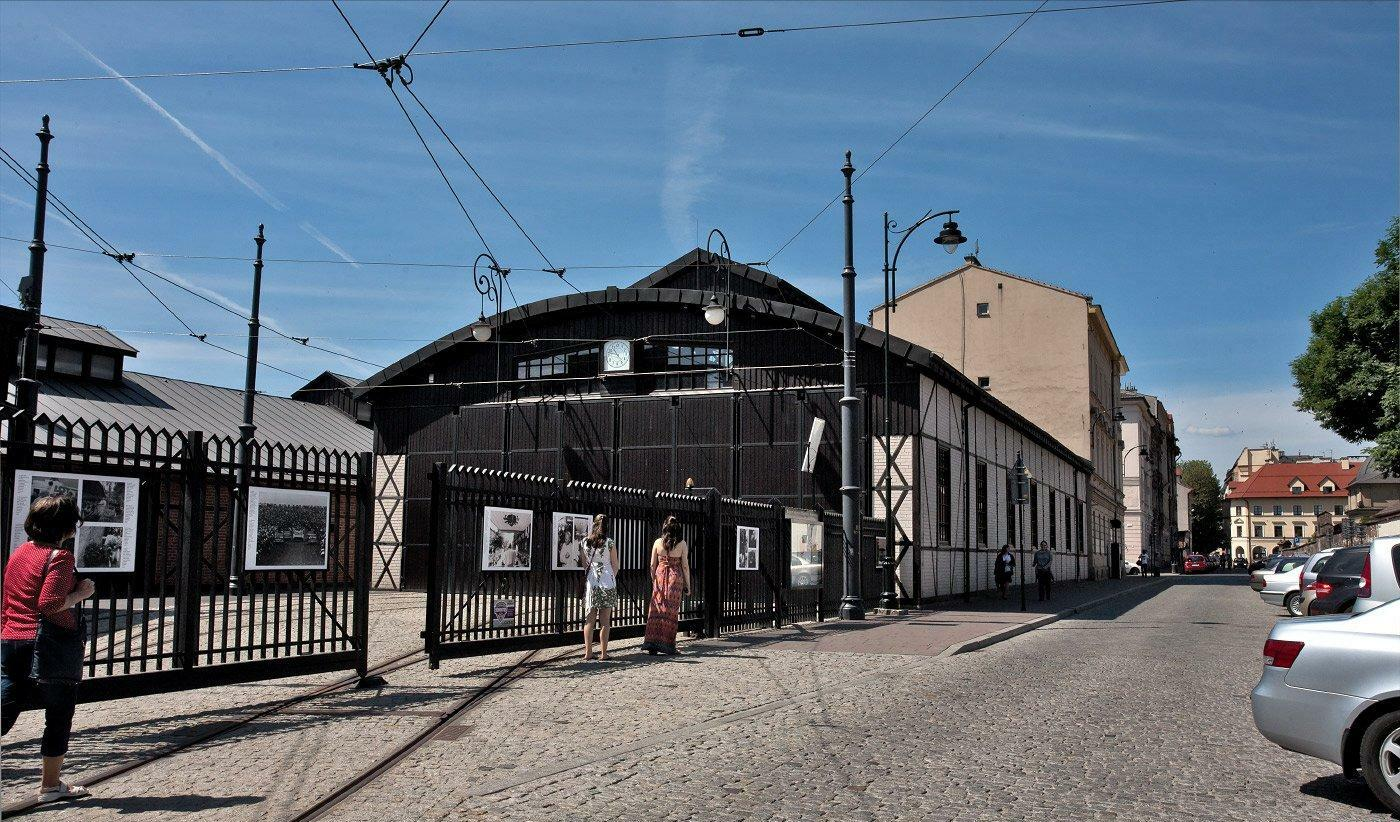

The Museum of Engineering and Technology in Kraków (Polish: Muzeum Inżynierii i Techniki w Krakowie) is a municipal museum in Kraków, Poland; located at ul. św. Wawrzyńca 15 street in the centre of historical Kazimierz district. It was established in 1998 (28 years ago) by the city, for the purpose of documenting and popularizing the history of the city engineering, transport as well as technological progress. It consists of several buildings housing early trams, buses and motorcycles, radios, industrial machinery and early means of production, as well as many educational aids and displays. The museum is very popular with school children, but also with adults.
