= Fiat Cinquecento =

City car

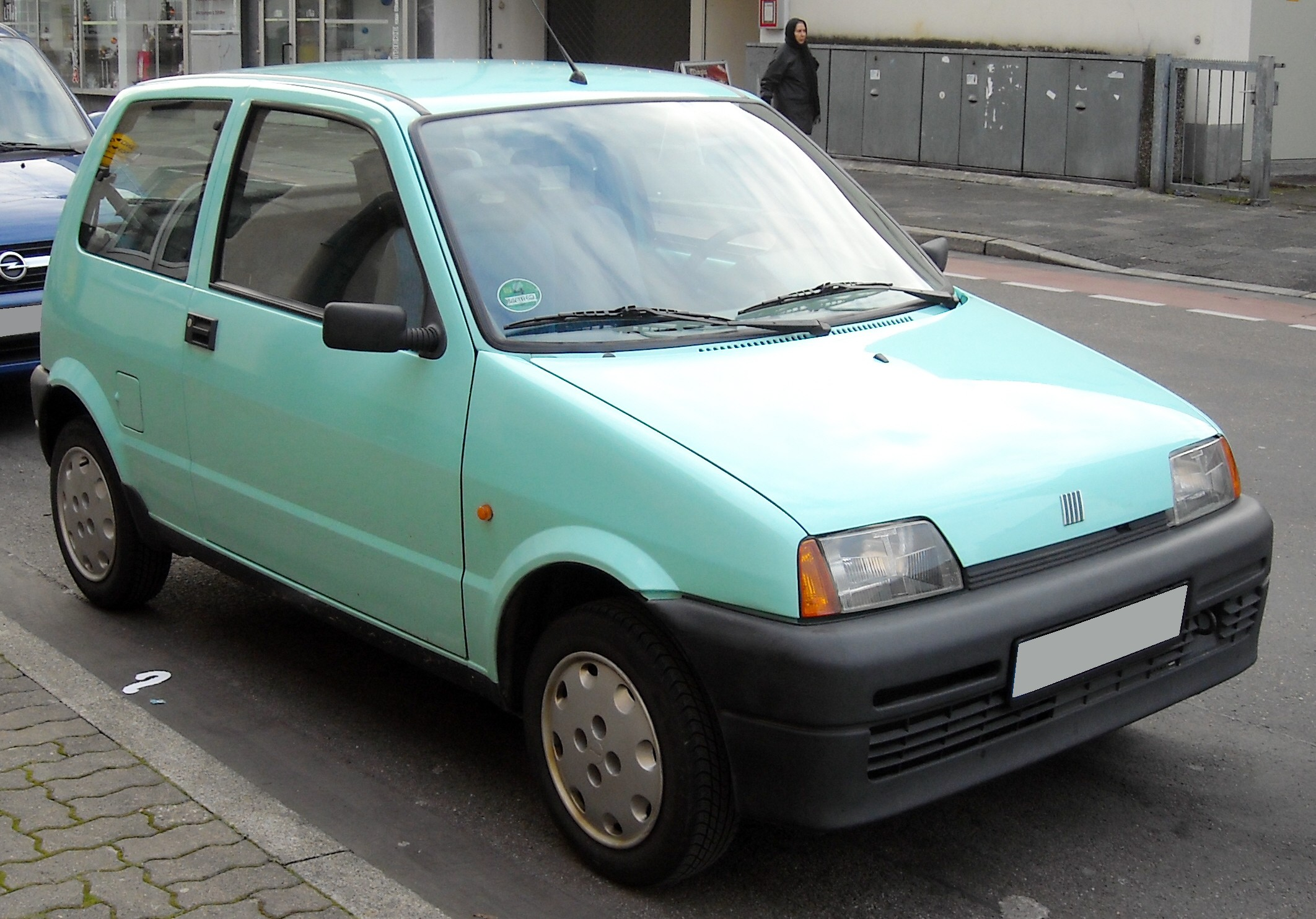

Overview
- Manufacturer: FSM (1991–1992); Fiat Auto Poland (1992–1998)
- Also called: FSM Cinquecento (1991–1992)
- Production: December 1991–1998 (1,164,525 units)
- Assembly: Poland: Tychy
- Designer: Ermanno Cressoni at Centro Stile Fiat

Body and chassis
- Class: City car (A)
- Body style: 3-door hatchback
- Layout: Front-engine, front-wheel-drive

Powertrain
- Engine: 704 cc I2 (petrol); 899 cc Tipo 100 I4 (petrol); 903 cc Tipo 100 I4 (petrol); 1108 cc FIRE I4 (petrol)

Dimensions
- Wheelbase: 2,200 mm (86.6 in)
- Length: 3,230 mm (127.2 in); 3,226 mm (127.0 in) (Sporting)
- Width: 1,490 mm (58.7 in); 1,486 mm (58.5 in) (Sporting)
- Height: 1,435 mm (56.5 in)
- Kerb weight: 675–727 kg (1,488–1,603 lb)

Chronology
- Predecessor: Fiat 126
- Successor: Fiat Seicento

The Fiat Cinquecento (Type 170) (/ˌtʃɪŋkwɪˈtʃɛntoʊ/, Italian: [ˌtʃiŋkweˈtʃɛnto]) is a city car manufactured and marketed by Fiat from 1991 to 1998 over a single generation. It is a three-door hatchback that seats four passengers and has a front-engine, front-wheel-drive layout. It was manufactured at Fiat Auto Poland, which had manufactured its predecessor the Fiat 126.

Production of the Cinquecento ended in 1998 with the introduction of the Fiat Seicento.

== Design ==
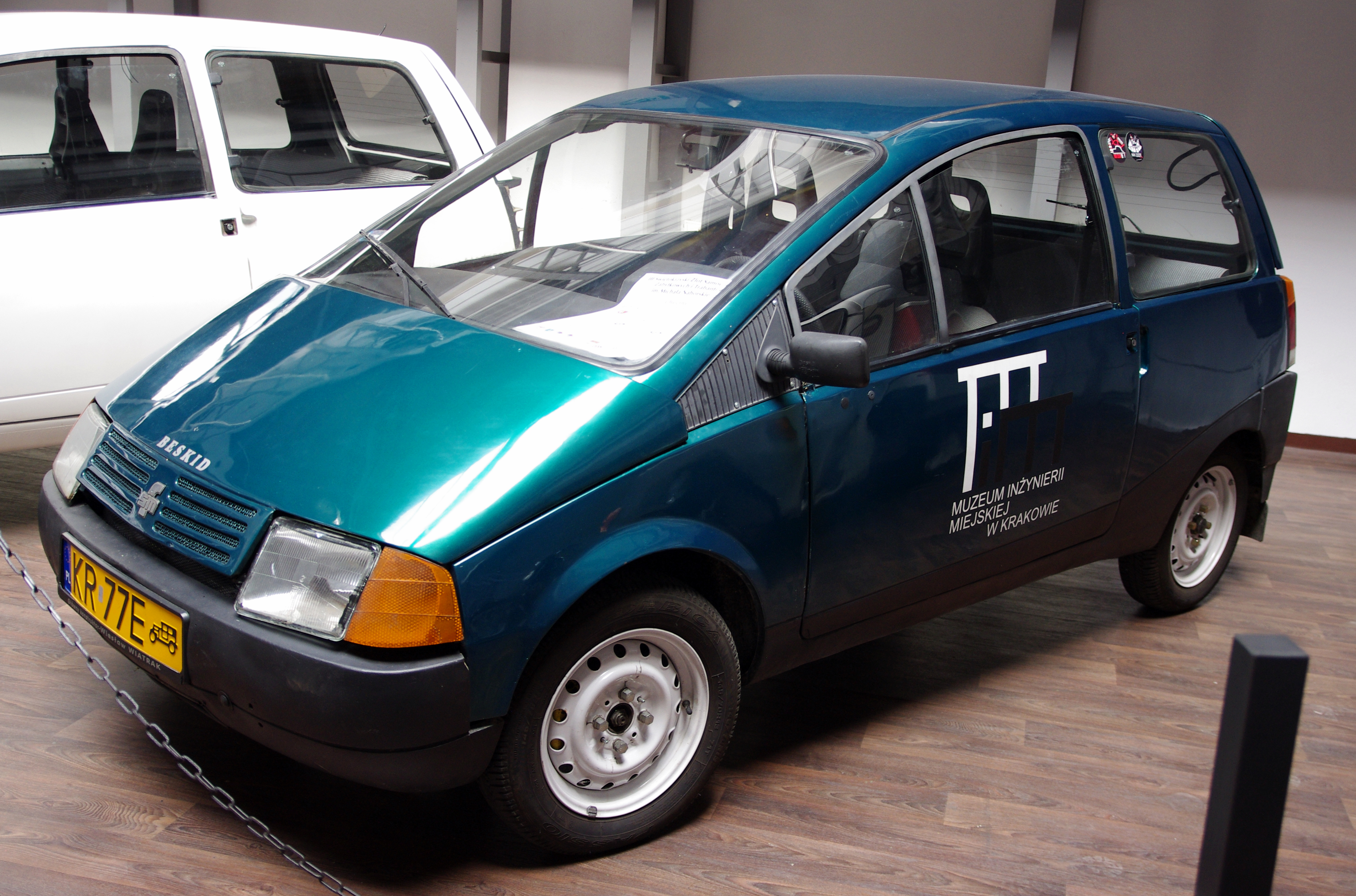
Beskid 106 prototype developed in the 1980s by FSM

The origins of the Cinquecento trace to the early 1980s, with focused research projects of the Consiglio Nazionale delle Ricerche in Rome, studying a super-economical vehicle – from which a series of prototypes evolved, with abbreviations X1/72 to X1/79.

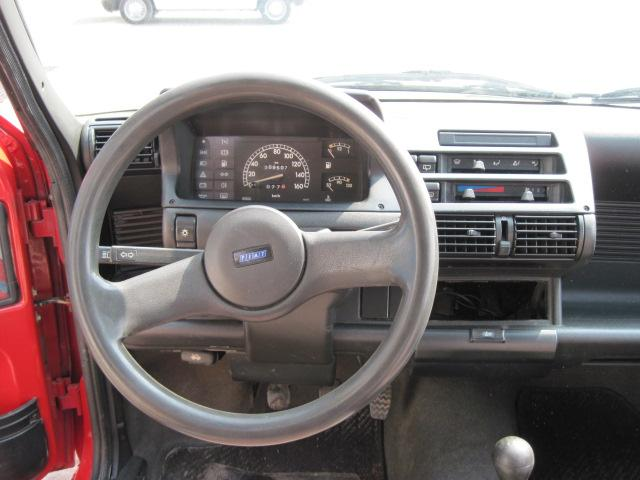
Fiat Cinquecento dashboard

In parallel, FSM, not yet under FIAT's ownership, was studying the BOSMAL, a small car project that would culminate in the concept Beskid 106. Acquisition of FSM by the Italian automotive group led to the abandonment of this prototype in favor of a car that incorporated some of the concepts of the X1/7 series of previous years (until 1993 the cars produced in Poland were marketed as FSM rather than FIAT models). Notably, Patrick Le Quément, Renault's chief designer, sought similar inspiration from the BOSMAL study, resulting in the first generation Renault Twingo.

Launched in December 1991 to replace the Fiat 126, the Cinquecento was designed by Ermanno Cressoni in collaboration with Antonio Piovano; the interior was designed by Claudio Mottino and Giuseppe Bertolusso.

The Cinquecento featured independent suspension front and in the rear, front disc brakes, side impact beams, crumple zone and galvanized body panels.

Steering was unassisted rack and pinion.

Options included central locking, power windows, sunroof, full-length retractable canvas roof, split rear seat, headlight range adjustment, and air conditioning.

The right hand drive version for the British market was launched in June 1993, as one of the few city cars marketed in the UK.

== Engines ==
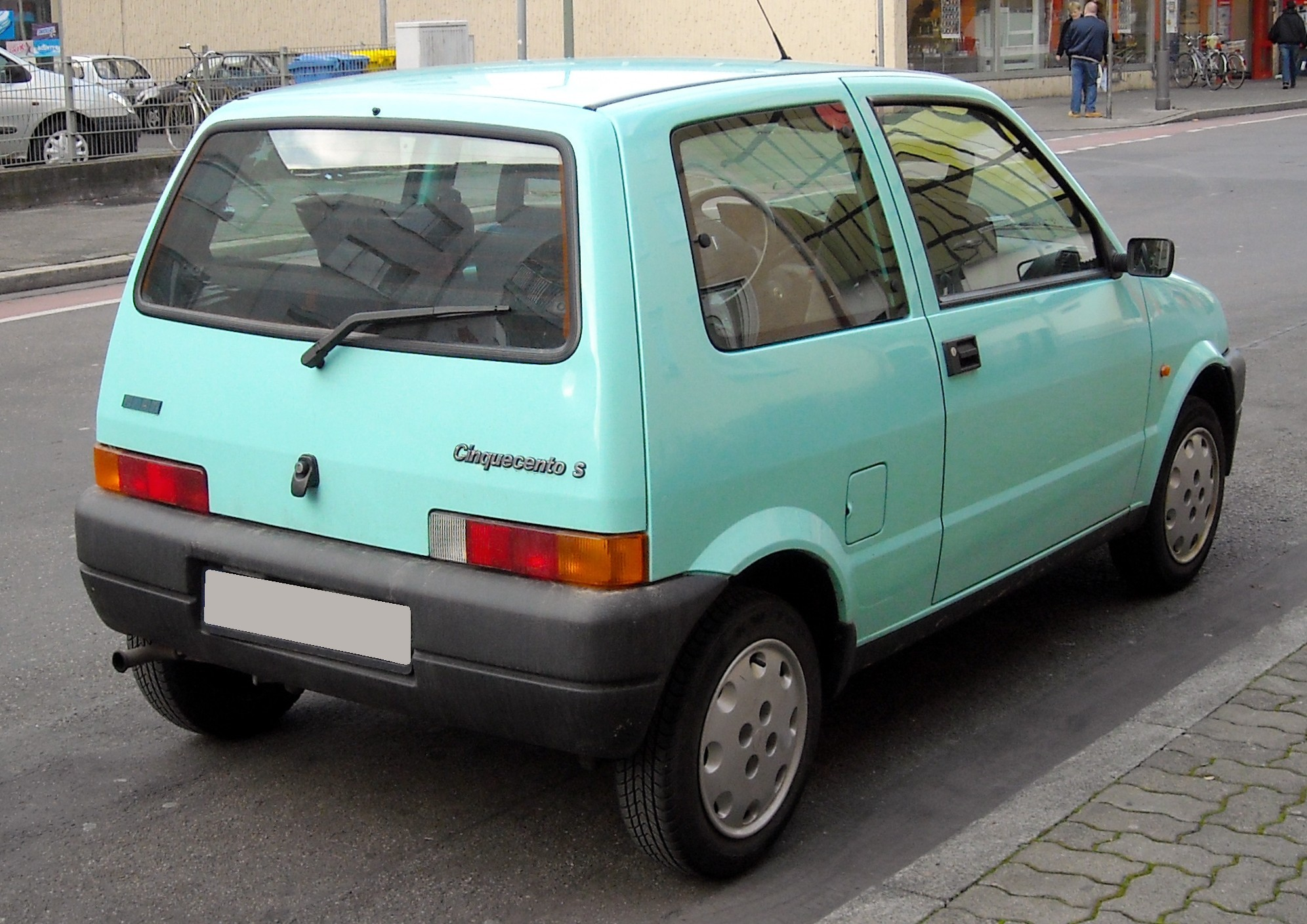
Rear view

The Cinquecento was initially available with two engine choices, with the 1.1 L FIRE or "sporting" joining the lineup later. Although the 704 cc engine was mounted longitudinally, the bigger units were fitted transversely, making the little Fiat one of the few cars in the world available with both configurations at the same time.

=== 704 cc ===
The smallest engine, intended for sale in Poland only, was a 704 cc OHV two-cylinder unit delivering 31 PS (23 kW), 30 PS (22 kW) when fitted with a catalytic converter. Cinquecento inherited this unit from the 126p BIS, an evolution of the 126p which was cancelled when the Cinquecento production started.

In order to be fitted in the front-wheel drive Cinquecento, it underwent a major redesign (although the engine still employed a carburettor), which resulted, among other changes, in the crankshaft revolving in the opposite direction than in the 126p BIS.

=== 903/899 cc ===
The bigger engine was the 903 cc 40 PS (29 kW; 39 hp) version of the veteran Fiat 100 OHV four cylinder engine, which saw service in many small Fiat models, starting with Fiat 850. (This engine dates back to the initial 633 cc unit as introduced in the 1955 FIAT 600.)

It was fitted with single point fuel injection and was the base engine in most markets. Due to fiscal limitations, the displacement of this unit was limited to 899 cc in 1993, with a slight reduction of output, now producing 39 PS (29 kW; 38 hp). This engine is derived from that used in the Fiat 127.

While it still retains OHV chain drive pushrod layout it now has hydraulic tappets. Also now uses twin coil distributorless ignition.

=== 1.1 FIRE (Sporting) ===
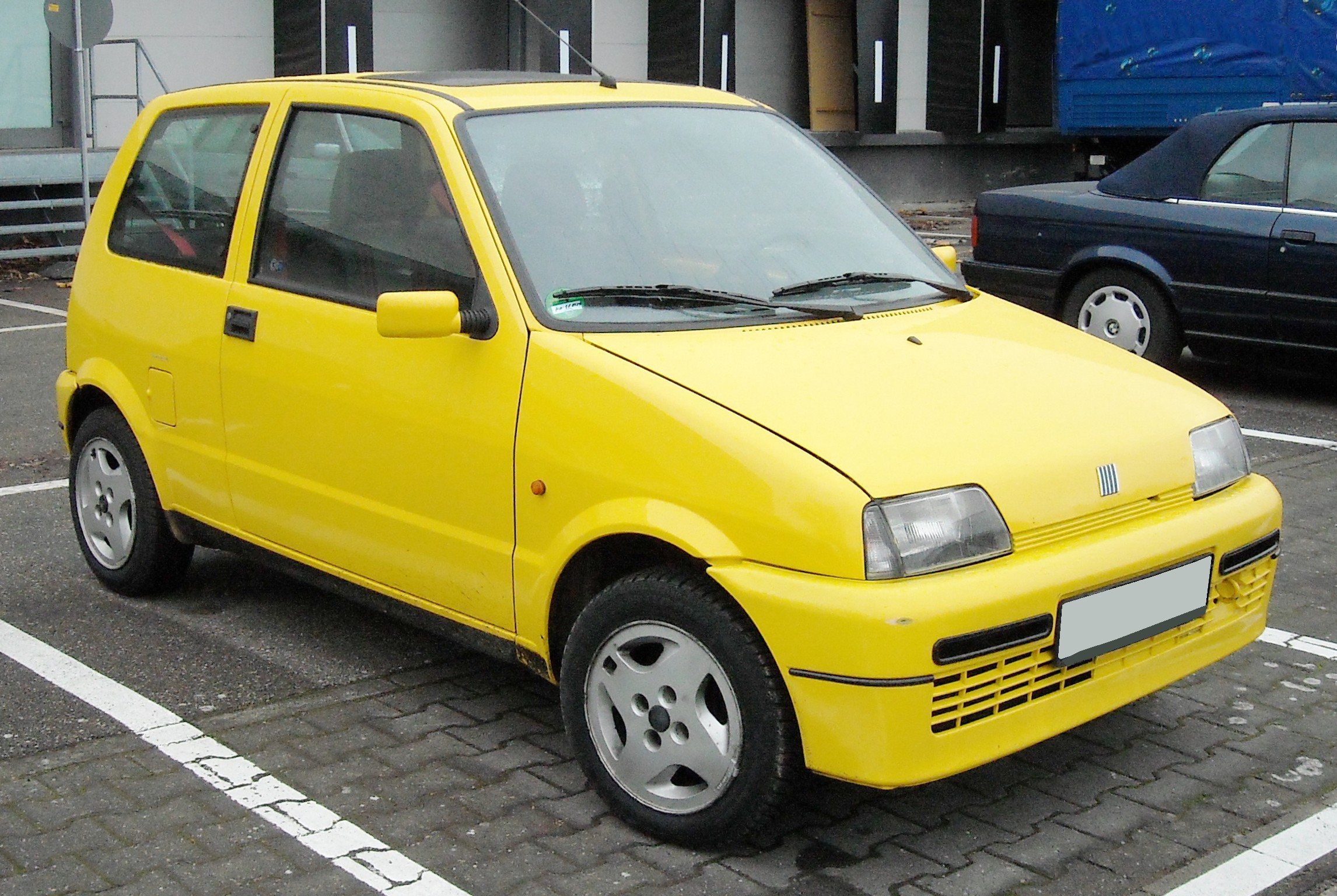
Cinquecento Sporting

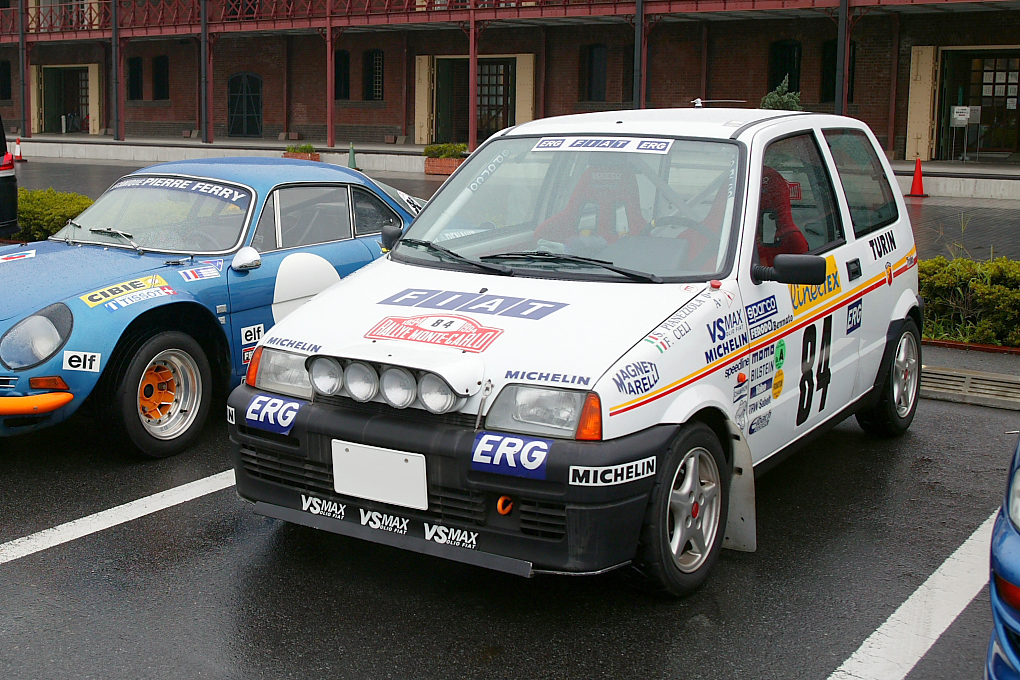
Cinquecento Trofeo

In 1994, Fiat introduced the Cinquecento Sporting, featuring the 1108 cc SOHC FIRE 54 PS (40 kW; 53 hp) engine from the entry level Punto of the same era, mated to a close ratio gearbox. Other additions were a drop in standard ride height, front anti roll bar, 13" alloy wheels, plus colour coded bumpers and mirrors. The interior saw a tachometer added, along with sports seats, red seatbelts and a leather steering wheel and gear knob.

It is the Sporting model which gave birth to a rallying trophy and a Group A Kit-Car version.

=== Elettra ===
From 1992 to 1996, Fiat also produced and sold an electric variant of the Cinquecento called the Elettra. The car was offered with either a lead acid or NiCd battery pack, providing a ranges of 62 mi (100 km) and 93 mi (150 km) respectively. Unlike purpose built electric cars, the Cinquecento Elettra used two battery packs, one in the engine bay and one under the rear seats, replacing the fuel tank.

Although selling for 140,000 francs (~US$23,000), the Cinquecento Elettra enjoyed relative popularity in Italy, France and Switzerland.

== Abarth ==
Fiat offered optional extras from the factory labelled with the Abarth name. The Abarth extras for the Cinquecento consisted of cosmetic changes only. A front apron with fitted fog lights, a rear apron, side skirts and a rear spoiler with a fitted 3rd brake light. There were also a set of 13" Speedline five spoke alloys wheels available, instead of the standard Sporting alloys.

Unlike true Abarth models, there were no engine upgrades available from the factory and the car could not be purchased as a whole separate model. The Abarth parts were to be added by the purchaser at the time of ordering, hence it is common to see cars with only some of the Abarth extras.

== Concepts ==
During the 1990s, a number of concept cars based on the Fiat Cinquecento were developed, by a number of design houses, including one that featured half of the car's interior and a running board to place bikes.

Another of these designs was the 1992 Italdesign Cinquecento and subsequent 1993 Lucciola, a proposal for a new Cinquecento by Fabrizio Giugiaro of Italdesign. However, instead of the car becoming the next small Fiat city car, a version of the design ended up being put into production by the South Korean Daewoo Motor, as their Matiz in 1998. Instead, Fiat decided to update the Cinquecento's styling in early 1998 and relaunch it as the Seicento, which continued until 2010 and enabled the Cinquecento's basic design and most of its mechanicals to survive for nearly 20 years.

== Production figures ==
Year	Production (units)
1991	6,020
1992	83,299
1993	192,294
1994	188,973
1995	204,508
1996	205,296
1997	203,589
1998	80,546
