= Fiat Seicento =

City car

Fiat Seicento (1997–2005) Fiat 600 (2005–2010)
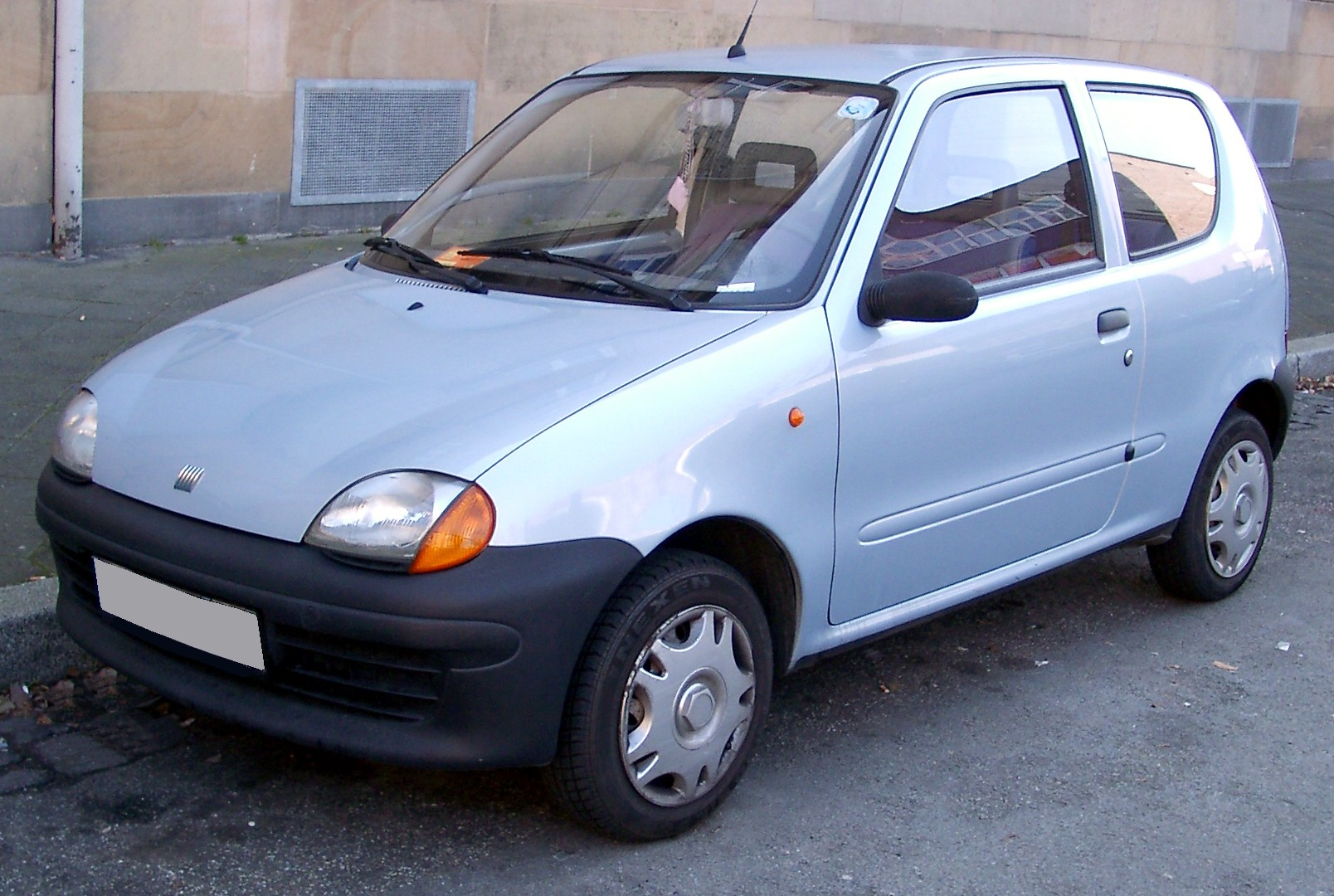

Overview
- Manufacturer: Fiat Auto Poland (1997–2007); Fiat Group Automobiles (2007–2010)
- Also called: Fiat 600 (Europe; 2005–2010)
- Production: 1997–2010 (1,328,973 units)
- Assembly: Tychy, Poland

Body and chassis
- Class: City car (A)
- Body style: 3-door hatchback
- Layout: Front-engine, front-wheel-drive, Rear-motor, rear-wheel-drive (electric)
- Related: Fiat Cinquecento

Powertrain
- Engine: petrol: 899 cc 170.A1 I4; 1108 cc FIRE I4; electric
- Transmission: 5-speed manual 5-speed automated manual

Dimensions
- Wheelbase: 2,200 mm (86.6 in)
- Length: 3,337 mm (131.4 in)
- Width: 1,508 mm (59.4 in)
- Height: 1,420 mm (55.9 in)
- Curb weight: 710–750 kg (1,565–1,653 lb)

Chronology
- Predecessor: Fiat Cinquecento
- Successor: Fiat Nuova 500; Fiat Panda (169)

The Fiat Seicento (Type 187) is a city car produced by the Italian company Fiat, introduced at the end of 1997 as a replacement for the Fiat Cinquecento, although it was also based on the Cinquecento. The Seicento did not differ much from its predecessor, retaining the same engines, chassis and general dimensions, although it did gain a minor 90 mm in length (total length of 3,340 mm).

Like its predecessors, the Cinquecento and Polski Fiat 126, the Seicento was built in Fiat's factory in Tychy, Poland.

By April 2004, 1.1 million units of the Seicento had been produced. The Seicento name comes from the Italian word for 600; the Seicento is the spiritual successor to the Fiat 600. The car was rebadged as the 600 to celebrate the 50th anniversary of the original model.

== Euro NCAP performance ==
In Euro NCAP crash tests, the Fiat Seicento was only awarded a 1.5 star rating, and fractionally beat the worst contenders in the history of Euro NCAP, namely the Rover 100 (a restyled Rover Metro, in turn directly based on the Austin Metro) and the original Chrysler Voyager MPV. By comparison, another small car, the Smart Fortwo, earned three stars in the crash test.

== Versions ==
=== Trims/Equipment ===
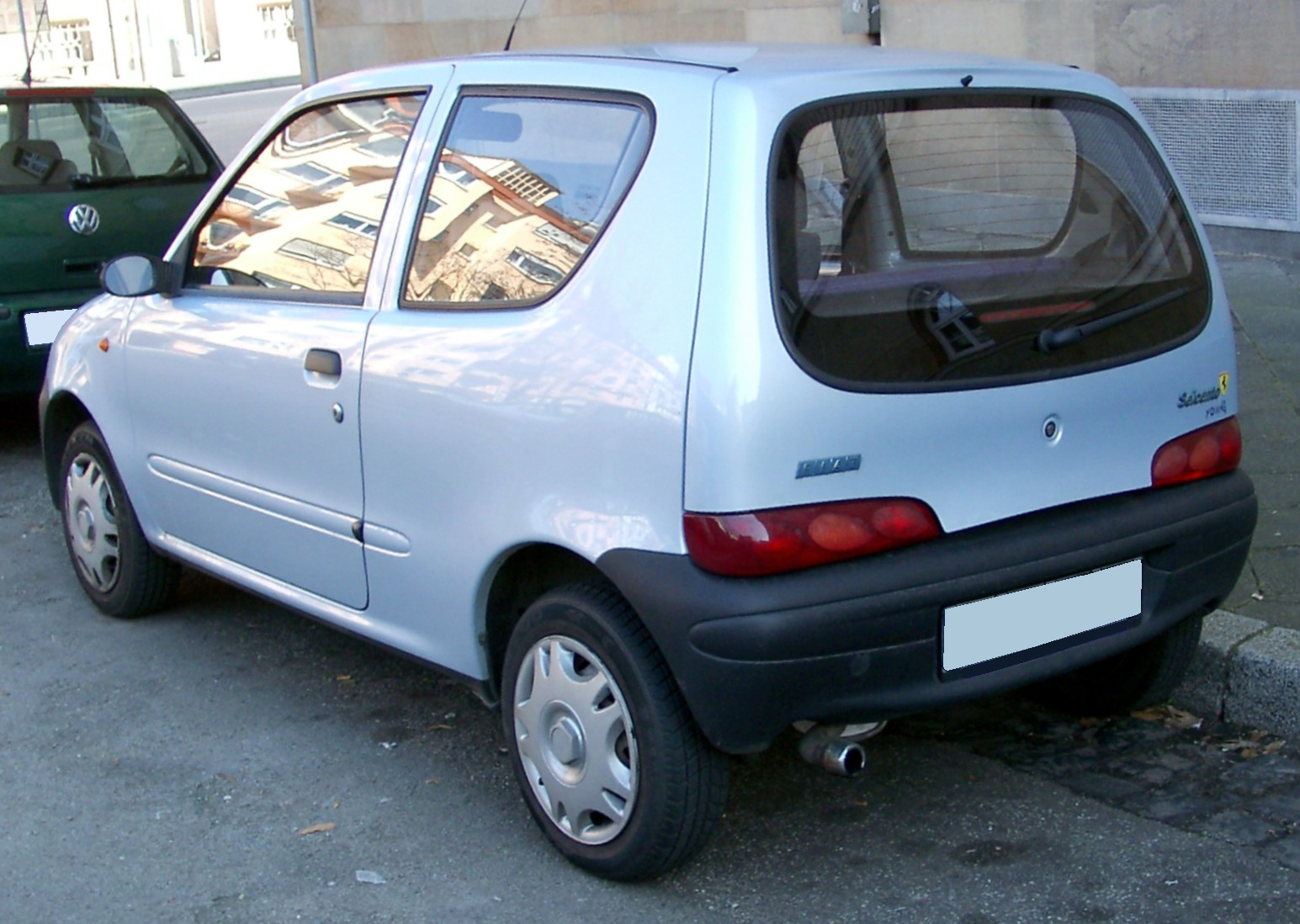
Fiat Seicento (pre-facelift)

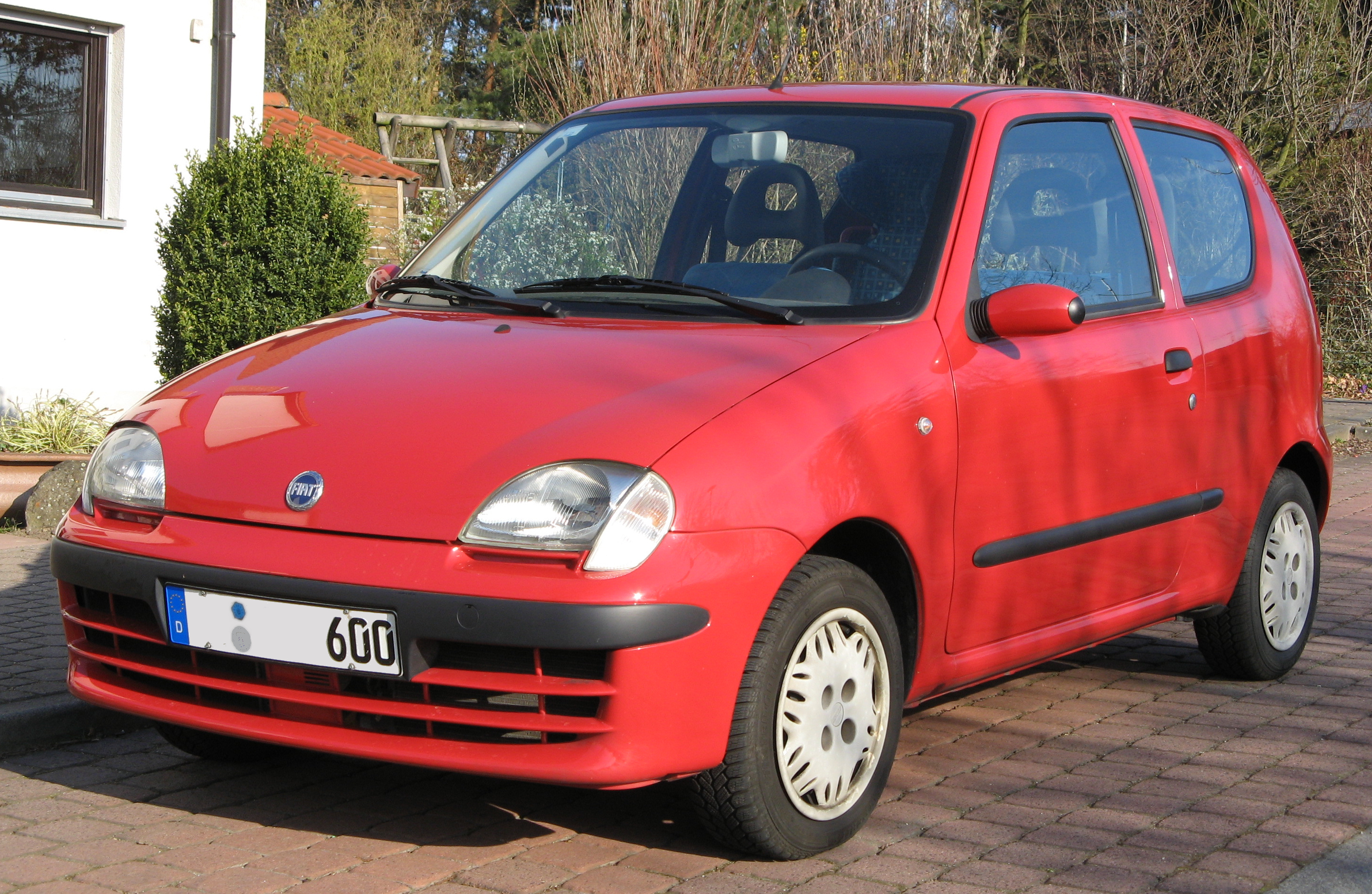
Fiat Seicento (facelift)

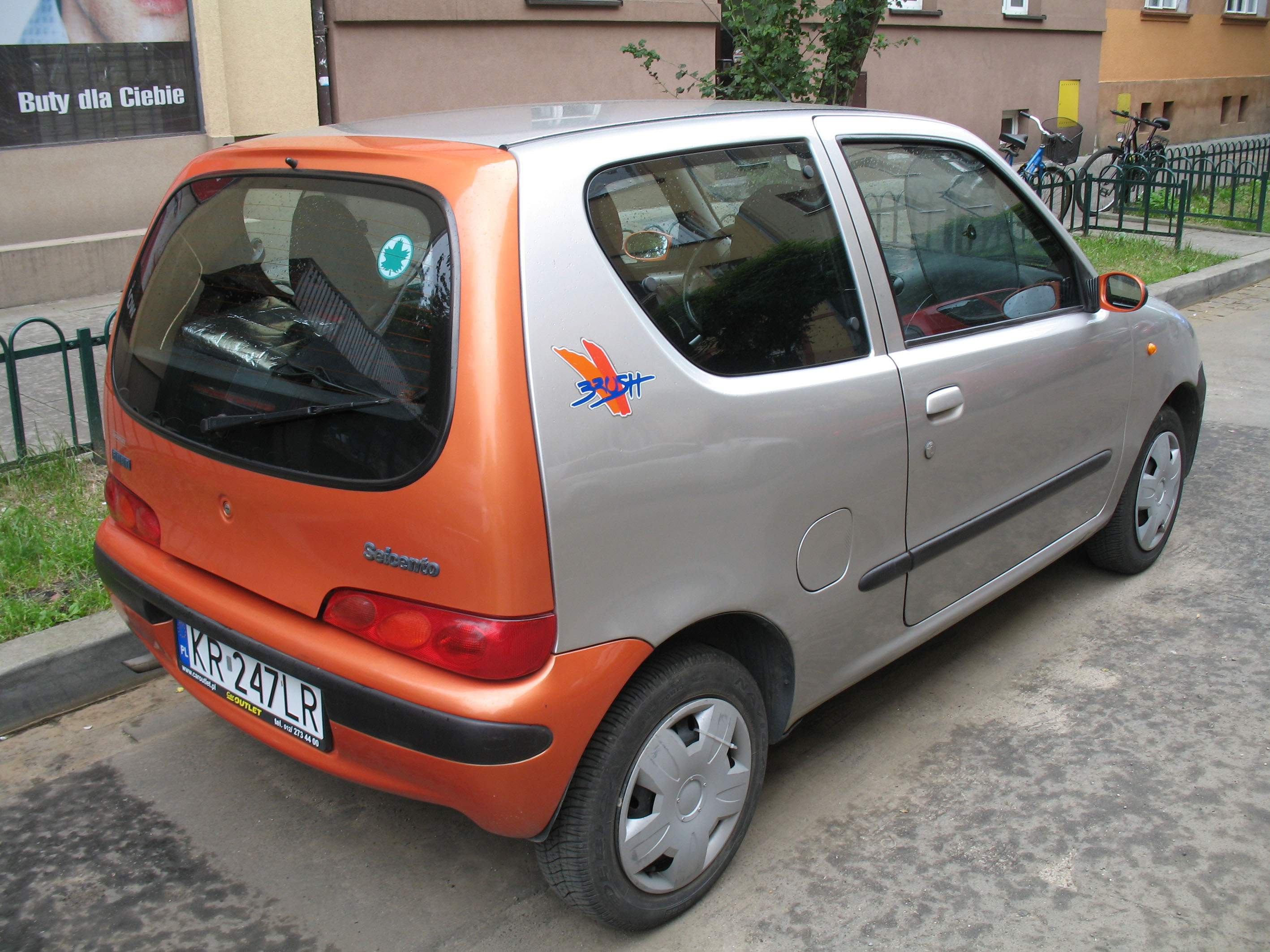
Fiat Seicento Brush (facelift)

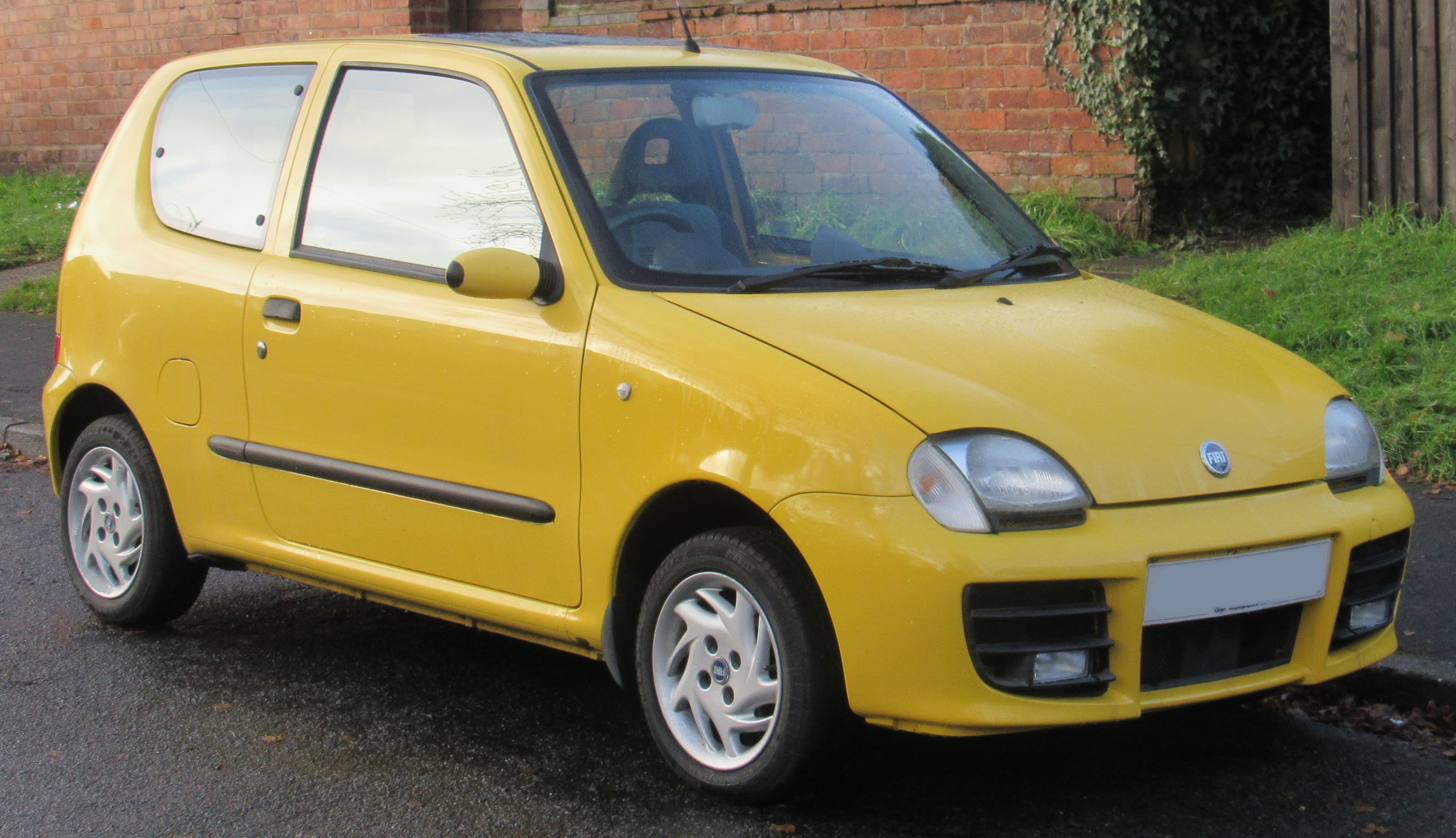
Fiat Seicento Sporting (facelift)

At launch, the Seicento was available with three trim levels; a basic 'S' with black bumpers and spartan equipment and initially the 899 cc 29 kW (40 PS; 39 hp) 100 series engine; the 'SX', which was a slight upgrade over the 'S' and included colour coded bumpers, electric windows, central locking and a sunroof. The 'SX' was also available as a 'Citymatic' which features clutchless manual gearchange, and a 'Sporting' with the larger FIRE series 1,108 cc 40 kW (54 PS; 54 hp) engine, 20 mm (0.8 in) lower suspension and anti-roll bars added.

Cosmetically, this version gained 13" alloy wheels and sports seats. An Abarth styling kit was also available consisting of a body kit with optional Abarth 14" wheels. A close ratio gearbox, sill kick plates, embroidered headrests, leather gear lever and steering wheel, colour highlighted trim in the bumpers, side skirts and a spoiler also available.

Both the 'Sporting' and the Abarths were available with ABS, air conditioning and power steering, but due to cost, not very many owners took up the options.

In 1999, the FIRE engine was used in the special 'Suite' version, which came with air conditioning. A special edition called the 'Soleil' was available in some markets, which was based on the 'SX' model, but came with a full-length electrically folding fabric roof.

In October 2000, after the update, all cars were given clear indicator lenses, with the Sporting model getting a restyled bodykit. Power steering was still optional on lower end Seicentos.

A 'Michael Schumacher' edition of the Sporting, with ABS and the Abarth styling kit, was also launched at this time to celebrate the Ferrari driver's Formula One success. This model was almost identical to the 'Sporting' with the Abarth kit with the exception of a chrome gear lever surrounds and Michael's signature on the boot lid and side skirt. A limited edition plate and number was located on the passenger door.

The model was officially withdrawn from the market in the United Kingdom in 2004, and production of right hand drive models ceased, following the arrival of the new and more practical Panda. The left hand drive model was facelifted meanwhile, gaining a new design for the wheels, and the introduction of the new Fiat logo to the rear.

=== Fiat 600 ===
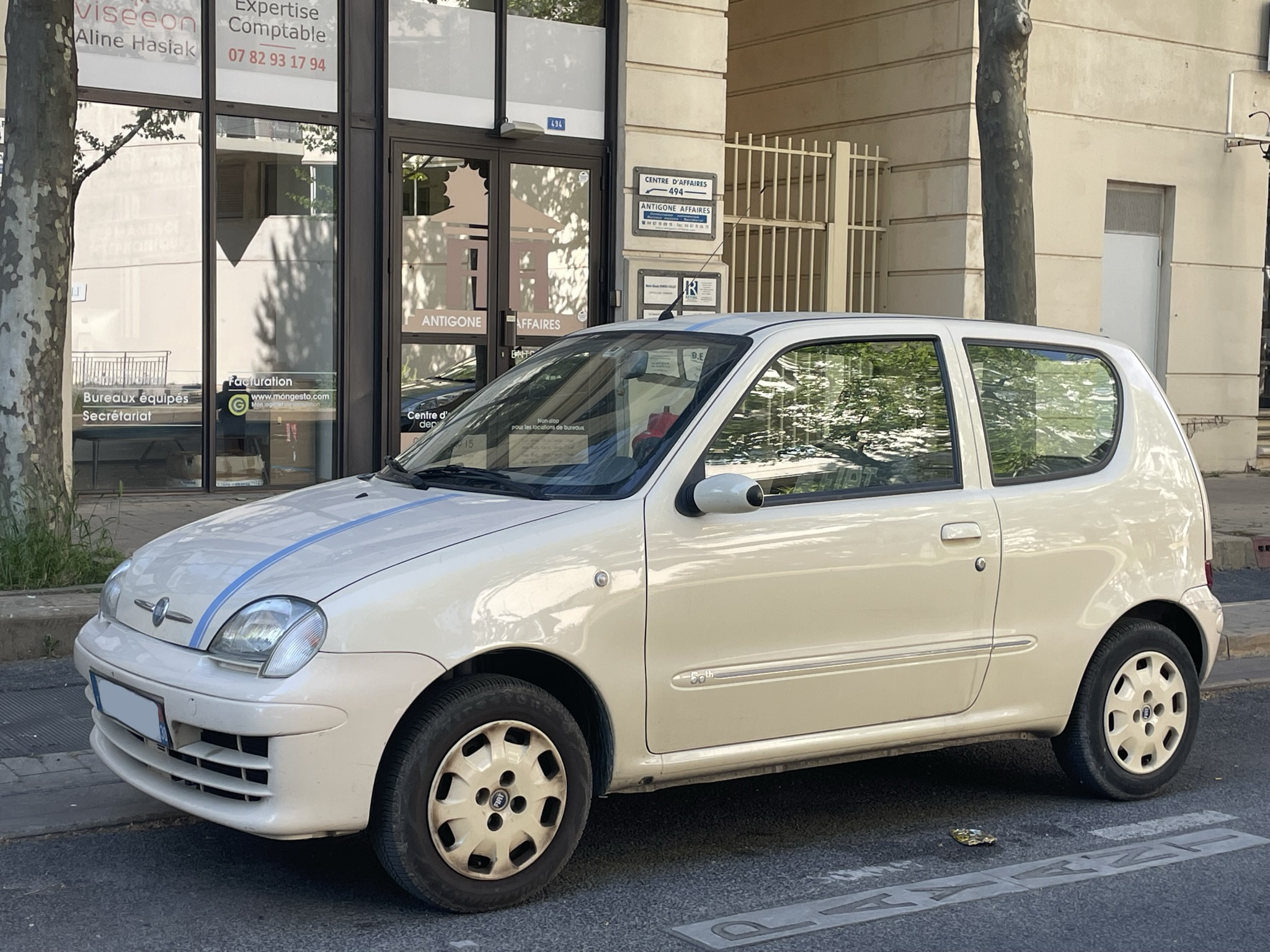
Fiat 600 50th Anniversary

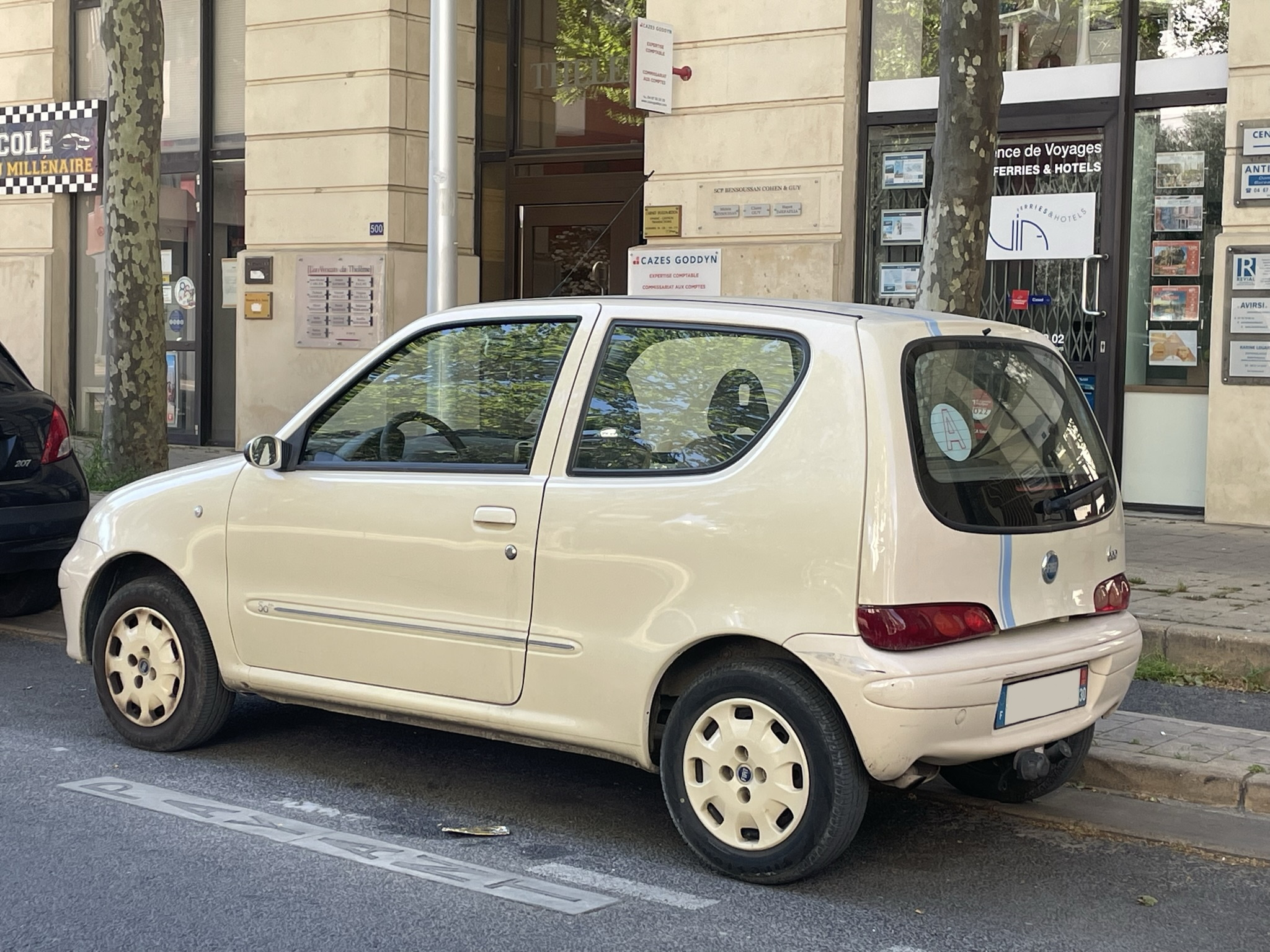
Fiat 600 50th Anniversary

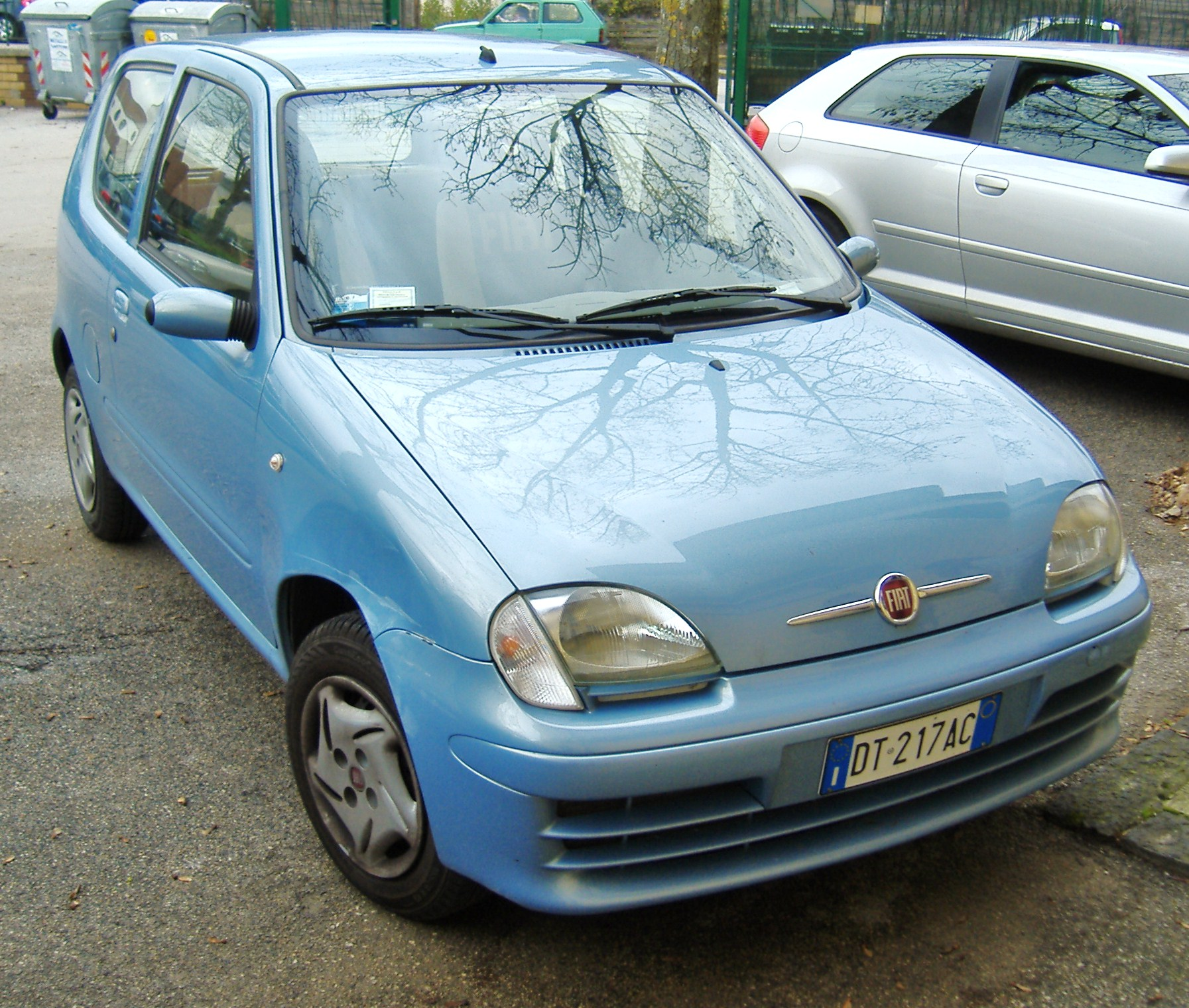
Late Fiat 600 (red logo)

In 2005, the name Seicento was replaced by 600 (in celebration of the 50th anniversary of the first edition, in 1955) together with some changes to the front fascia and in the interior with the name Fiat now written on the seats. The new versions now are named "Class" and "50th Anniversary", denoting the strict relationship between this model and the previous one.

=== Engines ===
The Seicento was available with two engines: the old 899 cc pushrod, 29 kW (40 PS; 39 hp) engine used in early base S and SX models (which was removed from West European markets due to emissions regulations), and the 1,108 cc FIRE, producing 40 kW (54 PS; 54 hp) and used in the Sporting version since launch. Both used single point injection.

The latter was fitted universally with multi point fuel injection from 2001, replacing the old 899 cc unit due to the tightening emission regulations.

=== Elettra ===
Until 2005, Fiat also produced a battery-electric version of the Seicento called the Seicento Elettra. Originally produced in serial quantities in Italy from 1996 to 1998, production moved to Poland for the remaining years where it was built to order. The Seicento Elettra featured a 30 kW three-phase asynchronous electric motor powered by eighteen 12V lead-acid batteries in the engine bay and beneath the rear seats.

The Seicento Elettra's top speed was 100 km/h (62 mph) and its range was 90 kilometres (56 mi).

=== Tuning ===
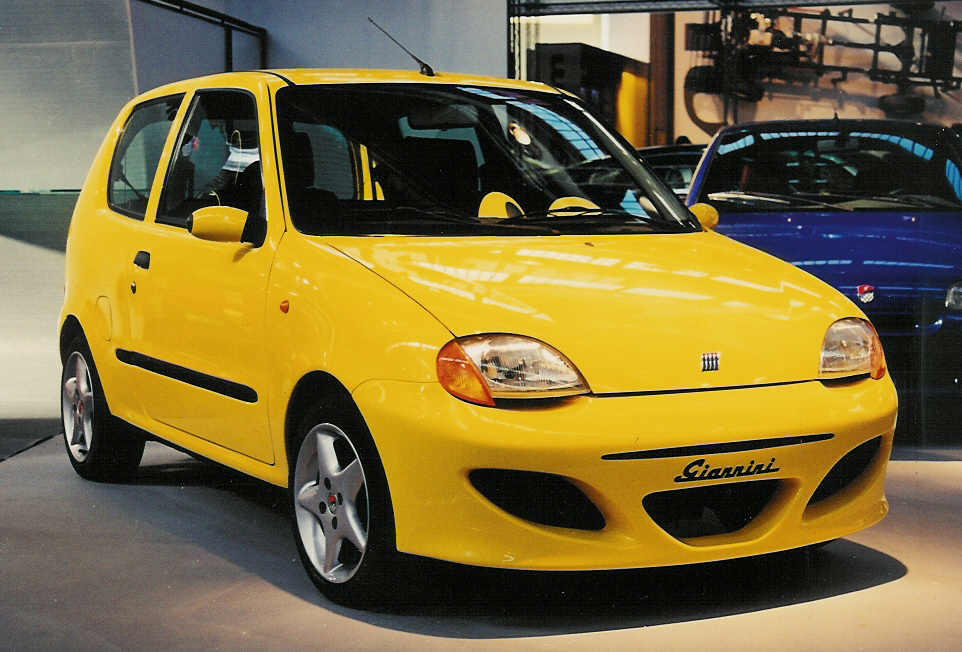
Giannini Seicento

German tuner Novitec created a special edition of the Fiat Seicento, adding a turbocharger and six-speed gearbox to the little car. The German tuner is able to extract 74 kW (100 PS; 99 hp) from the 1,108 cc FIRE engine. Other tuners include the Giannini company, who produced an aggressive bodykit and also considered installing a 1.6 litre engine.

== Future replacement ==
The car ceased production in 2010. Although no direct replacement was announced, much of the market territory it once occupied had already been filled by the new Fiat Panda (2003) and the 500 (2007), as well as the budget model Fiat Palio.

== Production figures ==
Year	Production (units)
1997	633
1998	152,755
1999	253,345
2000	236,283
2001	175,092
2002	143,923
2003	115,504
2004	69,317
2005	54,918
2006	46,115
2007	35,976
2008	25,166
2009	10,794
2010	9,152
