= Fiat Mini platform =

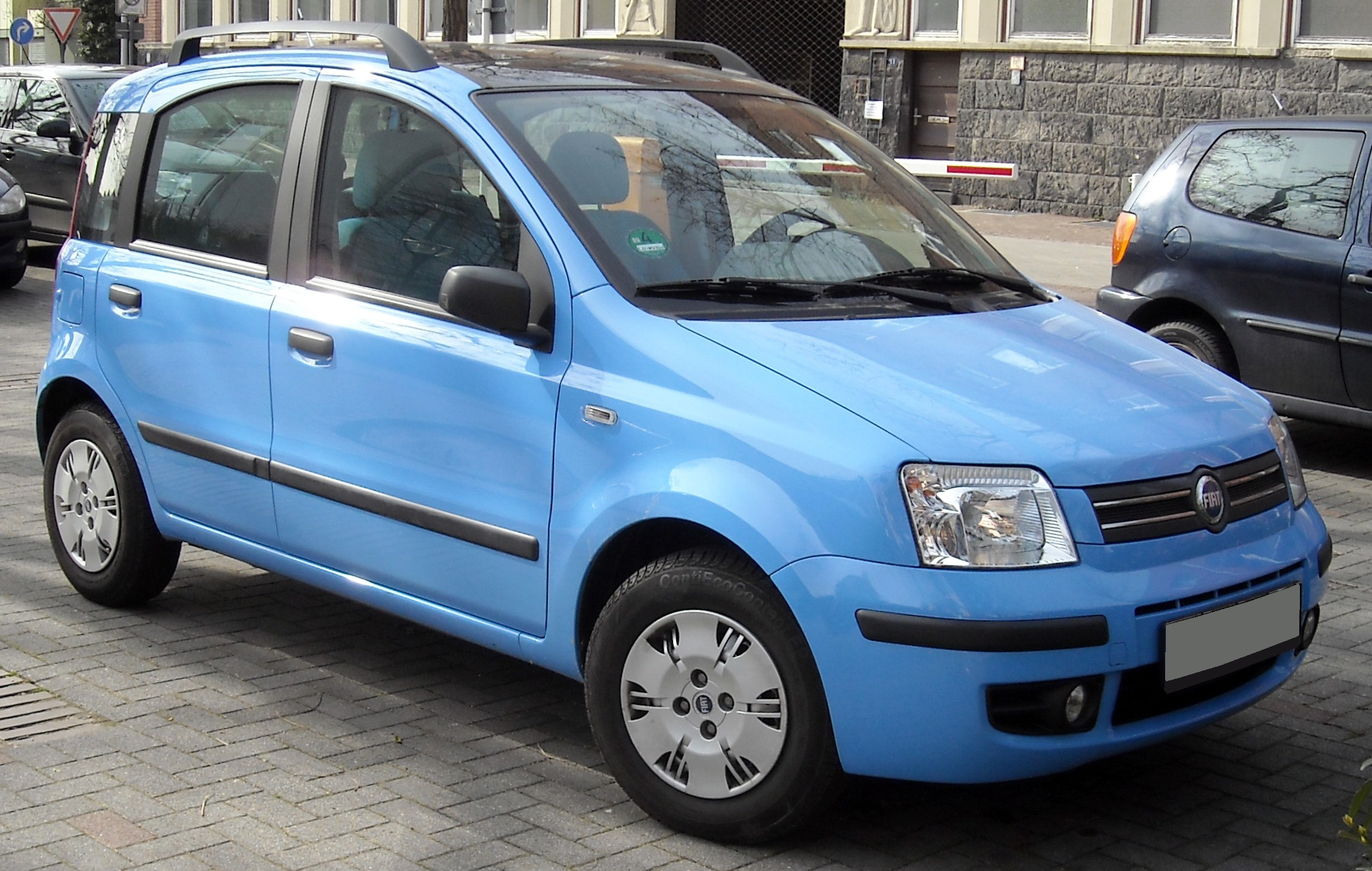

Overview
- Manufacturer: Fiat Auto (2003–2007); Fiat Group Automobiles (2007–2014); Fiat Chrysler Automobiles (2014–2021); Stellantis (2021–present)
- Production: 2003–present

Body and chassis
- Class: City car
- Layout: Transverse Front-engine, front-wheel-drive or four-wheel-drive

Chronology
- Predecessor: Fiat Type Zero platform
- Successor: Smart Car Platform

The Fiat Mini platform is an automobile platform shared among city cars of the Fiat Group.

== Specification ==
Developed in the late 1990s in Turin, Italy, the Mini platform was designed to be adaptable to the city cars sold by Fiat Group. The Mini platform replaced the old Panda platform (code project Type Zero; Tipo Zero in Italian) dating back to 1980. All components were completely new, and were made to be adaptable to more types of small vehicles (including hatchback, convertible and crossover SUV). The frame makes heavy use of high-strength steel. Cars built on the Mini platform can accommodate either front- or four-wheel drive, using only front-mounted transverse engines. The standard version was of the platform is designed for MacPherson strut front suspension and torsion beam rear suspension but the four wheel drive version was re-engineered with independent semi-trailing arms rear suspension and electronic limited-slip differential. A concept version was used in the 1999 Fiat Ecobasic prototype, powered by a small 1.2 JTD Multijet engine, but the first production vehicle on the platform was the Mk2 Fiat Panda in 2003 – a five-door hatchback with a high roof which allowed for increased interior space compared to most of its competitors.

The architecture has been developed for production by Fiat in Poland, in Mexico by Chrysler (when the Fiat 500 was adapted for sale in the USA) and later in Italy at Pomigliano d'Arco plant (when production of the Fiat Panda Mk3 began there). The Mini platform has a wheelbase of 2,299mm in the standard version (2,305mm in 4x4 version), which is used on the Fiat Panda Mk2. In 2007, the platform spawned two smaller three-door hatchbacks: the Fiat 500 and Ford Ka Mk2. A long-wheelbase version (2,390mm) of the platform was used in the Lancia Ypsilon Mk3, launched in 2011. In 2012, the third-generation Fiat Panda was launched, again using the standard-wheelbase version, but at the 2,305mm wheelbase previously used only for the 4x4 mode. Vehicles based on Fiat Mini platform:

- 1999 Fiat Ecobasic concept car
- 2003–2012 Fiat Panda Mk2
- 2005–2010 Fiat Panda Hydrogen
- 2007–present Fiat 500
- 2008–2016 Ford Ka Mk2
- 2011–2024 Lancia Ypsilon Mk3
- 2012–present Fiat Panda Mk3

=== Gallery ===
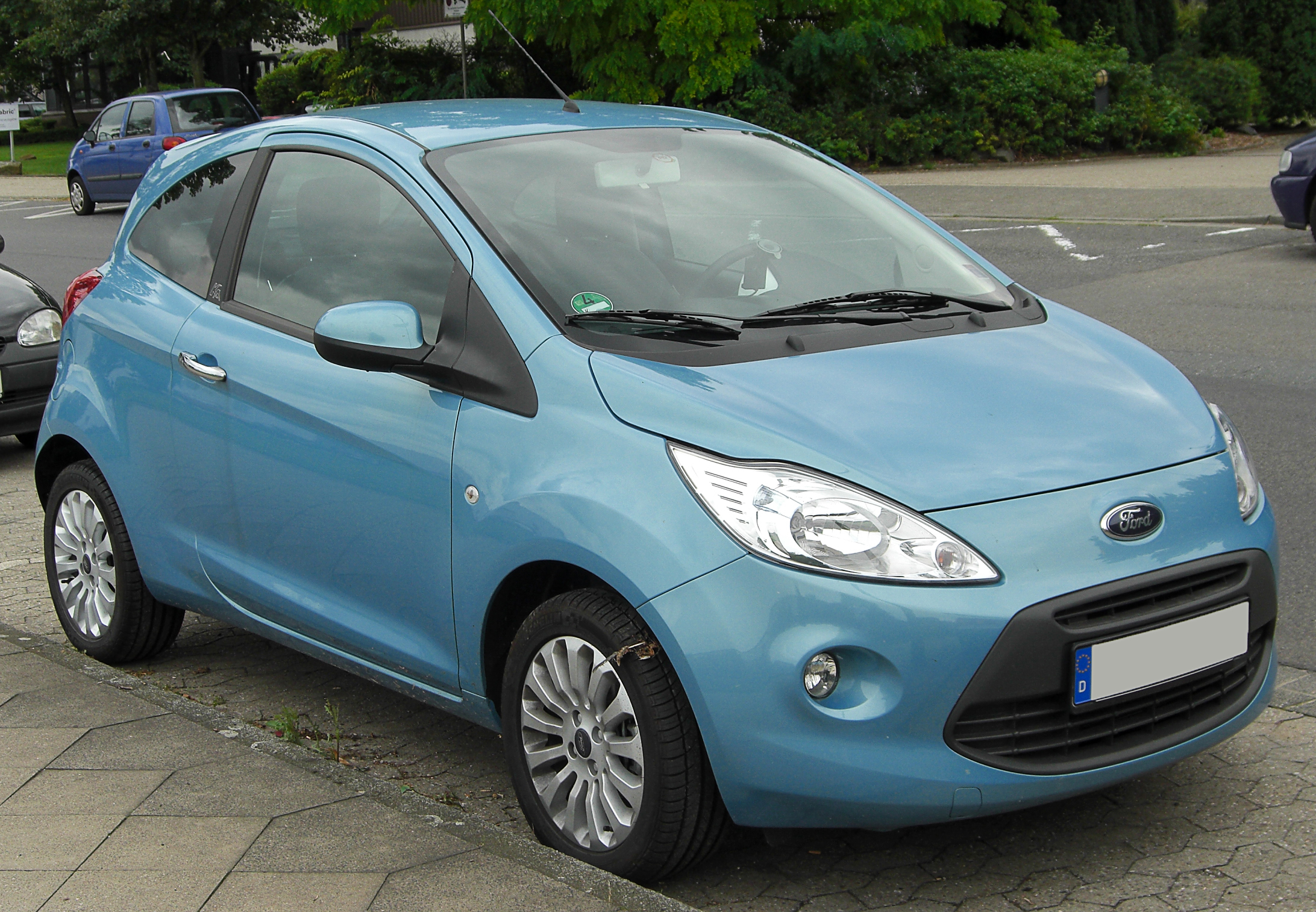
Ford Ka

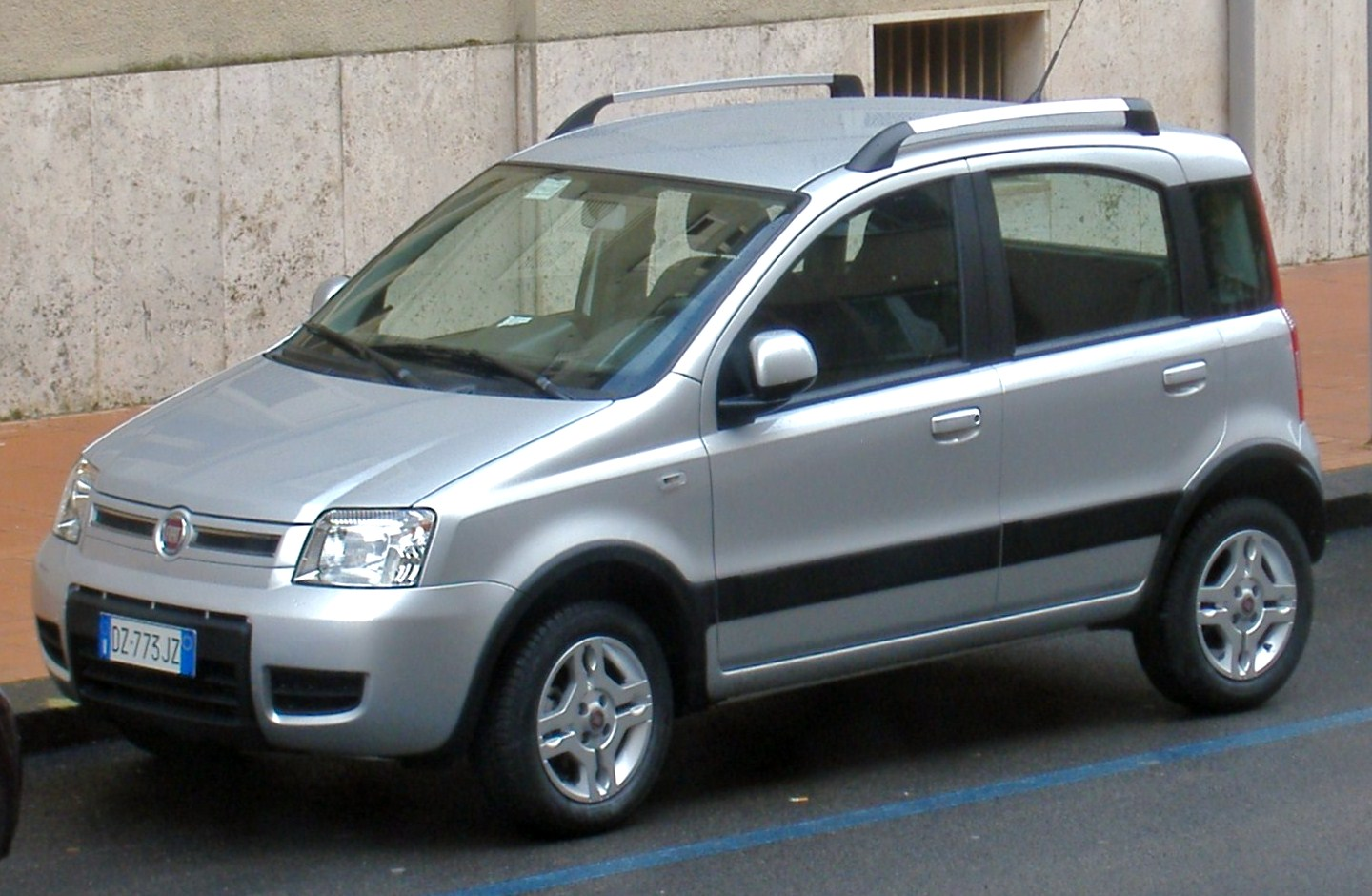
Fiat Panda (2003)

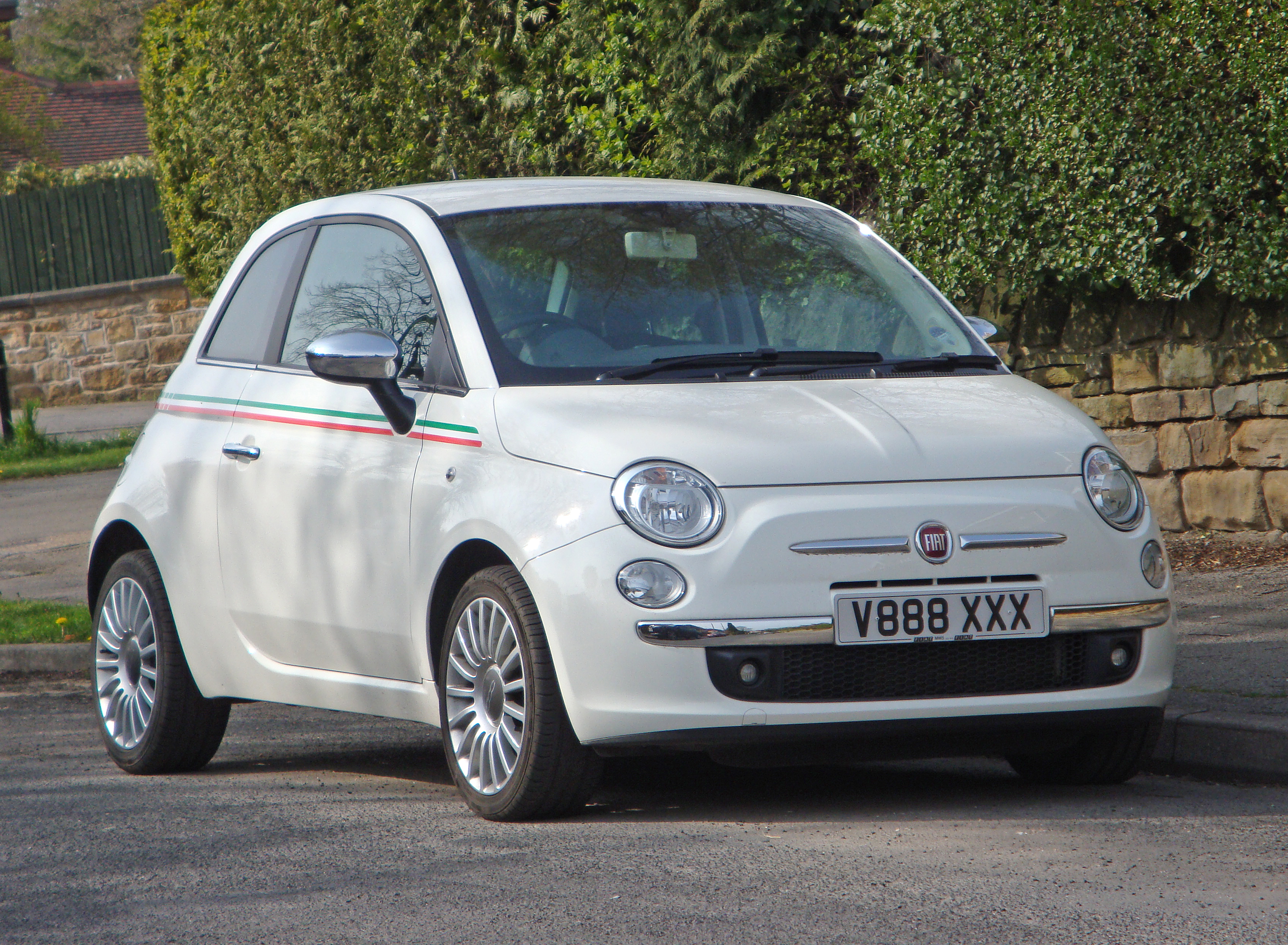
Fiat 500

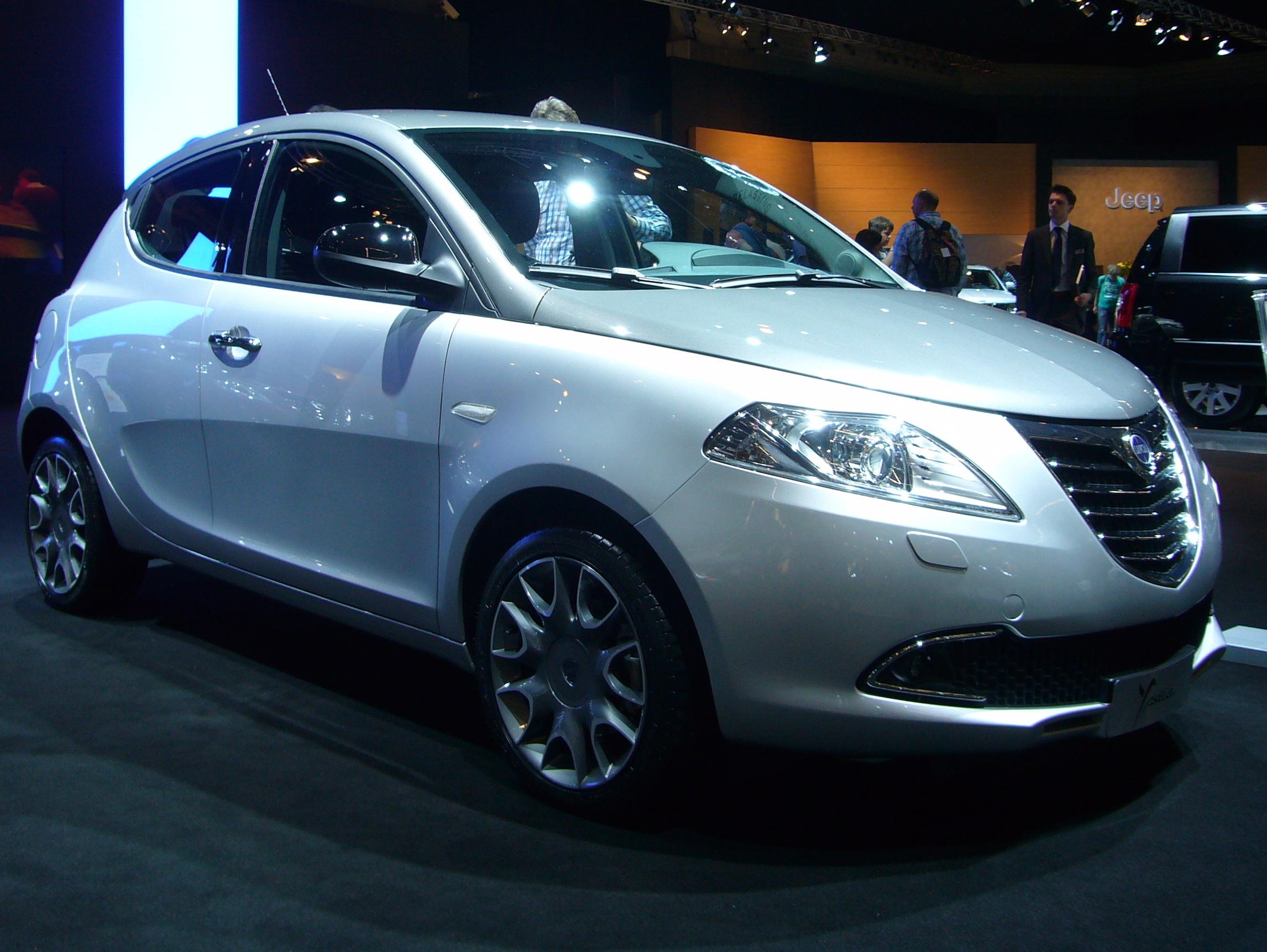
Lancia Ypsilon

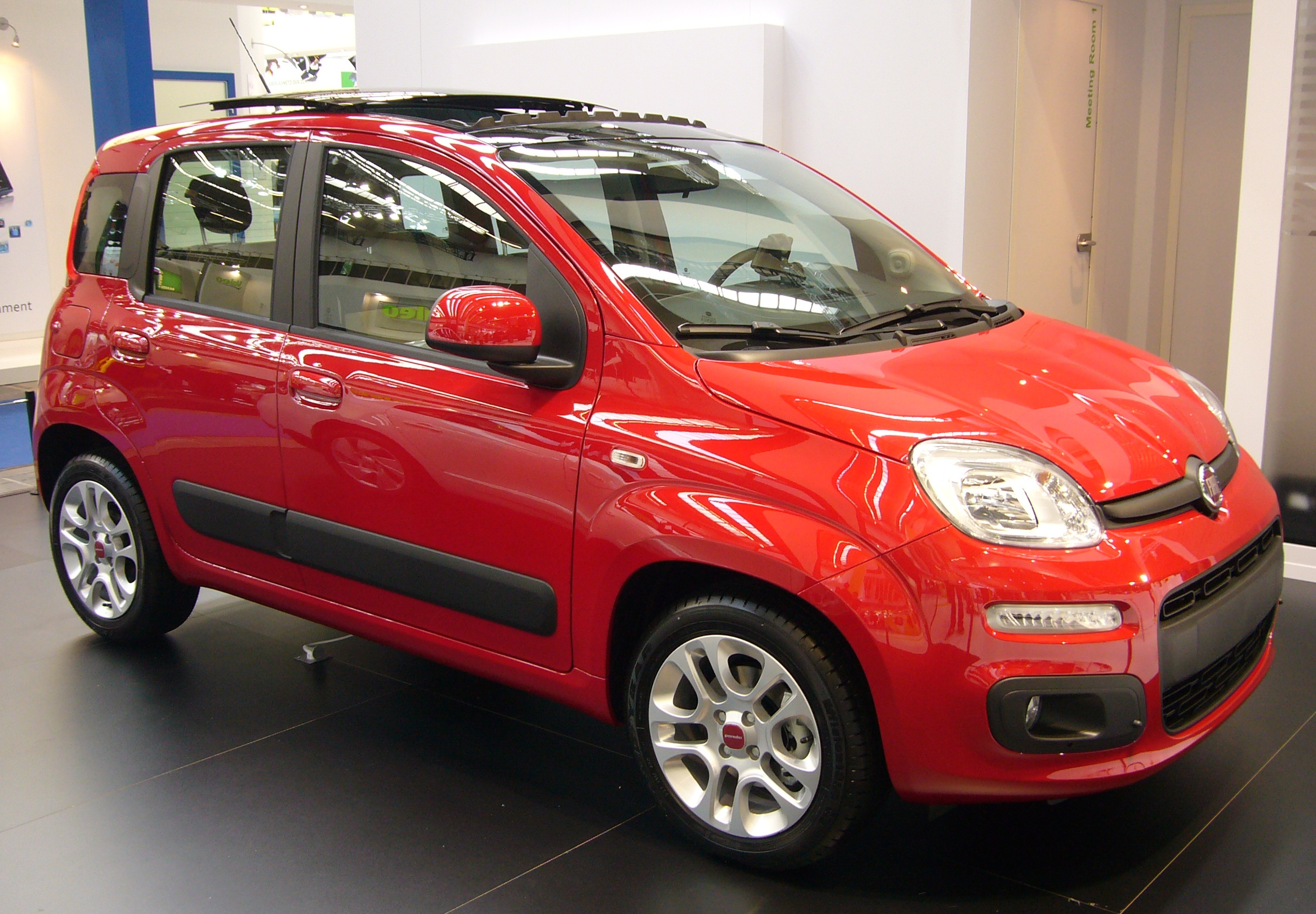
Fiat Panda (2011)

== Economy platform ==
The Economy platform, is a chassis created for the small low cost vehicle produced by FCA in South America. It is a new platform introduced first with the Fiat Uno (codeproject 327) in 2010 assembly in Betim, Brasil. Fiat said "the Panda and Uno were born together in design and share the same concept, but have no mechanical parts in common". Fiat claims that the Uno uses 82% new components, being based on the old Fiat Palio. A long wheelbase version was also used in the second generation of Palio (326) and Grand Siena (326 3V). In 2014 Fiat introduced the Brazilian Fiorino based on the modified Uno (327) chassis with rear axle from the Fiat Strada pick up, and in 2016 the smaller Fiat Mobi introduced a new version of the Economy platform engineering to a lower cost.

The successor of the FCA Economy platform was the new FCA MP1 (Modular Platform 1) chassis introduced in 2017 with the new Fiat Argo. Vehicles based on Fiat Economy ("Low Cost") platform:

- 2010–2021, Fiat Uno (327)
- 2011–2017, Fiat Palio (326)
- 2012–2021, Fiat Grand Siena (326) / Dodge Vision
- 2013–present, Fiat Fiorino (327) / Ram ProMaster Rapid/Ram V700 Rapid
- 2016–present, Fiat Mobi
- 2022–present, Peugeot Partner Rapid (327)

=== Gallery ===
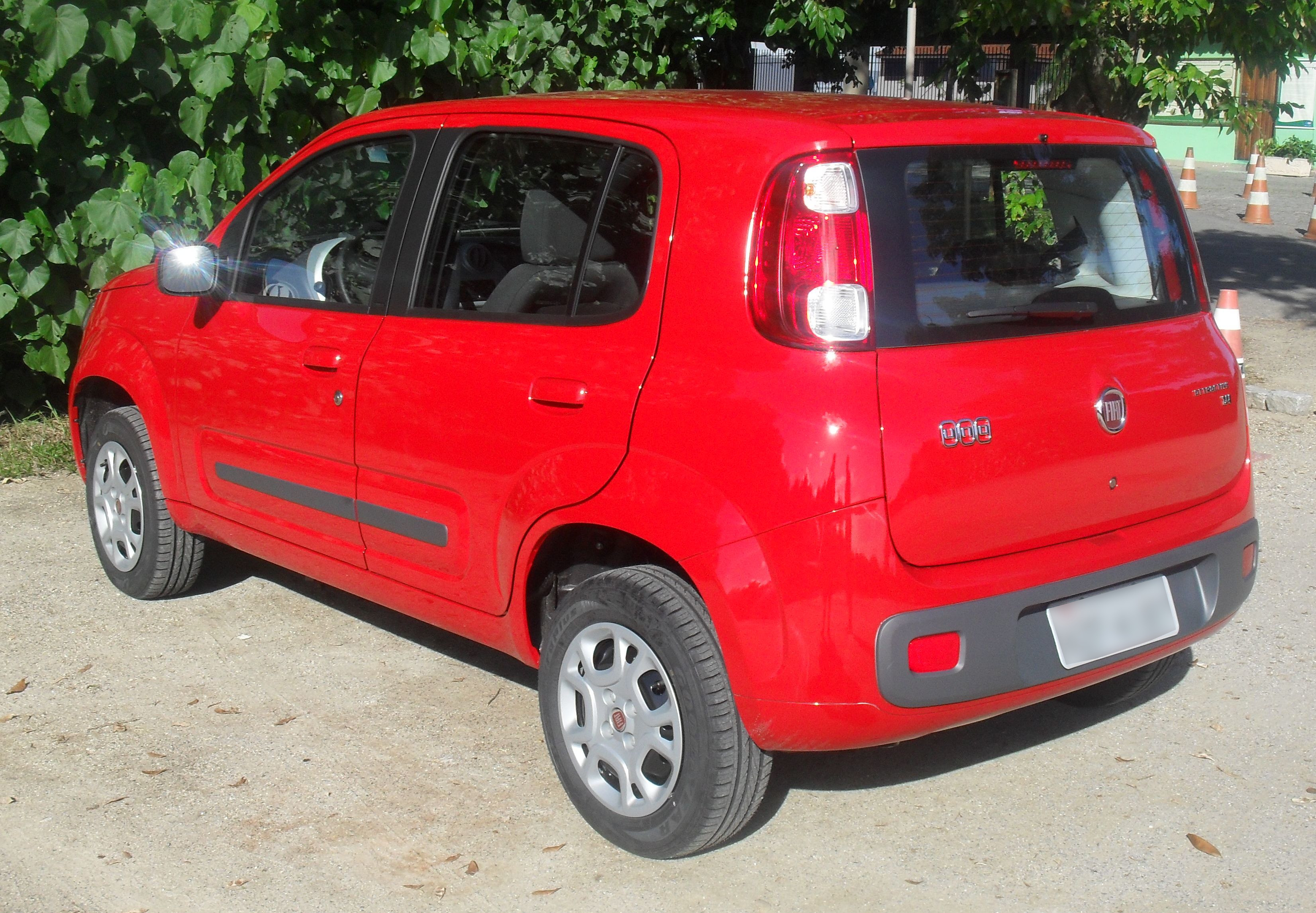
Fiat Uno (Brazil)

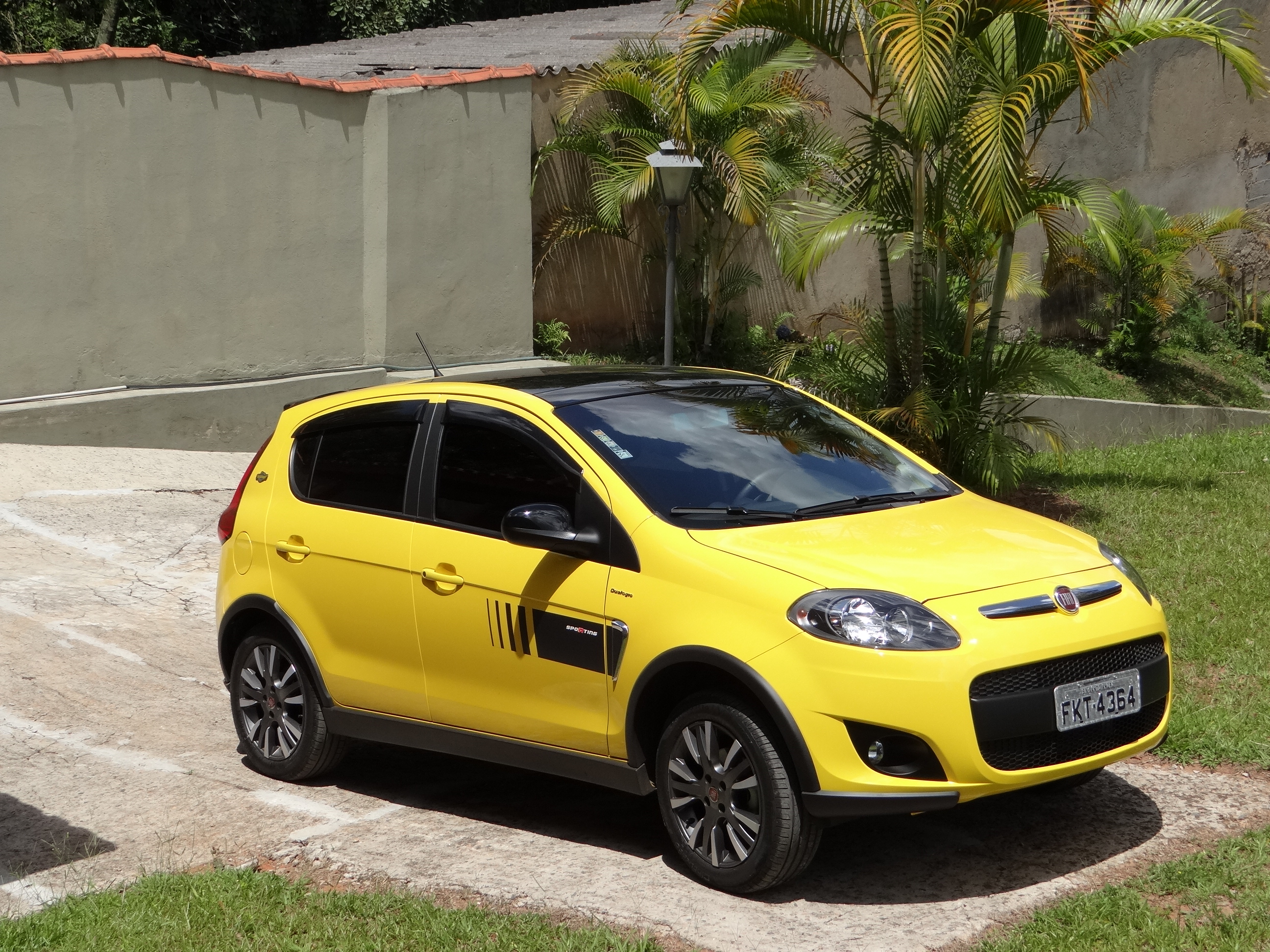
Fiat Palio Mk2

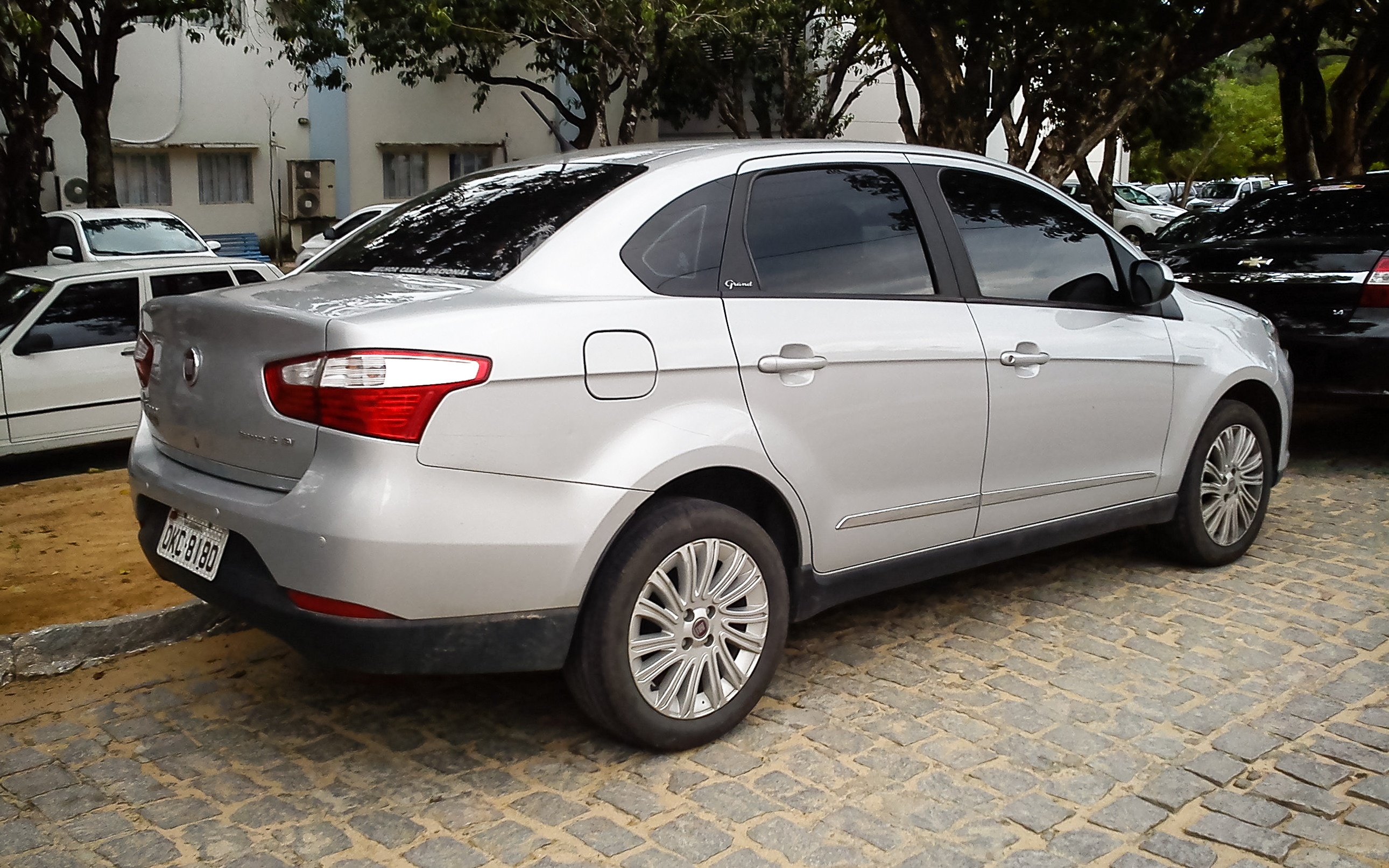
Fiat Grand Siena

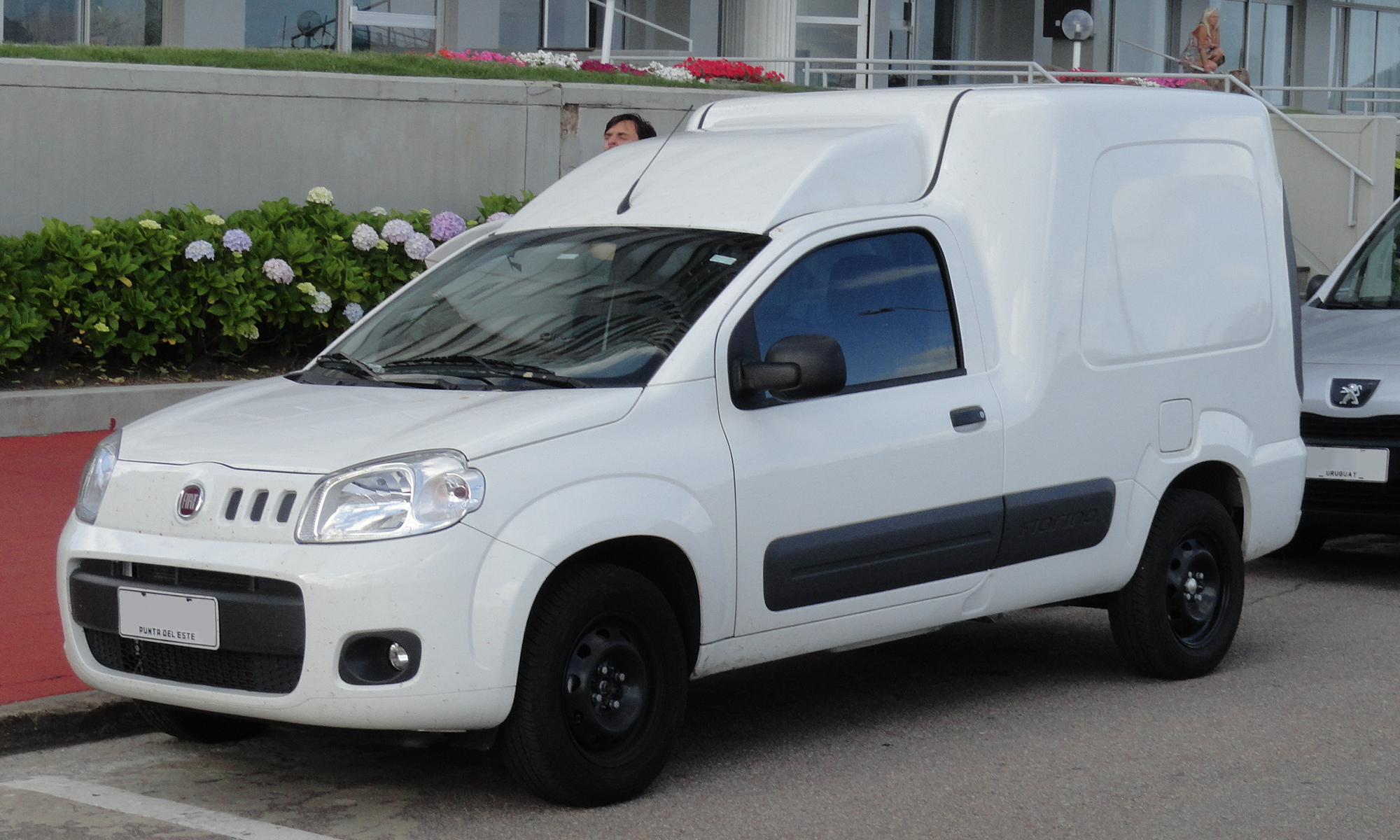
Fiat Fiorino Mk3 (Brazil)
