= Fiat Ecobasic =

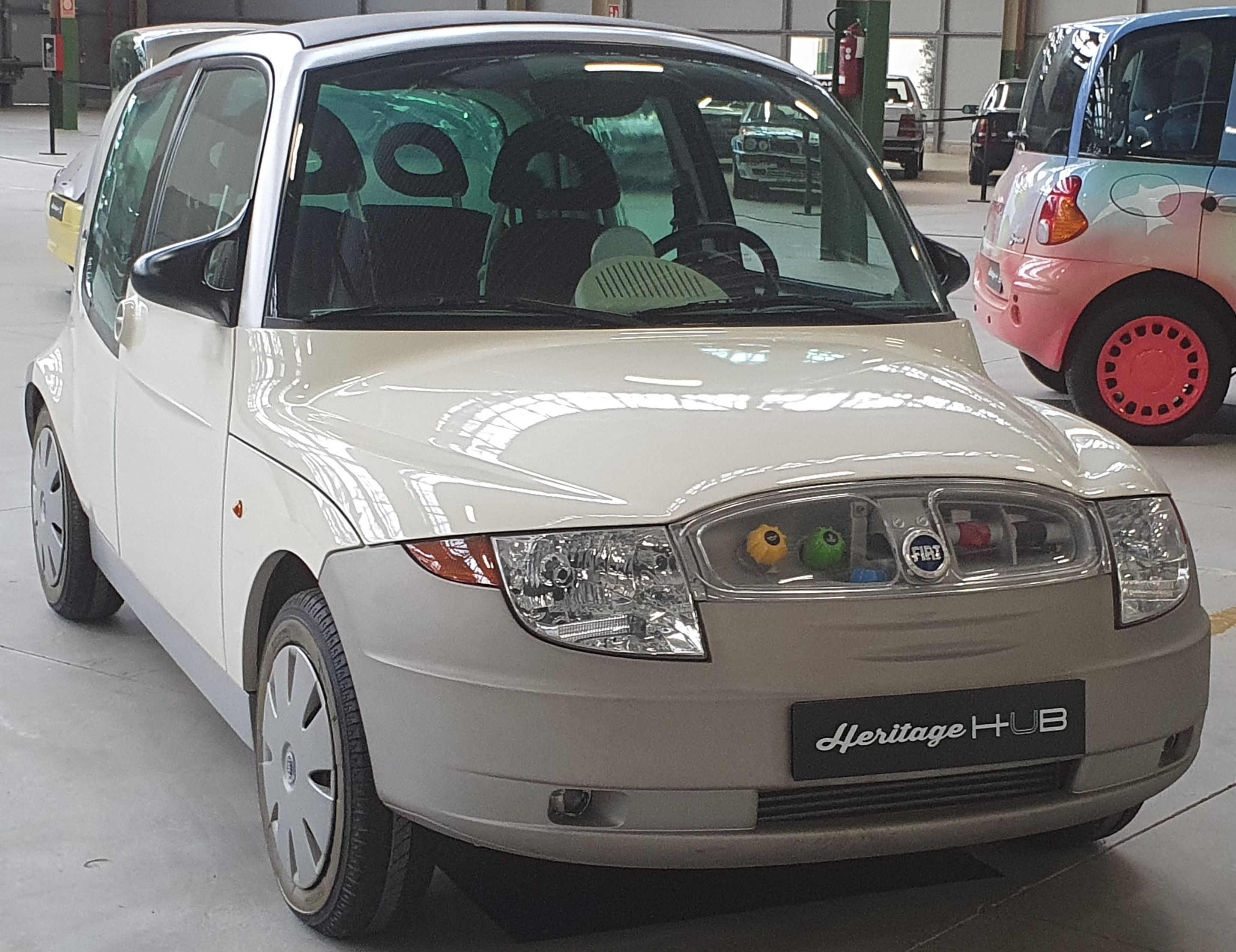
- An example exhibited by FCA Heritage

Overview
- Manufacturer: Fiat
- Production: 1999–2000
- Assembly: Italy
- Designer: Roberto Giolito at Centro Stile Fiat in collaboration with Zagato

Body and chassis
- Class: Concept car
- Body style: 5-door hatchback
- Layout: Front-engine, front-wheel-drive
- Platform: Fiat Mini platform
- Related: Fiat Panda

Powertrain
- Engine: 1.2 L JTD Multijet 16v common rail
- Transmission: 5-speed automatic

Dimensions
- Length: 3,480 mm (137.0 in)
- Width: 1,710 mm (67.3 in)
- Height: 1,490 mm (58.7 in)
- Kerb weight: 750 kg (1,653 lb)

The Fiat Ecobasic is a concept car designed by the Italian manufacturer Fiat and presented in December 1999 at the Bologna Motor Show and exhibited in March 2000 at the Geneva Motor Show.

The purpose of this concept was to prove that it was possible to design and build a car capable of transporting four adults in a structure made of fully recyclable composite materials and whose production and operating costs were ultra-low.

== Overview ==
The Ecobasic has been homologated according to Euro NCAP standards; moreover, the materials that cover the structure are all recyclable. The design of the concept has been studied in the wind tunnel, boasting a drag coefficient of just 0.28.

The front grille included a sort of transparent hatch that gave direct access to the coolant and oil reservoirs, as well as the positive and negative battery terminals. After manufacturing 10 units of the Ecobasic, the brand decided not to put it into production.

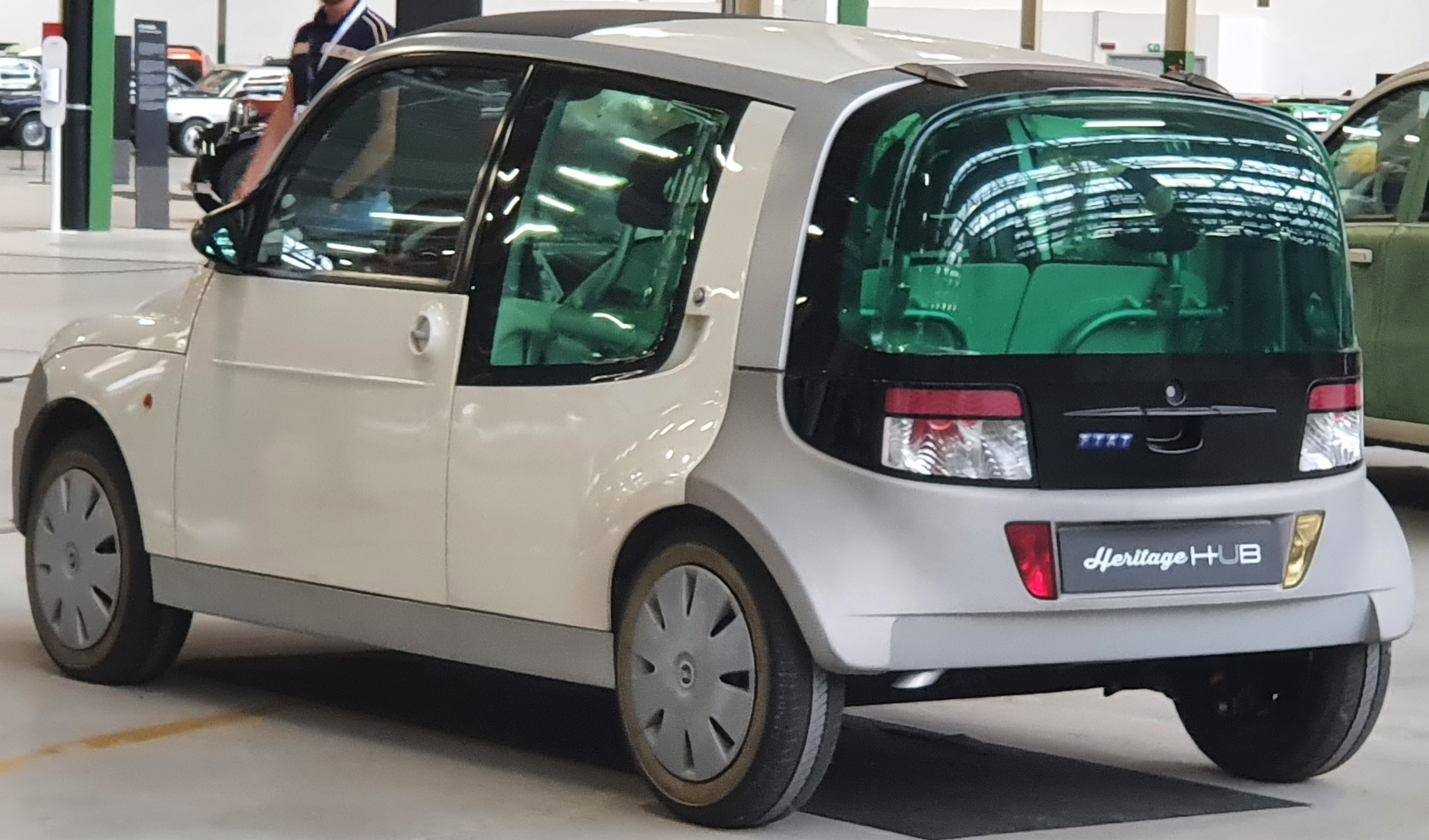
Rear view

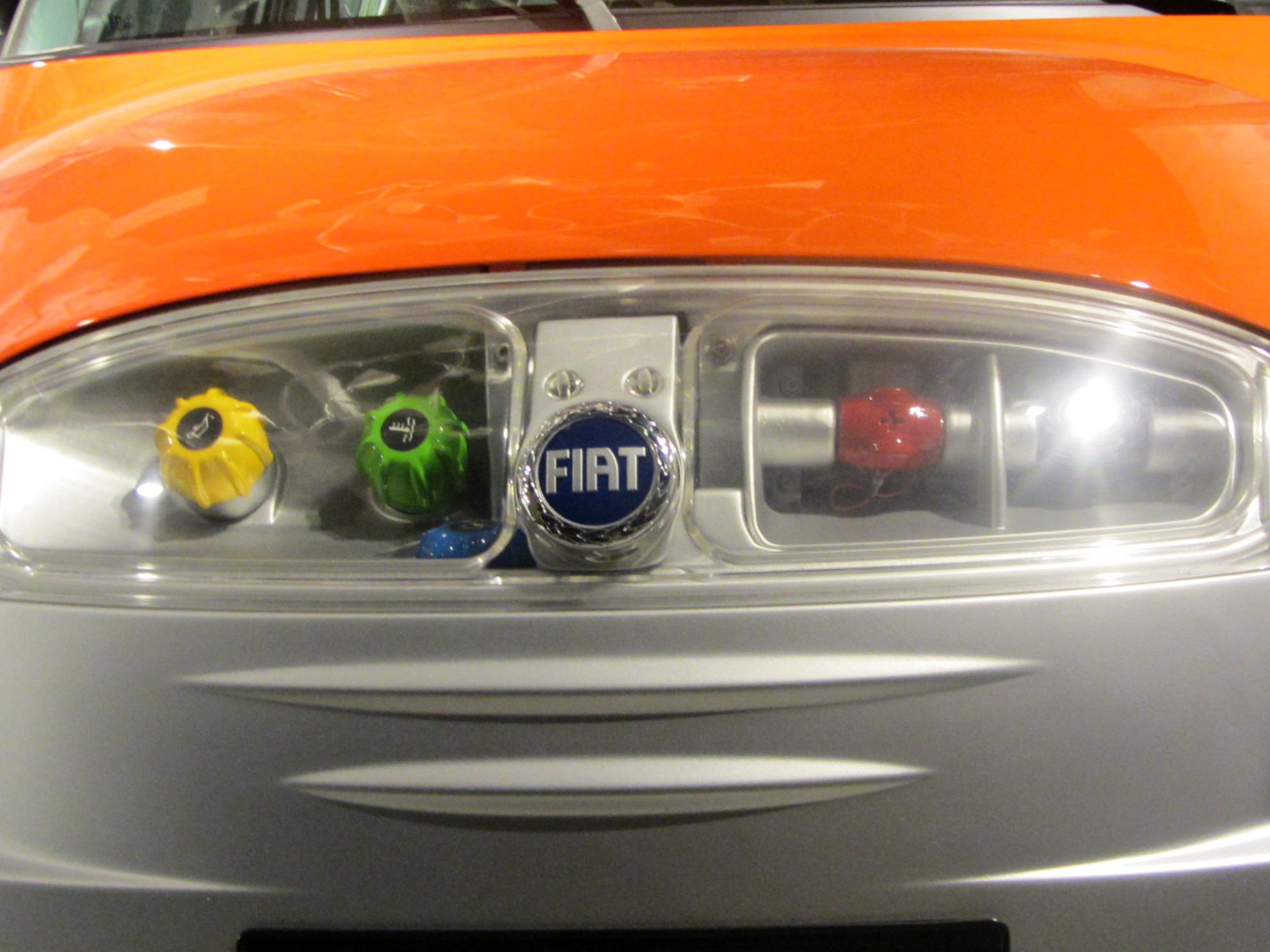
Front grille
