= Licensed production =

Production under license of technology developed elsewhere

Licensed production is the production under license of technology developed elsewhere. The licensee provides the licensor of a specific product with legal production rights, technical information, process technology, and any other proprietary components that cannot be sourced by the licensor.

This is an especially prominent commercial practice in developing nations, which often approach licensed production as a starting point for indigenous industrial development. While licensed production in developing nations provides stimulus to the production and technical capabilities of local industry, in many cases it remains at least partly dependent on foreign support.

== History ==
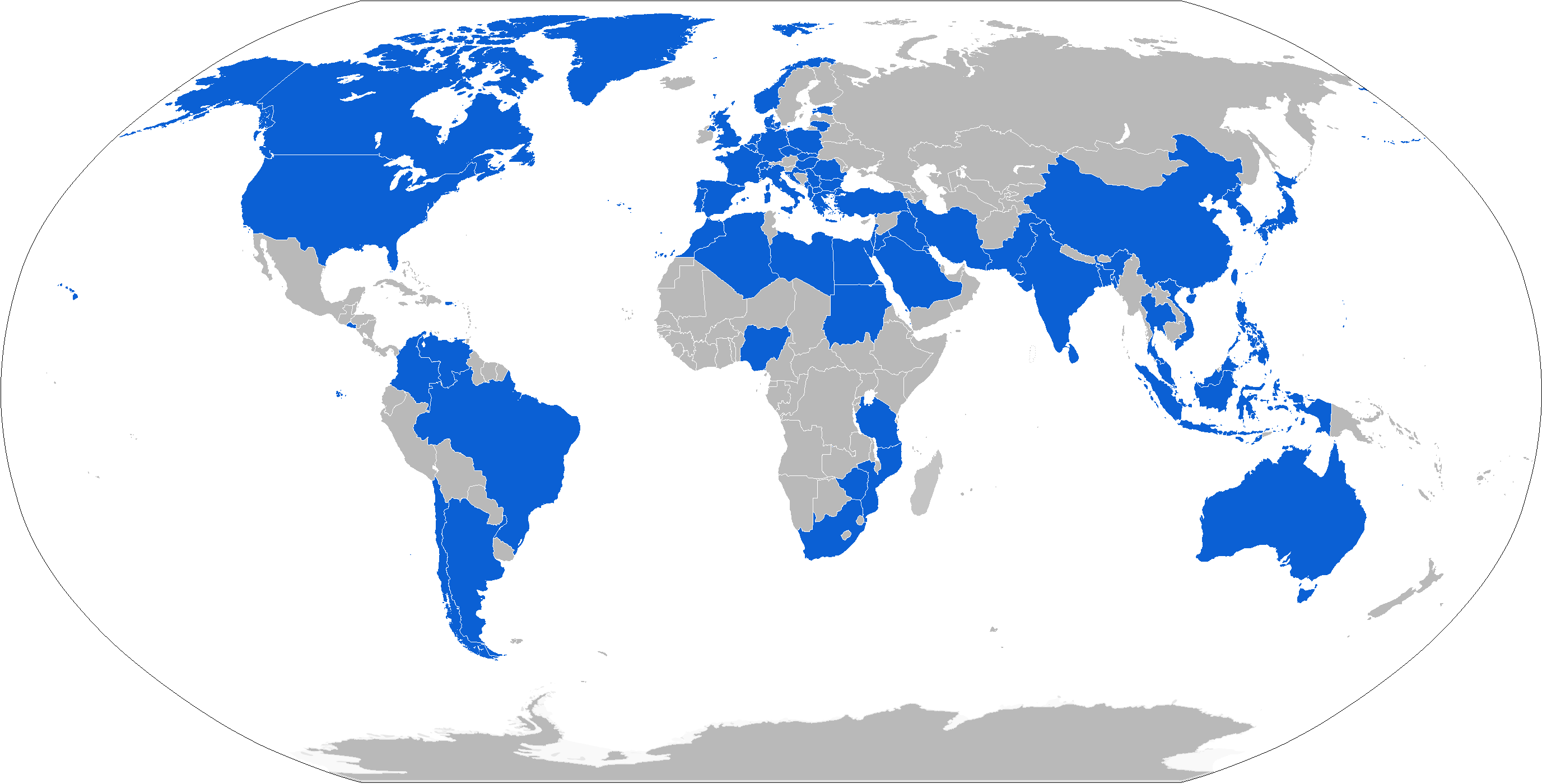
An example of global licensing agreements: national governments which have purchased foreign licenses to manufacture arms and ammunition are depicted in blue.

The four most common applications of licensed production have historically been automotive engines and parts, weaponry, aircraft, and pharmaceuticals. During World War I, it was more common for licensing agreements to take place between companies in the same country; for example, Opel was granted a license to produce BMW-designed aircraft engines for the German war effort.

During the 1920s, European economists began advocating licensed production of foreign goods as the cure for "industrial particularism"—it allowed countries to bypass the costly research and development stage of acquiring products with which their own industries were unfamiliar, and refocus on the domestic manufacture of preexisting overseas designs. This allowed for a much higher rate of production, and was considerably cheaper than national sourcing and off-the-shelf acquisition. European automobile manufacturers were the first to adopt this practice, producing a number of specialized American components for their passenger cars under license. The United States not only supplied European factories with the necessary blueprints and licenses, but also sourced American-made tooling equipment accordingly, which allowed the automobile companies to optimize their production lines. By the 1960s it was not uncommon for an entire specialized industry—such as the manufacture of rotary aircraft in the United Kingdom—to be dependent wholly on foreign-licensed components.

A number of countries began making improvements to foreign products manufactured under license, and were even able to re-export them successfully. This trend resulted in some technology suppliers imposing additional conditions on the licensee. The United States began inserting pro forma statements into licensing agreements known as "side letters", which required the free sharing of any improvements made to American technology. Other attempts were also made to control the destination of licensed products, particularly with regards to the arms industry. For instance, France stipulated that military vehicles manufactured in South Africa under a French license were not to be exported to other foreign nations without its express approval. Yet another form of common licensing restriction related solely to the licensing activity, regulating whether the specified product was fully produced or partly assembled, and whether entire products or their individual components were manufactured. The governments of Germany and Switzerland imposed similar restrictions on military vehicles manufactured in Argentina and Chile under license.

In some cases, the original technology supplier did not need to manufacture the product itself—it merely patented a specific design, then sold the actual production rights to multiple clients. This resulted in different companies separately manufacturing identical products licensed from the same licensee. For many licensee companies, licensed production by other firms provides a continuous outlet for their proprietary technology, increasing their return on investment and prolonging the economic life of the product.

Developing nations began accounting for a significant percentage of licensed production during the late twentieth century. Governments of developing nations often sought to encourage rapid industrialization, reduce dependence on foreign imports, and combat high levels of unemployment by creating and retaining local jobs. However, in many of these nations there was not a strong tradition of technology-based industrial development, and local firms were seldom active participants in creating indigenous technology through research and development. Since their research capacity was typically too limited to meet their goals, adopting licensing agreements for foreign technology was an especially attractive option. Manufacturing licensed products generated employment and empowered local industry while reducing dependence on imports. It also avoided the risks inherent in the development of new products by taking advantage of the proven reputation of products which had already achieved success in foreign markets. The economic life of many products, namely in the automotive and defense sectors, have been prolonged by overseas licensed production long after they were considered obsolete in their countries of origin.

Developing nations such as Pakistan and Singapore which built important segments of their industry on licensed production have now themselves become licensors of technology and products to less developed states.

== Theoretical basis ==
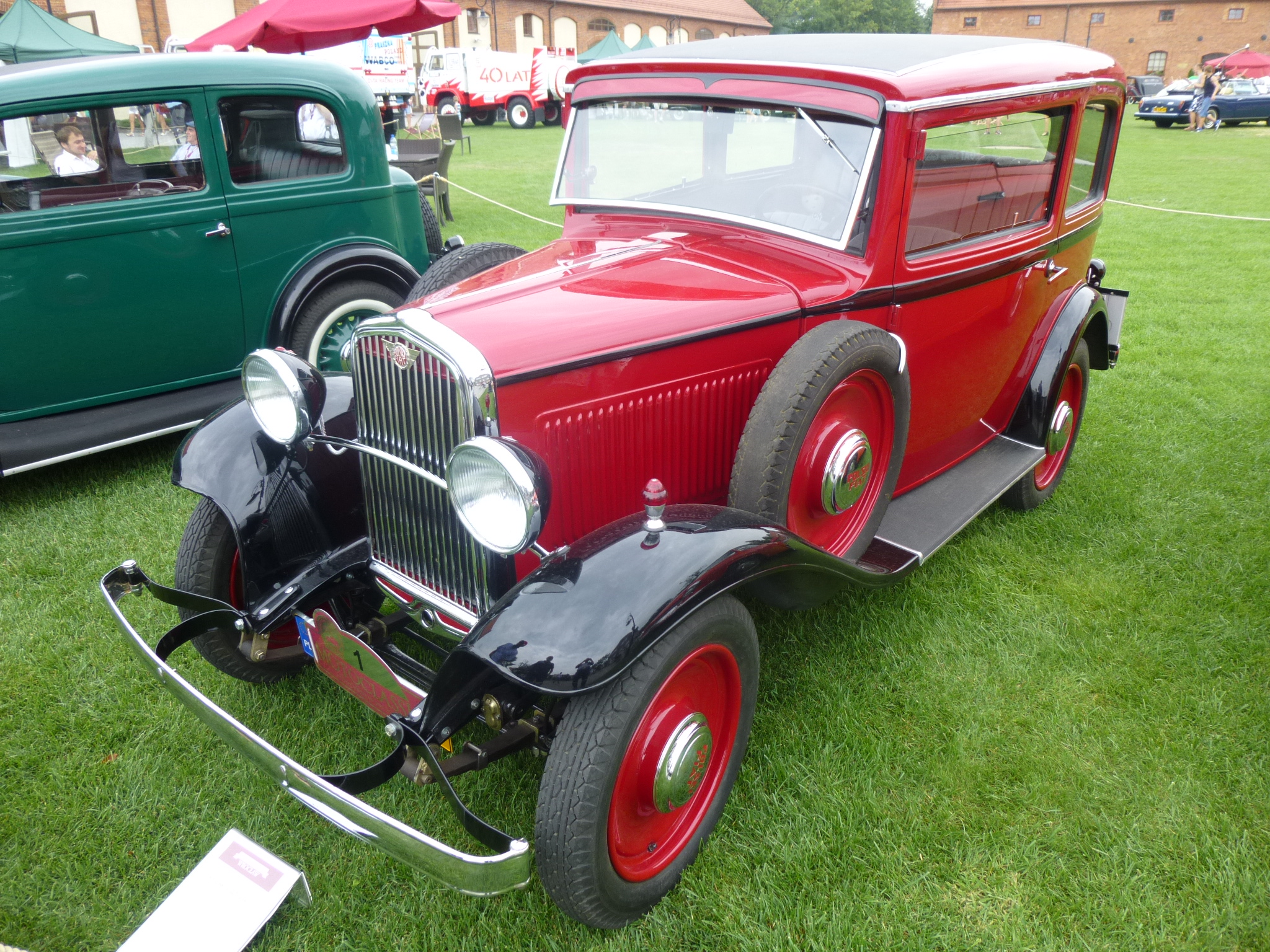
1933 Fiat 508 manufactured under license in Poland by Polski Fiat.

Licensed production is defined as an overseas production arrangement, usually as a direct result of inter-state trade agreements, that permits a foreign government or entity to acquire the technical information to manufacture all or part of an equipment or component patented in the exporting country. According to the World Intellectual Property Organization (WIPO), it must constitute a partnership between an intellectual property owner and a licensee who is authorized to use such rights under certain conditions. The licensee is manufacturing a product for which it has been granted production rights under specific conditions, while the licensor retains ownership of the intellectual property thereof. In some cases the licensor will supply the necessary technical data, prototypes, and/or machine tools to the licensee.

While licensed production is often dependent on the appropriate technology transfers, it does not necessarily entail ownership and management of the overseas production by the technology supplier. However, the licensor does retain the right to continue to use the licensed property, and to attribute further licenses to third parties. Occasionally, licensees may themselves sub-license a third party with or without the agreement of the intellectual property owner.

Licensing agreements determine the form and scope of compensation to the intellectual property owner, which usually takes the form of a flat licensing fee or a running royalty payment derived from a share of the licensee's revenue. The licenses can be terminated by the licensor, or may expire after a set date; however, the technology and knowledge, once transferred, cannot be rescinded, so even if the licensing agreement expires they remain in the licensee's possession.

Two related commercial practices are foreign subcontractor production and the proliferation of knock-down kits. Foreign subcontracting occurs when a product's original manufacturer contracts the production of its individual parts and components to a second party overseas. Such arrangements are not considered examples of licensed production because they do not involve the explicit licensing of technological information. Knock-down kits are regarded as a prerequisite to licensed production; they consist of products assembled locally from imported, pre-manufactured parts.

== Quality control and unlicensed production ==
Some licensors find it difficult to regulate the quality of their products manufactured under license. It is not always made clear to consumers where exactly a particular good originated, and a poor quality licensed product may damage the reputation of the original licensor. However, this is not considered a form of consumer fraud unless the product is unlicensed or counterfeit.

Unlicensed production is the utilization of foreign manufacturing technology without a license, achieved through industrial espionage or reverse engineering. Products in high demand on the international market can be reproduced, based on the same or similar design, and branded in ways to make them indistinguishable from the original. When copied and reproduced without a license, certain items are sometimes recopied in a similar manner by a third party. The manufacturers responsible may also grant legitimately registered sub-licenses for their unlicensed products, profiting at the expense of the real intellectual property owner. The quality of unlicensed goods varies greatly; the United Nations Office on Drugs and Crime has noted that while licensing companies often provide quality control measures, and there is some incentive for licensees to comply or risk legal action and the ensuing damage to their own profit, manufacturers who engage in unlicensed production are under no such obligations.

Another method of circumventing the need for a license involves a manufacturer making slight modifications in the design or function of an existing product, before reproducing it. The manufacturer could then argue that the resulting product is not an unlicensed copy, but a new product not subject to license.

Also need to be noted that once the terms of the patent for the particular technology or invention has expired, any manufacturer could legally reverse-engineer and reproduce said technology without needing to negotiate license agreements with former patent holder. However, even after patent terms have lapsed some manufacturers do opt for licensed production, since such agreements also confer transfer of full manufacturing plans and expertise which may prove to be cheaper than acquiring those via reverse engineering.

== Examples ==
Industrial products which have been built under license include:

- The Belgian FN FAL battle rifle by FN Herstal, produced under license in fifteen countries.
- The German G3 battle rifle by Heckler & Koch, produced under license in eighteen countries.
- The Italian Aermacchi MB-326 trainer aircraft, produced under license in Australia, Brazil and South Africa.
- The British Folland Gnat trainer aircraft, produced under license in India.
- The American Northrop F-5 light fighter aircraft, produced under license in Taiwan.
- The Soviet Mikoyan-Gurevich MiG-21 multirole fighter aircraft, produced under license in India.
- The American General Dynamics F-16 multirole fighter aircraft, produced under license in South Korea.
- The British Canberra bomber aircraft, produced under license in the United States as the Martin B-57 Canberra.
- The French Aérospatiale Alouette III helicopter, produced under license in Romania, Switzerland, and India.
- The American Bell UH-1 Iroquois helicopter, produced under license in Germany, Japan, and Italy.
- The French Panhard AML armored car, produced under license in South Africa as the Eland Mk7.
- The French CM60A1 mortar, produced under license in South Africa.
- The Italian Fiat 125 passenger car, produced under license in Poland as the Polski Fiat 125p.
- The Soviet GAZ-M20 Pobeda sedan, produced under license in Poland as the FSO Warszawa.
- The Finnish Patria AMV armoured personnel carrier, produced under license in Japan, Poland, South Africa, and Croatia.

== See also ==
- Import substitution
- Local purchasing
- Mass production
- Badge engineering
- Upscaling
