= Poland (surname) =

Poland is an Irish surname that has been Anglicised from MacPoìlin. Outside of Ireland, it can be of English and German origin.

== Etymology ==
In some cases the English and German name is derived from the Middle High German Polan, which means "Poland". The surname originally signified a person with Polish connections.

In some cases, particularly in New England, the English Poland is an Americanized form of the French Poulin. This French surname originated from an occupational name of a poultry breeder, or from a fearful person; it is derived from the Old French poule, which means "chicken".

In other cases, particularly in Ireland, the English Poland is a variant of Polin, which is in turn an Anglicised form of the original Gaelic spelling of Mac Póilín, which translated from Irish means "son of little Paul". This Irish surname originated as a patronymic, derived from a pet form of the Irish Pól (the English form of which is Paul). There are multiple formulations of the anglicised spelling quite often with the 'Mac' or 'Mc' removed, including: (Mc)Poland, (Mc)Polin, (Mc)Polland, (Mc)Pullen, (Mc)Pullin, (Mc)Polan which in Ireland come from the same original Gaelic.

The variety in spelling of this Irish surname and the examples where the 'Mac' or 'Mc' has been dropped can be explained for several reasons. In English controlled areas of Ireland (especially around The Pale), it was declared that the Irish take on names in an English form and many were required to do so in order to do business with the powers that be, or to obtain a tenancy on English controlled land.

Census takers were also allowed to use either form, with or without the Gaelic prefix. It also was not uncommon for the 'Mac' or 'Mc' prefix to simply be incorporated into the surname to result in one word e.g. Magawley, Maginnis.

A further reason for the variety in anglicised forms of the surname can be explained, as Irish Catholic priests, whilst literate, were only required to record surname spellings phonetically on birth certificates. This led to individuals sometimes having their surname recorded with a different spelling from their father, and indeed there are many examples of individuals with their surname spelt differently from their birth and death certificates even in the 20th century. Whilst literacy rates amongst the general Irish population were low in the 17th, 18th and 19th centuries, such variant spellings were rarely questioned.

== Distribution ==
At present Poland (and its many variants) is considered a rare Gaelic surname throughout Ireland, as it is found almost exclusively in counties Armagh and Down; it is, however, also found with some concentration in County Offaly.

Occasionally the surname Poland, Pollane, Powland and Powlesland when found in English people with no Irish ancestry, the origin can be attributed to the village near the town of Odiham, in the county of Hampshire. The village called Poland has nothing whatsoever to do with the country of Poland. It is Olde English pre 7th century in origin, the derivation being from 'pol landa', meaning an area of agricultural land surrounded by lakes or pools, or possibly a place where 'poles' that is to say fencing poles were 'pollarded'. Most locational surnames were given to people after they left their original village and moved elsewhere. It was a simple form of identification. In England, surnames became necessary when governments introduced personal taxation. 'Paulin' also appears as a personal name in the Domesday Book.

== Persons with the surname ==
=== Poland ===
- Alfred Poland (1822–1872), British surgeon best known for the first account of the Poland syndrome
- Aodán Mac Póilin, Irish language activist in Northern Ireland
- Chris Poland (born 1957), American musician and vocalist, Megadeth
- Fred Poland, footballer
- Frederick Poland (1858–?1940), British-Canadian clergyman and cricketer
- George Poland (1913–1988), British footballer
- Harry Poland (1829–1928), British barrister
- Hugh Poland (baseball) (1910–1984), American baseball player, manager and scout
- Hugh Poland (politician) (1868–1938), New Zealand politician
- Kathryn Poland (1919–2010), American politician
- Mark Poland (fl. 2010s), Irish footballer
- Tom Poland (born 1949), American writer
- William Carey Poland (1846–1929), American classical scholar, university president

=== Polland ===
- David Polland (1915–?), American chess player
- Eddie Polland (born 1947), British golfer
- Milton Rice Polland (1909–2006), American businessman and political activist
- Pamela Polland (born 1944), American singer-songwriter
- Willie Polland (1934–2010), British footballer

== See also ==
- Polan (surname)
