= Poland (disambiguation) =

Poland is a country in Central Europe.

Poland may also refer to:

== Historical political entities ==
- Duchy of Poland (c. 960–1025), a duchy existing from around 960 to 1025
- Kingdom of Poland (1025–1031), a kingdom existing from 1025 to 1031
- Duchy of Poland (1031–1076), a duchy existing from 1031 to 1076
- Kingdom of Poland (1076–1079), a kingdom existing from 1076 to 1079
- Duchy of Poland (1079–1138), a duchy existing from 1079 to 1138
- Duchy of Poland (1138–1227), a confederal duchy existing from 1138 to 1227
- Kingdom of Poland (1295–1296), a kingdom in Greater Poland existing from 1295 to 1296, under the rule of Przemysł II
- Kingdom of Poland (1300–1320), a confederal duchy existing from 1300 to 1320
- United Kingdom of Poland, a kingdom existing from 1320 to 1386
- Crown of the Kingdom of Poland, a kingdom, that from 1385 to 1569 was an independent country, and from 1569 to 1795, was a member state of the Polish–Lithuanian Commonwealth
- Polish–Lithuanian Commonwealth, a federal-state existing from 1596 to 1795
- Congress Poland, a kingdom existing from 1815 to 1867/1915, under the control of Russian Empire
- Kingdom of Poland (1830–1831), a rebel state during the November Uprising, existing from 1830 to 1831
- Polish National Government (January Uprising), a rebel state during the January Uprising, existing from 1863 to 1865
- Kingdom of Poland (1917–1918), a client state of the German Empire existing from 1917 to 1918
- Second Polish Republic, a republic existing from 1918 to 1939
  - Polish government-in-exile, a government-in-exile of Poland, existing from 1939–1990
  - Polish Underground State, an underground state operating on the territories of the former Second Polish Republic during World War II
- Provisional Government of the Republic of Poland, a provisional government existing from 1944 to 1945
- Provisional Government of National Unity, a provisional government existing from 1945 to 1947
- Polish People's Republic, a satellite state of Soviet Union, existing from 1947 to 1989

== Places ==
=== Kiribati ===
- Poland, Kiribati

=== United States ===
- Poland, Indiana
- Poland, Maine
- Poland, Chautauqua County, New York
- Poland, Herkimer County, New York
- Poland, Ohio
- Poland Township, Mahoning County, Ohio
- Poland, Wisconsin

== Other uses ==
- Poland (album), a 1984 album by Tangerine Dream
- Poland (European Parliament constituency)
- Poland (novel), a 1983 novel by James A. Michener
- Poland (sculpture), a 1966 work by artist Mark di Suvero
- "Poland" (song), a 2022 song by Lil Yachty
- Poland (surname)
- Poland syndrome, a rare birth defect
- FV Poland, a French fishing trawler in service 1949–53

== See also ==
- History of Poland (1989–present)
- Polish (disambiguation)
