= Polian =

Poliçan, Perlikan, Polinian, Polanian, Pobolian, Polonian, Polian, Polyan, Polan may refer to:

- Polian Slavs, ancient East Slavic tribes:
  - Polans (eastern), living in the area of Dnieper river
  - Polans (western), living in the area of Warta. The tribe unified most of the lands of present-day Poland under the Piast dynasty.
- Polian (surname)
- Polyán, the Hungarian name for Poiana Sibiului Commune, Sibiu County, Romania

== See also ==
- Pollan (disambiguation)
- Polan (disambiguation)
