= Polan =

Polan may refer to:

- Polán, a municipality in the province of Toledo, Castile-La Mancha, Spain
- Polan (surname)
- Polan, Iran, a village in Sistan and Baluchestan Province, Iran
- Polan District, a district in Chah Bahar County, Sistan and Baluchestan Province, Iran
- Polan Rural District, a rural district in Sistan and Baluchestan Province, Iran

== See also ==
- Polans (disambiguation)
- Pollan (disambiguation)
- Polian (disambiguation)
- Poland (disambiguation)
