= Fiat 126 =

City car

Fiat 126 Polski Fiat 126p
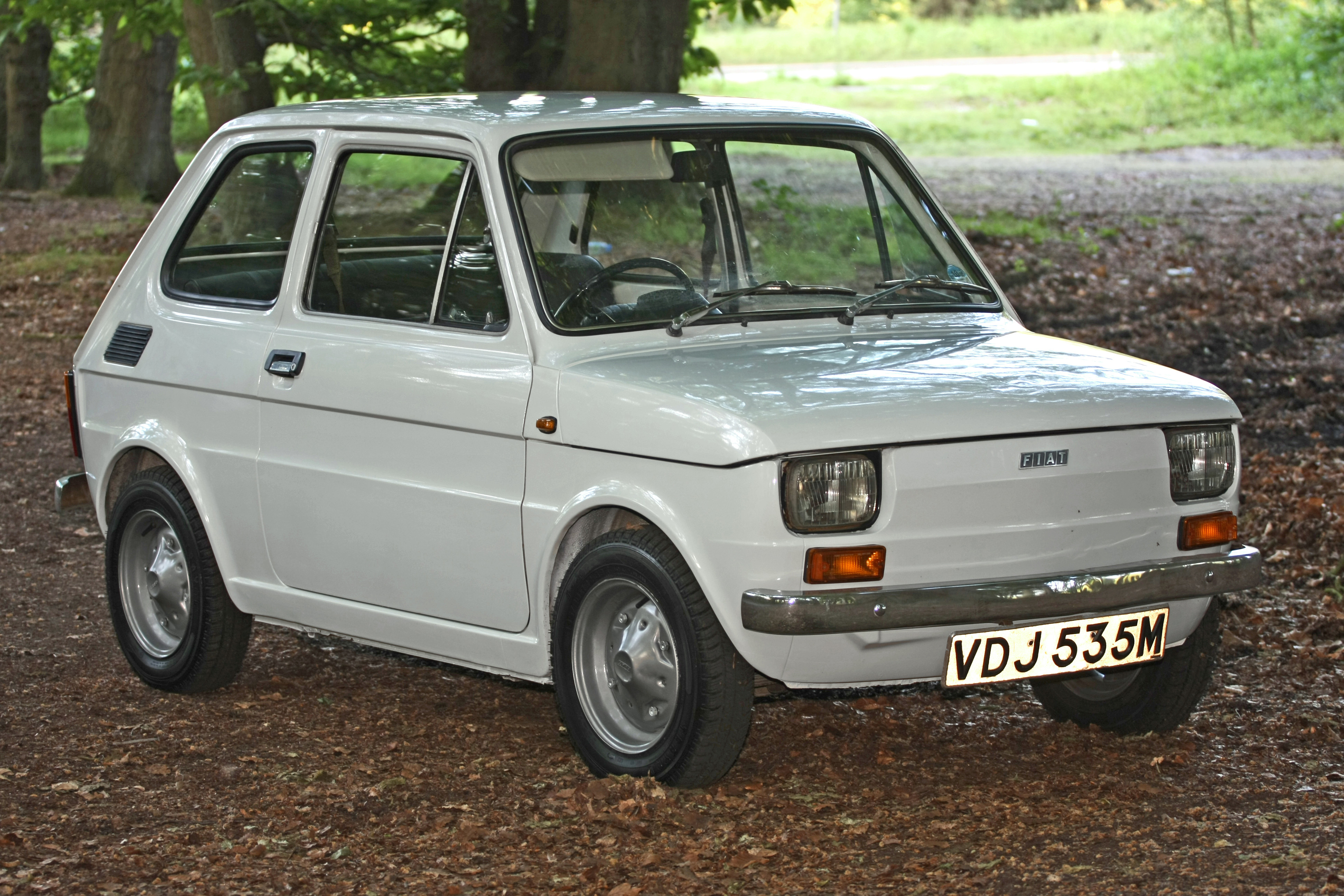

Overview
- Manufacturer: Fiat (1972–1980); FSM (Polski Fiat 126p, 1973–1992); Fiat Auto Poland (1992–2000)
- Also called: Fiat 126 Maluch (Poland); FSM Niki (Australia); Steyr Puch Fiat 126 (Austria); Zastava 126 (Yugoslavia)
- Production: 1972–2000; 4,673,655 units
- Assembly: Italy: Cassino; Italy: Termini Imerese; Poland: Bielsko-Biała (Polski Fiat); Poland: Tychy (Polski Fiat); Yugoslavia: Kragujevac (Zastava); Austria: Graz (Steyr Puch)
- Designer: Sergio Sartorelli

Body and chassis
- Class: City car (A)
- Body style: 2-door saloon 3-door hatchback (126 BIS)
- Layout: RR layout

Powertrain
- Engine: 594 cc R2; 652 cc R2; 704 cc R2
- Transmission: 4-speed manual

Dimensions
- Wheelbase: 1,840 mm (72.4 in)
- Length: 3,054 mm (120.2 in)
- Width: 1,378 mm (54.3 in)
- Height: 1,302 mm (51.3 in)
- Curb weight: 580–619 kg (1,279–1,365 lb)

Chronology
- Predecessor: Fiat 500
- Successor: Fiat Panda, Fiat Cinquecento

The Fiat 126 (Type 126) is a city car manufactured and marketed by Fiat from 1972 until 2000 over a single generation. It has a rear-engine design and seats four passengers. Introduced by Fiat in October 1972 at the Turin Auto Show, the 126 replaced the Fiat 500, using major elements from its design. A subsequent iteration, marketed as the 126 Bis, used a horizontally oriented, water-cooled engine, and featured a rear hatchback with additional cargo space.

The majority of 126s (some 3.3 million) were manufactured in Tychy and Bielsko-Biała plants, Poland and were marketed as the Polski Fiat 126p in many countries. Fiat stopped marketing the 126 in 1993 in favor of its new front-engined Cinquecento. Total production reached approximately 4.7 million units.

In Poland, the car became a people's car, and a cultural icon, earning the nickname Maluch, meaning "The Little One" or "Toddler", a name that eventually became official in 1997, when 'Maluch' badges appeared on the rear of the car.

In early 2020, the 28-year production run of the Fiat 126 was counted as the twenty-sixth most long-lived single-generation car in history by Autocar magazine.

== History ==
The 126 shared its wheelbase and much of the mechanical underpinnings and layout with the Fiat 500, featuring a revised, slightly larger bodyshell designed by Sergio Sartorelli with improved safety and interior space. The added interior space resulted from moving the starter from the top of the engine bellhousing to the side which permitted shifting the bulkhead/rear seat rearward approximately 10 cm, and the lengthening of the roof for rear-seat headroom.

The engine capacity was increased from 594 cc to 652 cc at the end of 1977 when the cylinder bore was increased from 73.5 to 77 mm. Claimed power output was unchanged at 23 hp (17 kW), but torque increased from 39 N⋅m (29 lb⋅ft) to 43 N⋅m (32 lb⋅ft). The 594 cc engines were still available in early 1983 production. The 652 cc engine was later also used in the Fiat Panda 30, but then positioned in the front and combined with front wheel drive.

A subsequent change in 1987 by FSM was the BIS version, produced until 1991. The 126 BIS gained a hatchback to access cargo space at the rear, made possible by replacing the air-cooled engine with a horizontally placed, water-cooled 704 cc 19 kW (26 hp) flat-twin.

The 126 was manufactured at Fiat's Cassino and Termini Imerese plants until 1979, with an overall production of 1,352,912 in Italy.

The 126 was also manufactured under license by Zastava in Yugoslavia. In Austria, it was briefly assembled by Steyr Puch as a successor to the successful Puch 500, with assembly of 2,069 cars through 1975. In Greece, there was an attempt to produce a small car named DIM whose technical layout was primarily based on the 126, but only ten were produced before the project was abandoned.

The 126 did not achieve the popularity of the 500 in Western Europe, as the rear-engined layout was made obsolete by better packaging and handling front-engine, front-wheel drive cars. The 126 became one of the last and longest-production rear-engine small cars manufactured in Europe, survived only by the VW Beetle whose production lasted until 1978 (2003, globally). The 126 was also the last rear-engine small car manufactured in Europe until the advent of the Smart Fortwo.

For a brief period in the early 1990s, a German company called POP also offered convertible versions of the 126 BIS. Two models were offered: a basic one called the "POP 650" and a more luxurious model called the "POP 2000".

== Polski Fiat 126p ==
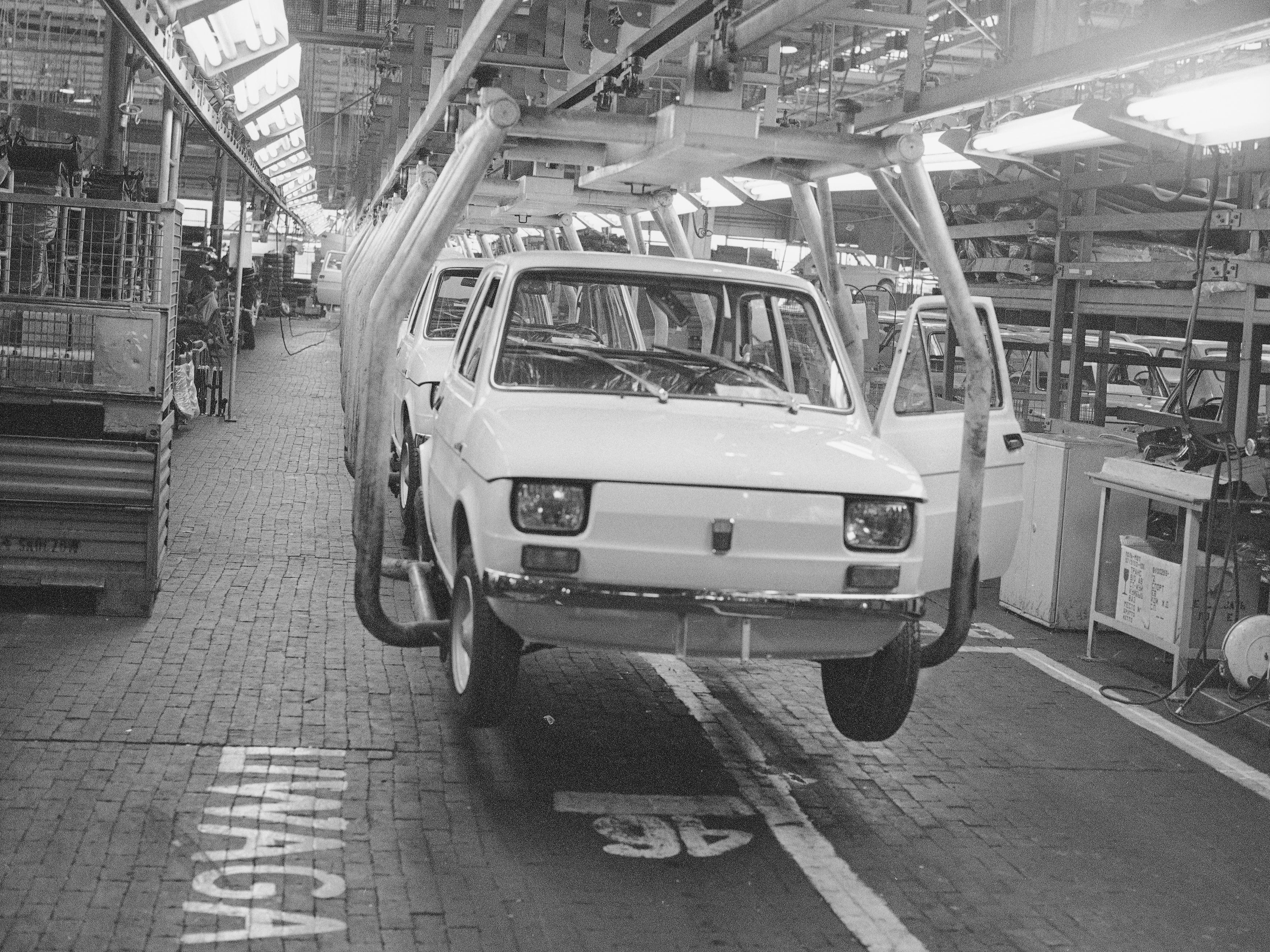
Construction of "Maluch" in the FSM factory in Bielsko-Biała, 1970s

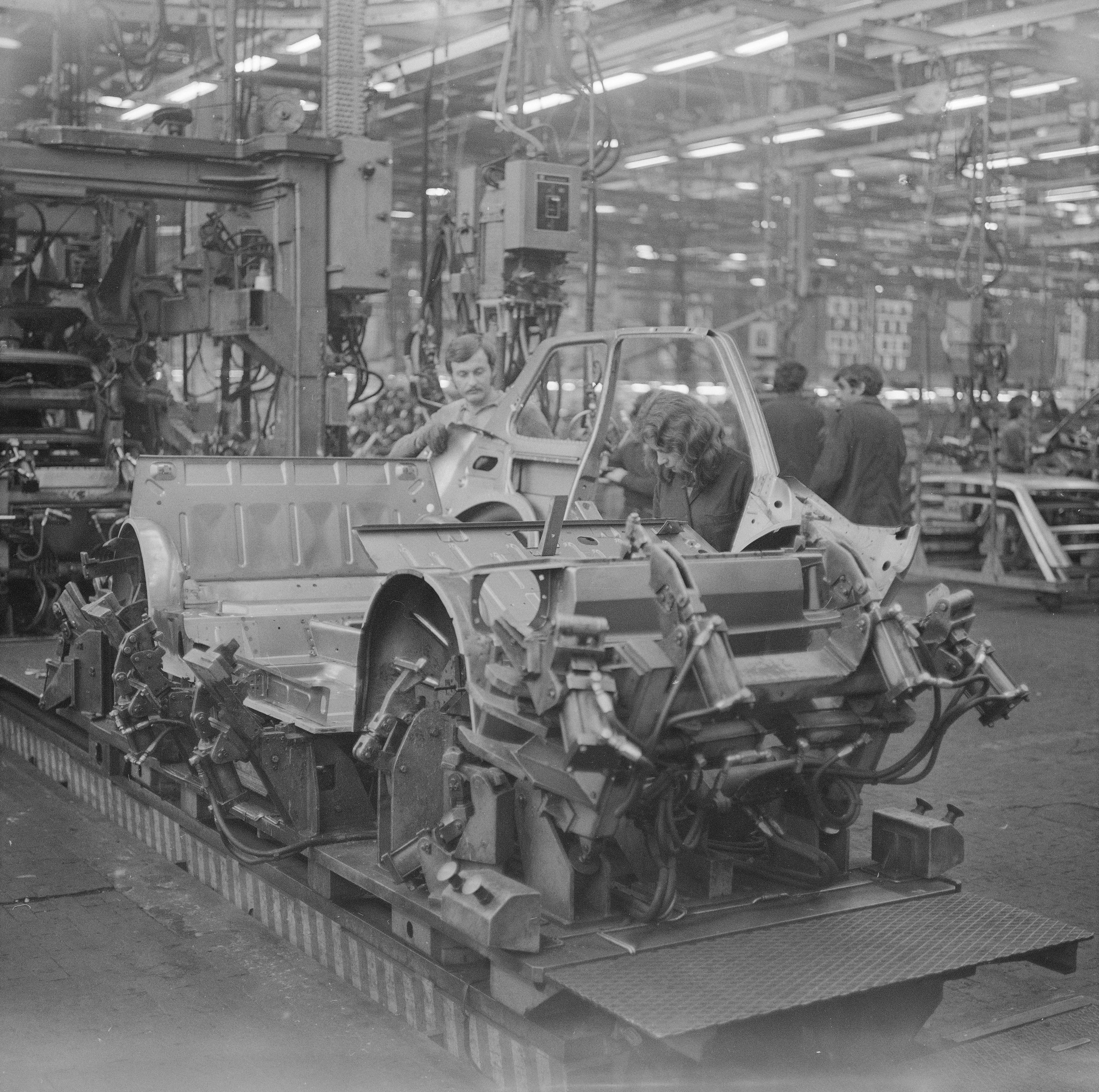
Construction of "Maluch" in the FSM factory in Bielsko-Biała, 1970s

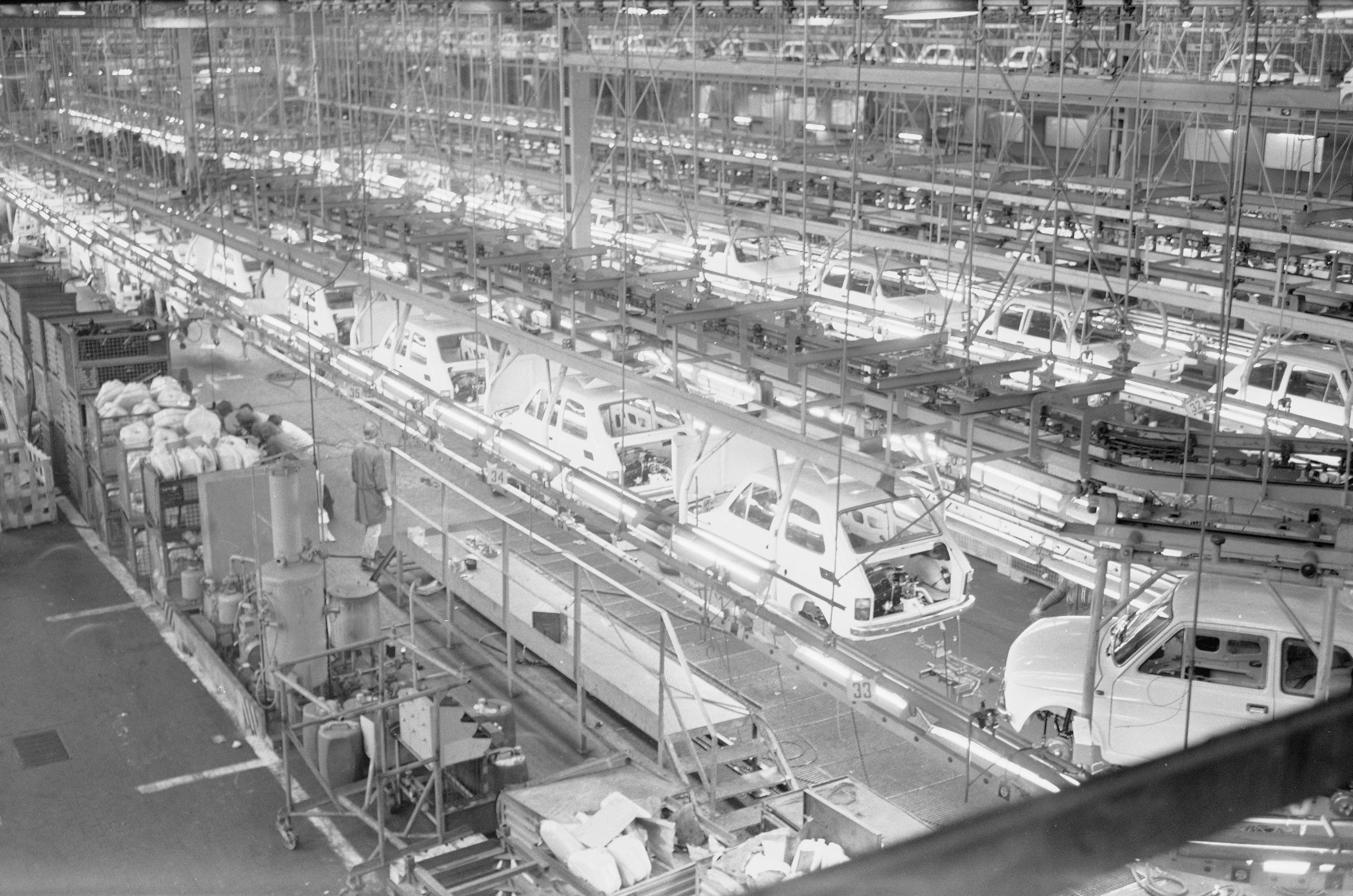
Construction of "Maluch" in the FSM factory in Bielsko-Biała, 1970s

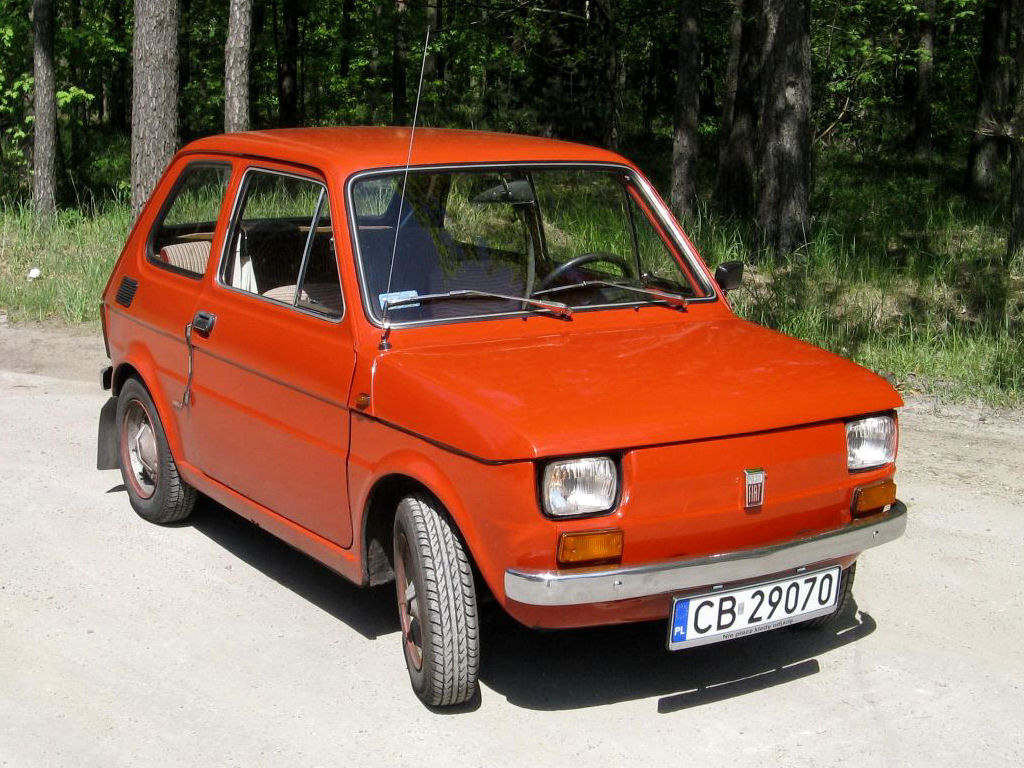
1973 Polski Fiat 126p (Poland)

In Poland, the car was produced under license by Fabryka Samochodów Małolitrażowych (FSM) (En: Small-Displacement Car Factory) in Bielsko-Biała and Tychy under the brand Polski Fiat 126p (literally in English: Polish Fiat 126p) between 1973 and 2000.

Due to its relatively low price, it was prevalent in Poland and was arguably the most common Polish car in the 1980s. Its tiny size gave it the nickname maluch ("the small one", "small child", "little guy", pronounced [ˈmalux]). The nickname became so popular that in 1997, it was accepted by the manufacturer as the car's official name.

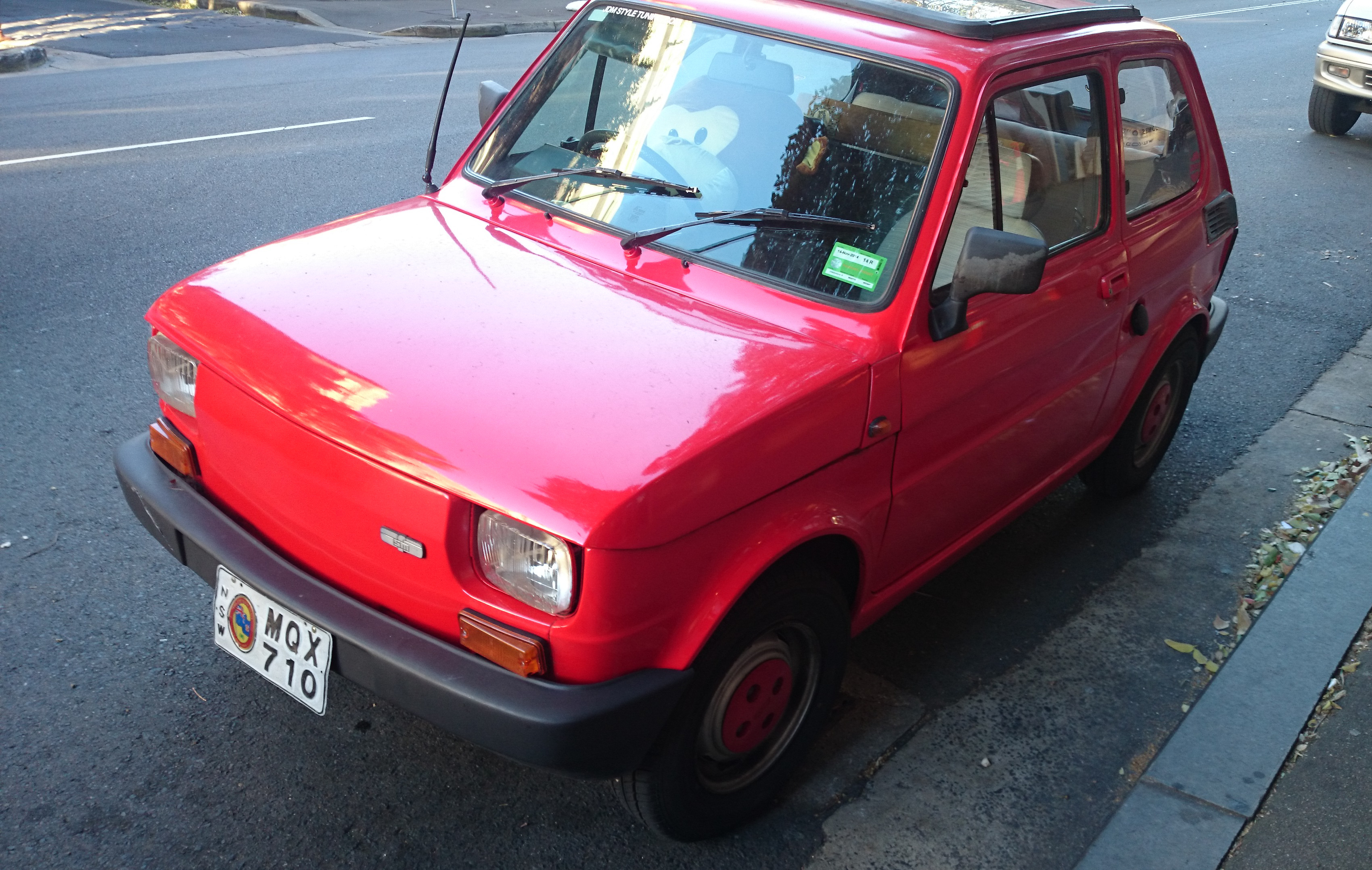
A 126 in Australia, sold locally as the FSM Niki

At first, it was almost identical to the basic model: differences included a higher chassis, a modified grille on the back, and the front indicator lenses that were clear white in Italy, but orange in other markets. The letter "p" was added to its name to distinguish it from the original Italian car.

Throughout the 1980s, the 126p was continuously modified. First, it received upgraded brakes and new wheels from Italian Fiat. Hazard warning lights were added to meet new lighting requirements.

In 1984, the 126 received a facelift, giving it plastic bumpers (for all versions) and a new dashboard. This model was named the Fiat 126p FL. In 1985, a single rear fog light and reversing light (on opposite sides) were incorporated into the rear bumper. Also electronic ignition was added, and an alternator replaced the undersized generator around 1987. In 1994, the 126p received another facelift and some parts from the Fiat Cinquecento; this version was named 126 EL. The 126 ELX introduced a catalytic converter.

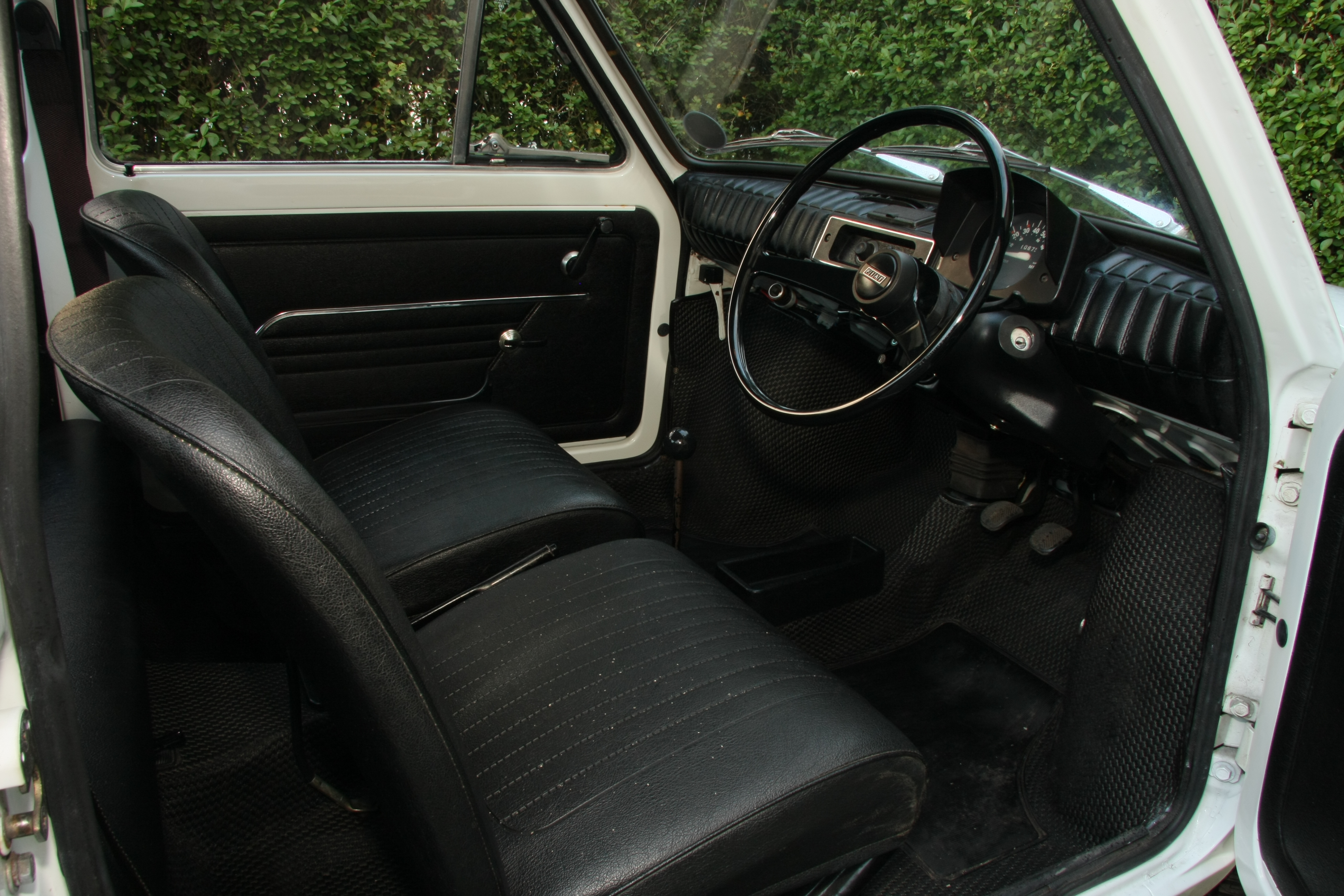
1973 Fiat 126 interior

In 1987, production of the 126 BIS began, featuring a water-cooled 704 cc engine of Polish construction. Nevertheless, production of the original model continued for the Polish market. The 126 BIS used some parts from the Fiat Cinquecento.

The factory battery in the 126p had a 35-amp hour capacity. Due to the undersized generator, it would only be fully charged if the car was driven for an extended time. Upgrading with the 45-amp hour battery from the Fiat 125p (1.5 Litre engine) improved the cold start reliability.

The 126p was exported to many Eastern Bloc countries, and for several years, it was one of the most popular cars in Poland and in Hungary as well. It also found a minor market in Australia between 1989 and 1992 under the name FSM Niki. During that period, it was Australia's cheapest car. There was a convertible version developed for the Australian market. It was also successful in Cuba where it was one of the best-selling cars of its time and an estimated 10,000 were still registered by 2016.

The 126p also has a history in China: In the early 1980s, it became one of the first passenger cars to be imported to the country. The government initially bought 10,000, mainly used as taxis, but later, the 126p became available for private buyers – a rarity in the country then. In the 1980s, it was one of the best-selling cars in China, selling around 30,000 units per year.

Throughout the 1970s and 1980s, several experimental prototypes were developed in Poland. A cargo version was designed in 1974 called "Bombel" (literally "bubble", but also a colloquial term for "small child") because of its fiberglass bubble-shaped cargo area; an off-road version propelled by caterpillar tracks and a front-wheel drive, front-engined model, with a longer front end and a flat cargo area in the rear where the original 126 had its engine. The rear of this prototype was similar to the 126 Bis which also had a rear hatch for accessing a cargo space created by mounting its flat water-cooled engine under the floor.

There was also an attempt at installing a small diesel engine (due to gasoline rationing) in the classic 126p body. It is also a popular platform for electric motor and motorcycle engine swaps.

=== Timeline of PF 126p ===
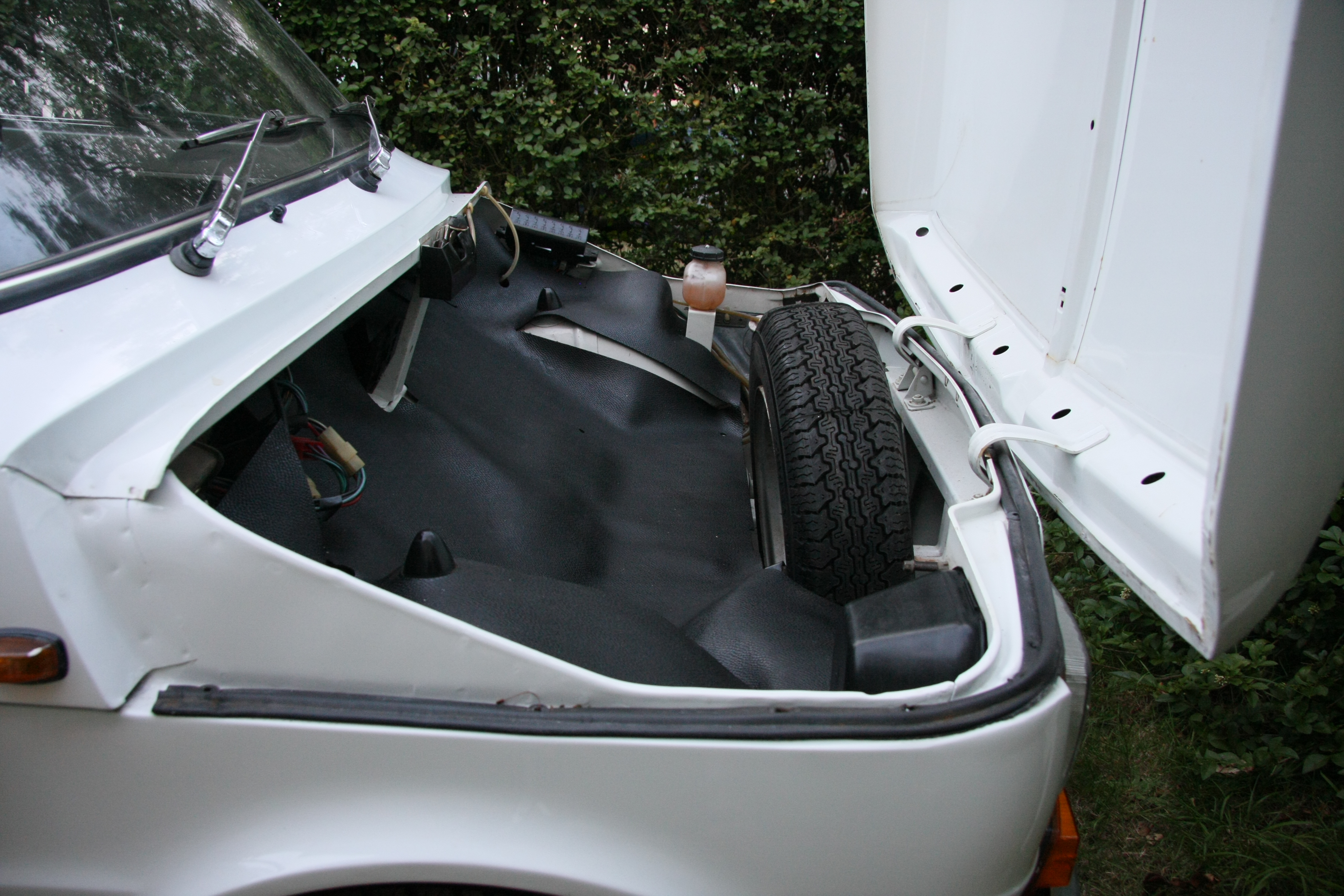
The front footwells, suspension, battery and spare wheel left little room for luggage in the front storage compartment.

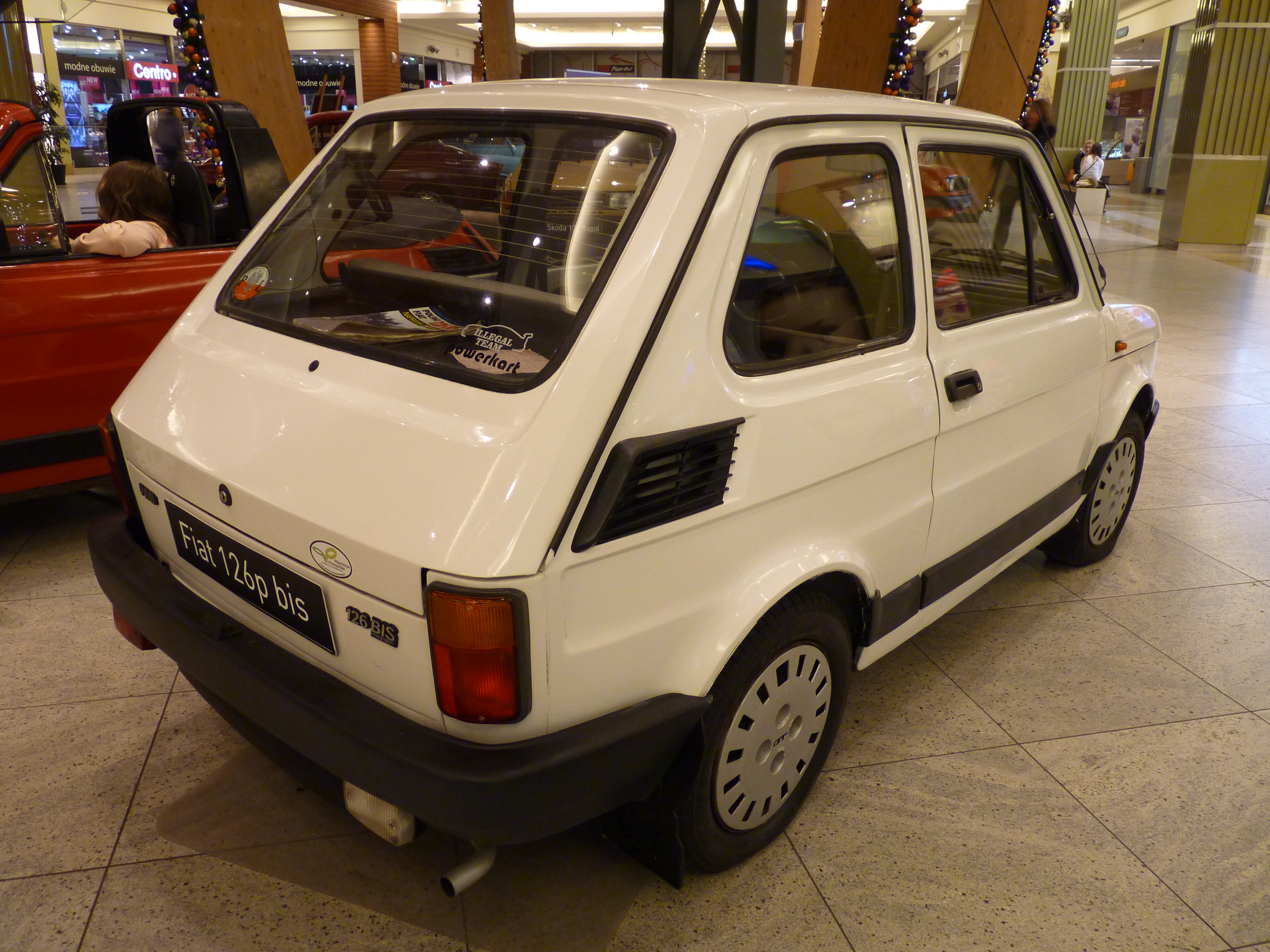
From 1987, the 126 became available as a hatchback even though the engine is in the rear.

- 1972 – The FSM car factory was built in Bielsko-Biała.
- 6 June 1973 – The first Polski Fiat 126p constructed from Italian parts. The official price was 69,000 Polish złotys with PKO Bank Polski accepting pre-payments on savings books starting 5 February 1973.
- 22 July 1973 – The official opening of the factory's production line. By the end of that year, over 1,500 Fiats were manufactured.
- September 1975 – Production started in the Tychy factory.
- 1977 – Engine capacity increased from 594 cc to 652 cc. Engine power increased to about 24 horsepower (18 kW).
- 1978 – Production of types with engine capacity 594 cc ended.
- 1979 – Production of Polski Fiat 126p continued only in Bielsko-Biała.
- 1981 – The millionth Polski Fiat 126p was produced.
- December 1984 – Technical changes in the construction and body. Type FL introduced.
- 1987 – Production begins of a water-cooled Polski Fiat 126p Bis version – a three-door hatchback with 704 cc capacity.
- May 1993 – The three millionth Polish Fiat 126p was produced.
- September 1994 – Body improvement, creating type "el" with parts similar to those used in Fiat Cinquecento.
- January 1997 – Introduction of a catalytic converter.
- 22 September 2000 – Production ended after a production run of 3,318,674 units. All Fiats of the last limited Happy End series were yellow or red (500 cars in red and 500 cars in yellow).

The car's global production was 4,673,655 units: 1,352,912 in Italy, 2,069 in Austria by Fiat-Steyr, and 3,318,674 in Poland.

=== Political connotations ===
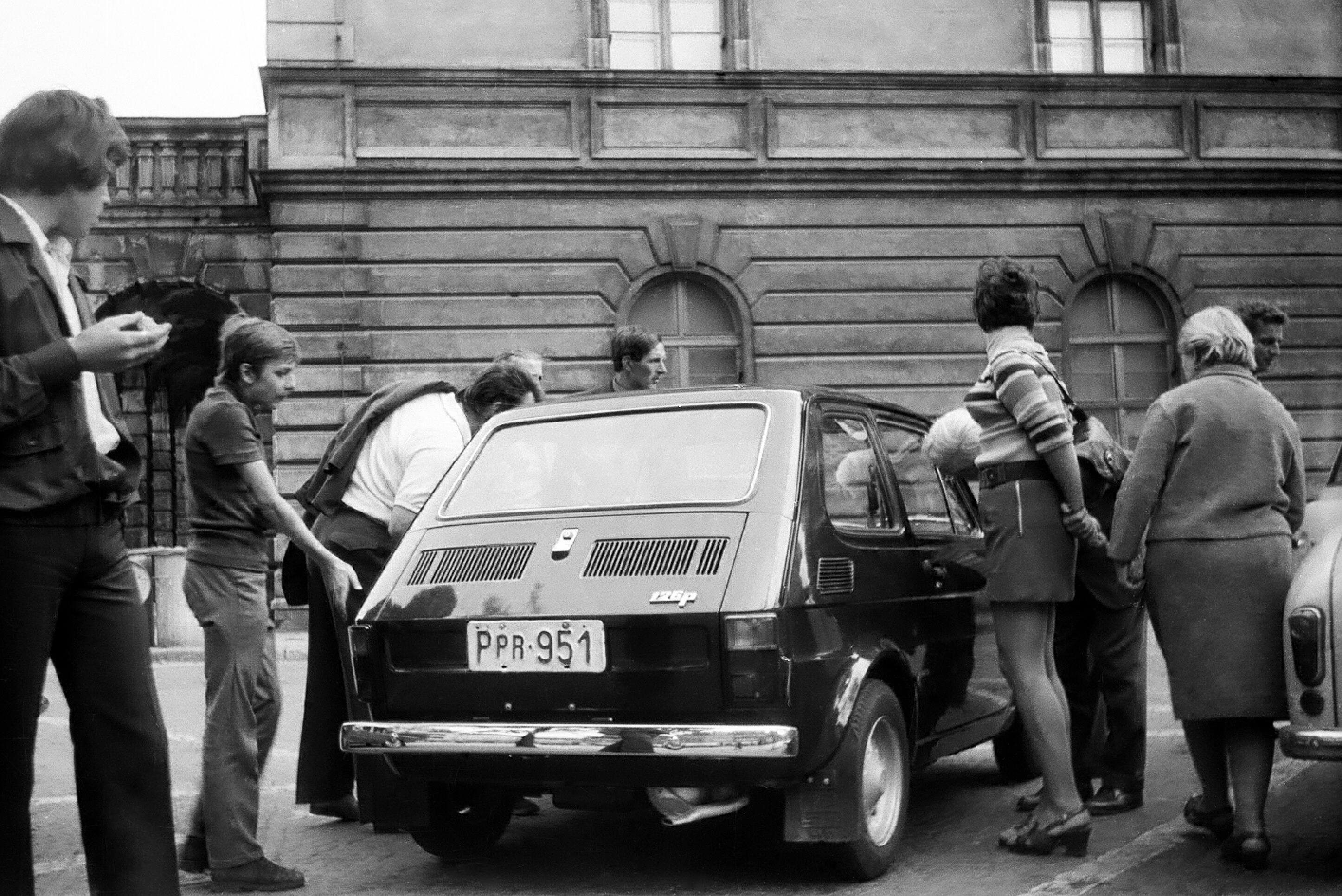
A Fiat 126p in Poland, 1973, attracting the curiosity of passers-by

The PF 126p has a special meaning for Poles, and its story is connected to Polish politics during the communist period (Polish People's Republic, up to 1989). During the absolute rule of the PZPR, a private car was considered a luxury item due to limited availability and low salaries. In 1971, there were only 556,000 passenger cars in Poland. In a top-down planned economy, decisions on whether a state-owned factory could produce a car were taken on political and not just economic grounds. The authorities themselves initially did not find the idea of private cars attractive. The first relatively cheap Polish car was the Syrena, but it needed to be updated, and its production was low. Limited numbers of cars were also imported from other Eastern Bloc countries. It was challenging to buy a Western car because the Polish złoty, like other currencies in communist states, was not convertible to Western funds, and the country had no free market.

Thus, the PF 126p was intended to be the first real, popular, and affordable car to provide mobility for ordinary families. The license was bought after the rise to power of a new PZPR leader, Edward Gierek, who wanted to gain popularity by increasing consumer spending after the austerity period under Władysław Gomułka. Even though it was a tiny city car, it was the only choice for most families, filling the role of a family car. During holidays, it was common to see families of four driving PF-126s abroad with huge suitcases on a roof rack; sightings of PF-126s towing a small Niewiadów N126 caravan especially designed for the PF 126 were also occasionally reported. PF 126p production, however, was not sufficient and the PF 126p was on sale with a waiting list. Usually, families had to wait a few years to buy a car. The authorities could also give a coupon to purchase a car based on merit or relationship.

== Nicknames ==
In Polish, it is called Maluch, which literally means "small one" or toddler (and was an official name since 1997), as well as mały Fiat ("small Fiat"), in contrast to Fiat 125p, called duży Fiat ("big Fiat"). In some regions, it is also called Kaszlak, literally "cougher" (derived from kaszel, "cough", as its engine's sound resembles a cough when it is started).

In Albanian, it is known as Kikirez, meaning a "little rooster".

In Serbo-Croatian, it is known as Peglica (meaning "little iron"), or, occasionally, as "klompa" (meaning "clog")

In Slovene, the 126 is also called Bolha ("flea"), Piči-poki (loosely translated as "fast-and-loud") or Kalimero on Slovenian coast after a cartoon character Calimero.

In Hungarian, it is known as kispolszki ("Little Polish", while the 125p is the nagypolszki, meaning "Big Polish"), kispolák ("Little Pole") or kispók ("Little spider"); also, the car was nicknamed egérkamion, meaning "mouse truck".

In German, the Fiat 126 was known as the Bambino, the Italian word for child.

In Chilean Spanish, it is known as Bototo and in Cuban Spanish as the Polqi or Polaquito, meaning "Little Pole" or "Little Polish man", and thanks to Cuban inventiveness there are some of them with Daewoo Tico, Subaru Vivio and even Lada 2107 engines swapped.

== Bibliography ==
- Klimecki, Zbigniew; Podolak, Roman (1982). Polski FIAT 126P: technika jazdy, obsługa i usprawnienia (in Polish). Wydawnictwa Komunikacji i Łączności. ISBN 978-83-206-0092-6.
- Sowa, Aleksander (2008). Fiat 126p Mały Wielki Samochód (in Polish). Złot Myśli. ISBN 978-83-7582-550-3.
- Zakrzewski, Adam (2011). PRL. Auto-Moto. Władcy dróg i poboczy (in Polish). Warsaw, Poland: Demart. ISBN 978-83-74-27-484-5. Archived from the original on 26 January 2012.
