= Polish =

Polish /ˈpoʊlɪʃ/ may refer to:

- Anything from or related to Poland, a country in Europe
- Polish language
- Polish people, people from Poland or of Polish descent
- Polish chicken
- Polish brothers (Mark Polish and Michael Polish, born 1970), American twin screenwriters
- Kevin Polish, an American Paralympian archer

Polish /ˈpɒlɪʃ/ may refer to:

- Polishing, the process of creating a smooth and shiny surface by rubbing or chemical action
  - French polishing, polishing wood to a high gloss finish
  - Polishing (metalworking)
- Nail polish
- Shoe polish
- Polish (screenwriting), improving a script in smaller ways than in a rewrite
- "Polish", a song from the Twice album &Twice

== See also ==
- Polishchuk (surname)
- Polonaise (disambiguation)
- Polski Fiat
