= Polans =

Polans may refer to two Slavic tribes:

- Polans (eastern), an East Slavic tribe which inhabited both sides of the Dnieper river from the 6th to the 9th century
- Polans (western), a West Slavic tribe in the area of Warta, which unified most of the lands of present-day Poland under the Piast dynasty

== See also ==
- Polan (disambiguation)
- Opolans, a West Slavic tribe that lived in the region of upper Odra
