= Fiat 125 =

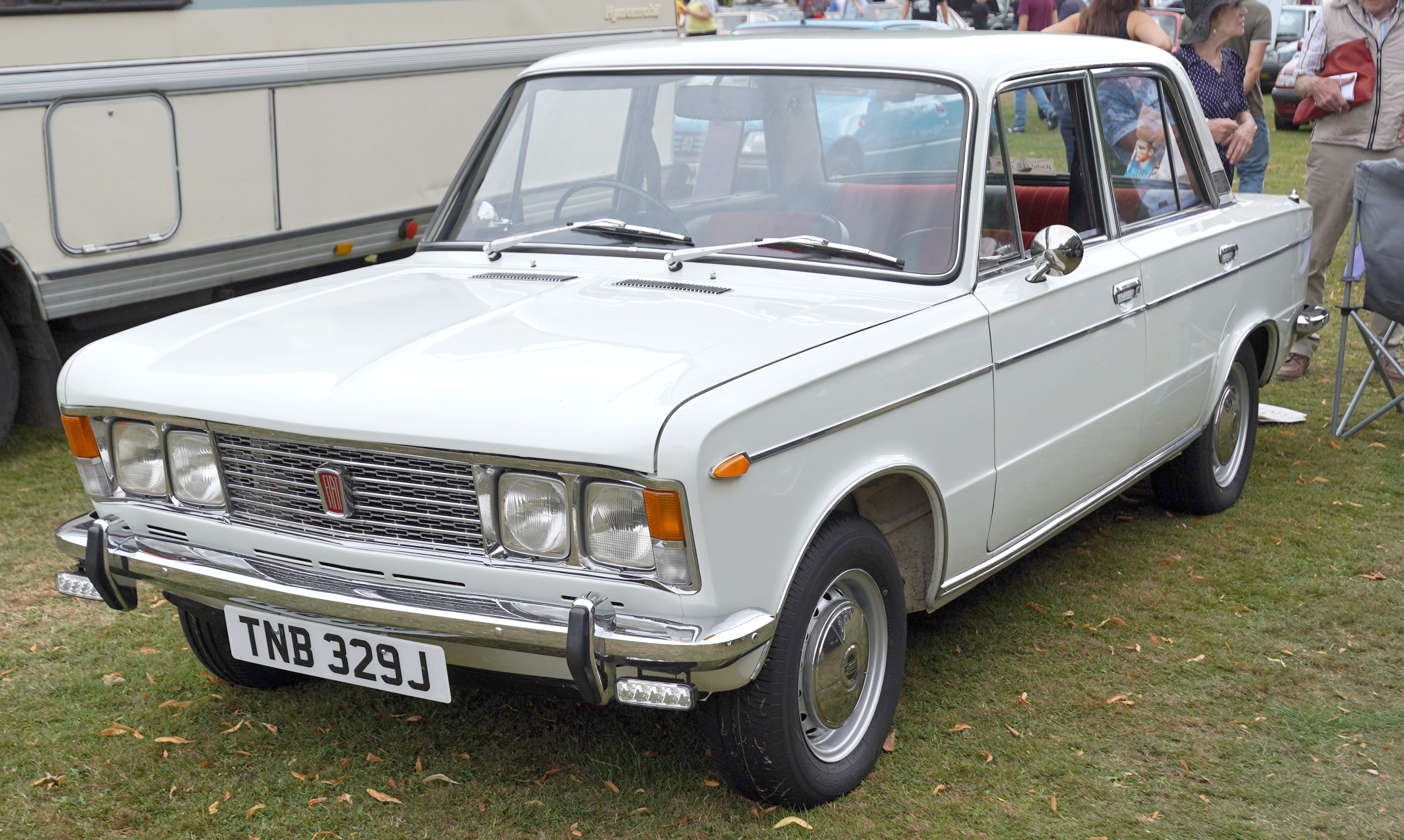
- Fiat 125 Special

Overview
- Manufacturer: Fiat
- Production: 1967–1972; 1972–1982 (Argentina)
- Assembly: Italy: Comprensorio di Mirafiori, Turin; Argentina: Córdoba; Chile: Rancagua; Indonesia: Jakarta (until 1986); Morocco: Casablanca (SOMACA)

Body and chassis
- Class: Large family car (D)
- Body style: 4-door saloon 5-door estate 2-door coupé utility (Argentina)
- Related: Fiat 124; Zastava 125pz Polski Fiat 125p

Powertrain
- Engine: 1608 cc DOHC I4
- Transmission: 4-speed manual (125: 1967–1973); 5-speed manual (125S: 1968–1970, 125 Special 1970–1973); 3-speed automatic (125 Special: 1970–1973)

Dimensions
- Wheelbase: 2,505 mm (98.6 in)
- Length: 4,232 mm (166.6 in)
- Width: 1,625 mm (64.0 in)
- Height: 1,420 mm (55.9 in)
- Curb weight: 1,055 kg (2,325.9 lb)

Chronology
- Predecessor: Fiat 1500
- Successor: Fiat 132

The Fiat 125 is a large family car manufactured and marketed by Italian company Fiat from 1967 to 1972. Derivatives were built under license outside Italy until the 1990s. As launched the car was unusual in blending saloon car passenger accommodation with sports car performance, a combination which would be more widely adopted by the European volume auto-makers in the decade ahead.

== Development and history ==
In the mid-1960s, Fiat's mid-size models, the 1500 and 1800, were becoming outdated, while their intended replacement, the Project 132, was still at an early stage of development.

As an interim solution, engineer Dante Giacosa proposed combining existing components to create a new model. The design used the platform of the Fiat 1500, the central body structure of the Fiat 124, and newly designed front and rear sections. It also incorporated an updated version of the twin-cam engine from the Fiat 124 Sport. Eighteen months later the resulting model was the Fiat 125, introduced at the 1967 Geneva Motor Show.

The Fiat 125 was powered by a 1,608 cc inline-four engine with a square configuration, derived by increasing the stroke from 71.5 mm to 80 mm. In its initial version, the engine produced approximately 90 horsepower but achieved at 5600 rpm instead of the 6500 rpm of the 1,438 cc version. This improved torque distribution and smoothness of delivery. The technical package was completed by the four disc brakes, vacuum brake servo, and the four-speed, all-synchronized gearbox equipped with Porsche-type synchronizers, which gave excellent results in terms of handling. The gear ratios were designed with intensive use in mind, even on the highway. The top speed in third gear was 125 km/h compared to around 100 km/h for the 1500 C.

The car, using existing components, was rapidly developed and the first prototypes began to be tested as early as the winter of 1966. The suspension layout followed that of its predecessor, with slightly wider tracks. The rear suspension, derived from the Fiat Dino and later used for the 131, 132, and Argenta models, consists of a rigid axle that remained essentially the same as the 1500 C, but the anti-roll bar present on its predecessor was removed, replaced by a pair of longitudinal rods connecting the axle to the floorpan, used to improve steering precision. Fiat emphasized this detail in the brochures for the various versions of the car, referring to a so-called "wishbone layout."

The Fiat 125 was officially shown in May 1967, three months ahead of schedule. The car was immediately well received by both the public and critics. The interior, spacious and fitted with high-quality materials, and the bodywork, which had been expertly retouched to enhance its "prominence", were a hit with the public. It was one of the few cars in its class with a passenger compartment free of exposed sheet metal. After many years of "absence," the 125 marked the return of the circular instrumentation. Customers also appreciated the model's brilliant performance and overall robustness, although they lamented the lack of a fifth gear unlike its "rival," the Giulia Super. The 125 was one of the very first cars to feature intermittent windshield wipers as standard. From late 1967, an electronic rev counter was available as an option only. Other options available on request for the new Turin sedan are the anti-theft "steering lock", the white sidewall tires, the car radio and the semi-automatic "Idroconvert" transmission (which works in a similar way to the one already offered on the "850").

=== 125 S and performance development ===
The car's chassis was well regarded, but demand for higher performance led to the introduction of a more powerful version, the Fiat 125 S. This variant featured an additional 10 horsepower, achieved through mechanical refinements influenced by the Fiat 124 Sport engine, along with dual carburettors. It also offered upgraded equipment and trim, with optional features such as Cromodora alloy wheels, tinted glass, and a more luxurious interior including seats with a fabric central band, a new central console with storage compartments, a dashboard without the fake wood, a new heating system and optional air conditioning and a new floor covering with improved soundproofing.

Other updates to the 125 S included the adoption of dual braking circuits, one circuit for the front and one for the rear, mechanical brake level corrector with the braking power at the rear being measured to prevent excessive unloading of the rear suspension when slowing, as well as a different brake pedal force calibration. Completing the package were a new steering box, derived from that of the Fiat Dino Coupé, new iodine headlights, and the adoption of radial-ply tires as standard.

The interior rearview mirror was also modified, with a new attachment that could be released in the event of a crash and new courtesy lights and speaker mounting brackets were added to the rear seats. Several plastic parts in the passenger compartment, such as the door pillar and front seat seals, benefited from improved finishing. The last production models of the standard 125 were also equipped with dual-circuit braking. The trunk capacity was slightly reduced, from 400 to 380 dm³, due to the adoption of the new 50-liter fuel tank instead of 45.

The improved performance brought the Fiat 125 S close to the level of the Alfa Romeo Giulia, prompting competitive responses within the segment. The model was also well received in markets such as Germany, where it competed with vehicles like the BMW 1600 and 1600 TI.

==== Facelift and production end ====
In 1970, the Fiat 125 received a minor update presented at the Turin Motor Show. The base version remained largely unchanged, while the higher-performance 125 S was renamed the 125 Special. This version featured styling updates, including revised headlights, grille, wheel covers, and interior refinements. From 1970 onwards, the Special adopted a steering column with an articulated and divided into three parts, which in the event of a head-on collision prevented the steering wheel from dangerously recoiling towards the driver.

Production continued with steady commercial and sporting success until 1972, when Fiat introduced the Fiat 132 as its replacement and discontinued the 125. The decision led to mixed reactions among customers, and enthusiast clubs were later formed in Italy to preserve the model’s legacy.

Years later, Fiat chairman Gianni Agnelli reportedly acknowledged that discontinuing the model had been premature.

== The body ==
The chassis used was the same as that of the longer variant of the outgoing model, the 1300/1500, and the floor pan was virtually unchanged from it. The body was a slightly lengthened development of the Fiat 124: the two models had the same passenger compartment and doors, but the 125's rear seat was set slightly further back, reflecting the longer wheelbase, 85 mm (3.3 in) longer than that of the 124, inherited from the Fiat 1500 C.

== Engine and running gear ==
The new car's engine was based on the 1.4L Fiat Twin Cam unit, designed by Aurelio Lampredi, that was fitted in the Fiat 124 Sport, but now in a 1608 cc version with 90 PS (66 kW; 89 bhp) driving the rear wheels. The 125 was equipped with a Weber 34 DCHE 20 or Solex 34 PIA carburetor. The car was fitted with an alternator, reflecting the twin headlights and the increasing number of energy intensive electrical components appearing on cars at this time. Other noteworthy features included the electromagnetic cooling fan clutch which was prone to failure and was replaced with a normal cooling fan system.

A four-speed manual was standard for all 125 models built from '67 through '72, while the S and Special versions had the five-speed manual as standard. The Special could be optioned with a three-speed GM TH300 (Trimatic) transmission.

Available for the 125 between '68 and '69 was a Idroconvert four-speed gearbox which was a semi automatic gearbox along the same lines as a 'Sportomatic' Porsche. The clutch is electric and is actuated by a switch on the top of the shifter, which means that the car can start in first, second, third or fourth gear and when you stop on a red traffic light you can keep the car in gear with your foot on the brake and the engine will idle. When you want to go again you just press on the accelerator like in a "normal" automatic car. While you are in fourth gear, if you would like to pass a car, you can downshift in to third or even second gear, just using the shifter lever. A very rare option, with very few units having been built and an option that is not featured neither in the driver's manual or the shop manual of this model, with only a couple of period auto magazine articles attesting to its existence.

== Developments ==
The 125 featured one of the world's first intermittent wipers and was praised when new for its handling and dynamics. British Autocar found the slight understeer tendencies were easily cured by adjusting the front camber.

In 1968 the 125S was added to the range, with 100 PS (74 kW; 99 bhp) (from a modified cylinder head, camshafts, inlet/outlet manifold and Weber/Solex carburetor) and, unusually at this time, a five-speed gearbox. It also had halogen lights, servo-assisted twin circuit brakes and optional superlight magnesium wheels. A variety of other improvements were made including improved cabin ventilation, trim and styling. The S had black leather dash trim instead of faux wood and a different style center console which was made to accommodate the new five-speed location. The S body differentiates from the standard version by being slightly shorter and slightly wider.

The Special received a facelift late 1970, using pretty much the same trim as the 125S, but the visual width of the car was enhanced by a wider grille (the indicators moved from the side to the bumper) and by replacing the square rear lights with larger, horizontal ones. The interior gained upgraded upholstery of the seats and a wood facia. A three-speed GM automatic transmission as well as air conditioning, sunroof and rear window defroster became available as an option.

== Variations ==
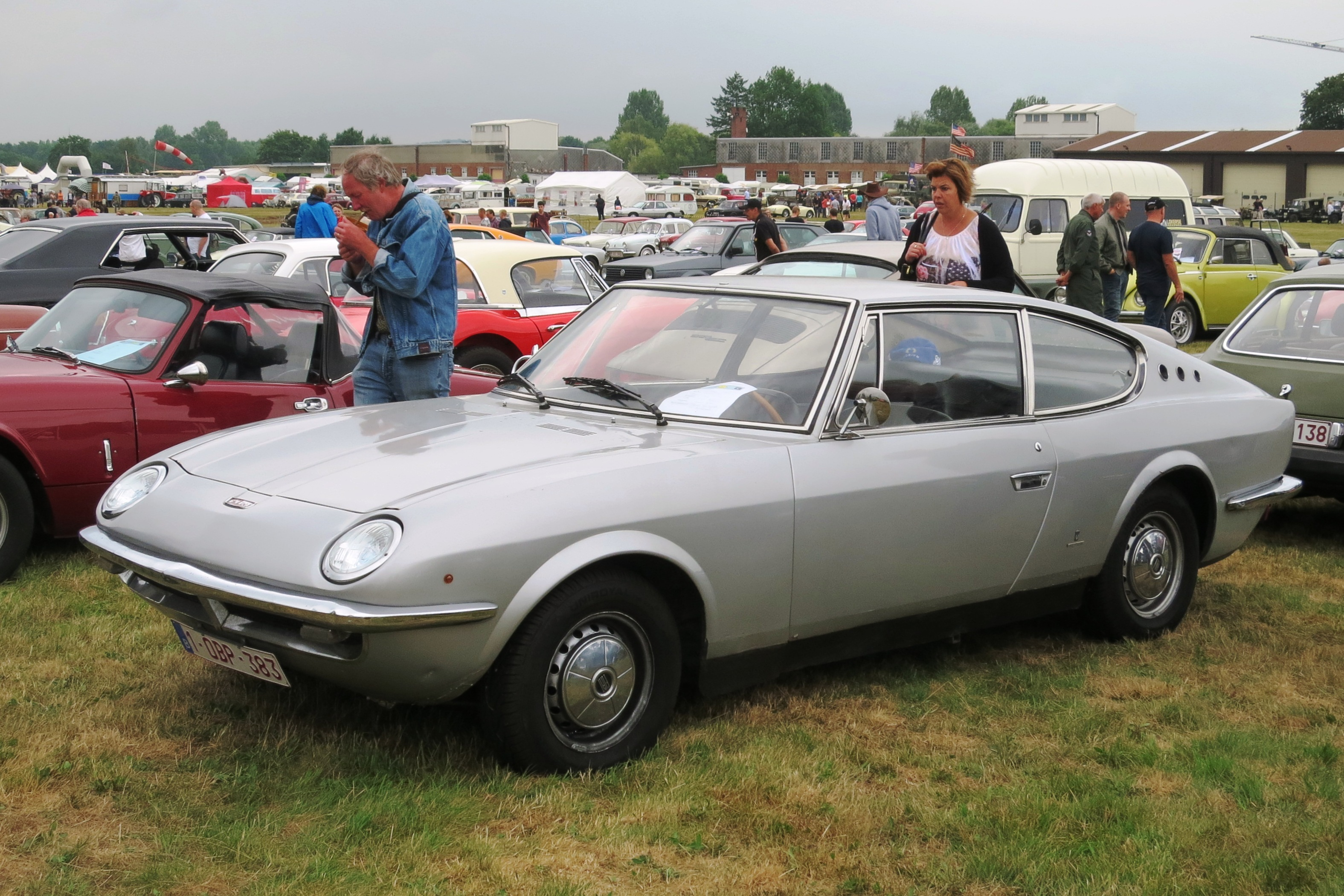
Front right view of the Samantha.

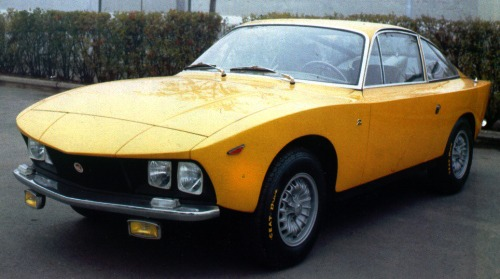
The 1967 Fiat 125 GTZ, one-off made by Zagato.

A variant, the 125 T, was made by the Fiat importers in New Zealand, Torino Motors, for the annual 6 hour production car race, the Benson and Hedges 500. The 125T has larger valves, two twin Weber DCOH or Dell'Orto 40DHLA carburetors (depending on availability), modified camshafts and a higher compression ratio to produce around 125 bhp (93 kW), lowered and stiffer suspension. All featured Ward alloy wheels and were painted bright yellow. Sources for production figures quote that between 84 and 89 were modified. Reasons for stopping production are sometimes given that Fiat headquarters found out and stopped this venture. However a more likely scenario is that selling the required 200 cars in a market that only sold 1,000 Fiats in total each year was a tall order.

In South Africa the Fiat 125 OTS Scorpion was built by local tuner Alconi Scorpion of Pretoria, based on the chassis of the base Italian sedan. It had a 1608 cc engine with power increased to 125 DIN hp (at 6,300 rpm) thanks to new camshafts, two twin-choke Weber 40 DCOE carburetors, and new intake and exhaust manifolds. The top speed was claimed to be 172 km/h and it accelerated from a standing start to 400 m in 16.1 seconds. The transmission had only 4 gears. The steering column was also lowered for a sportier driving position. The company offered the option of further modifications to reach power outputs of up to 190 DIN hp for track use.

Other versions were built by Moretti, who made the 125GS 1.6 with styling similar to the Fiat Dino Spider. Zagato made the 125 GTZ; Savio, a 125 Coupé and 125 Station Wagon; Bertone, a 125 Executive to a Marcello Gandini design; and Vignale produced the Samantha, a two-door coupé with pop-up headlights, designed by Virginio Vairo. Another 125 Station Wagon was built by OSI to a Sergio Sartorelli design.

== Production ==
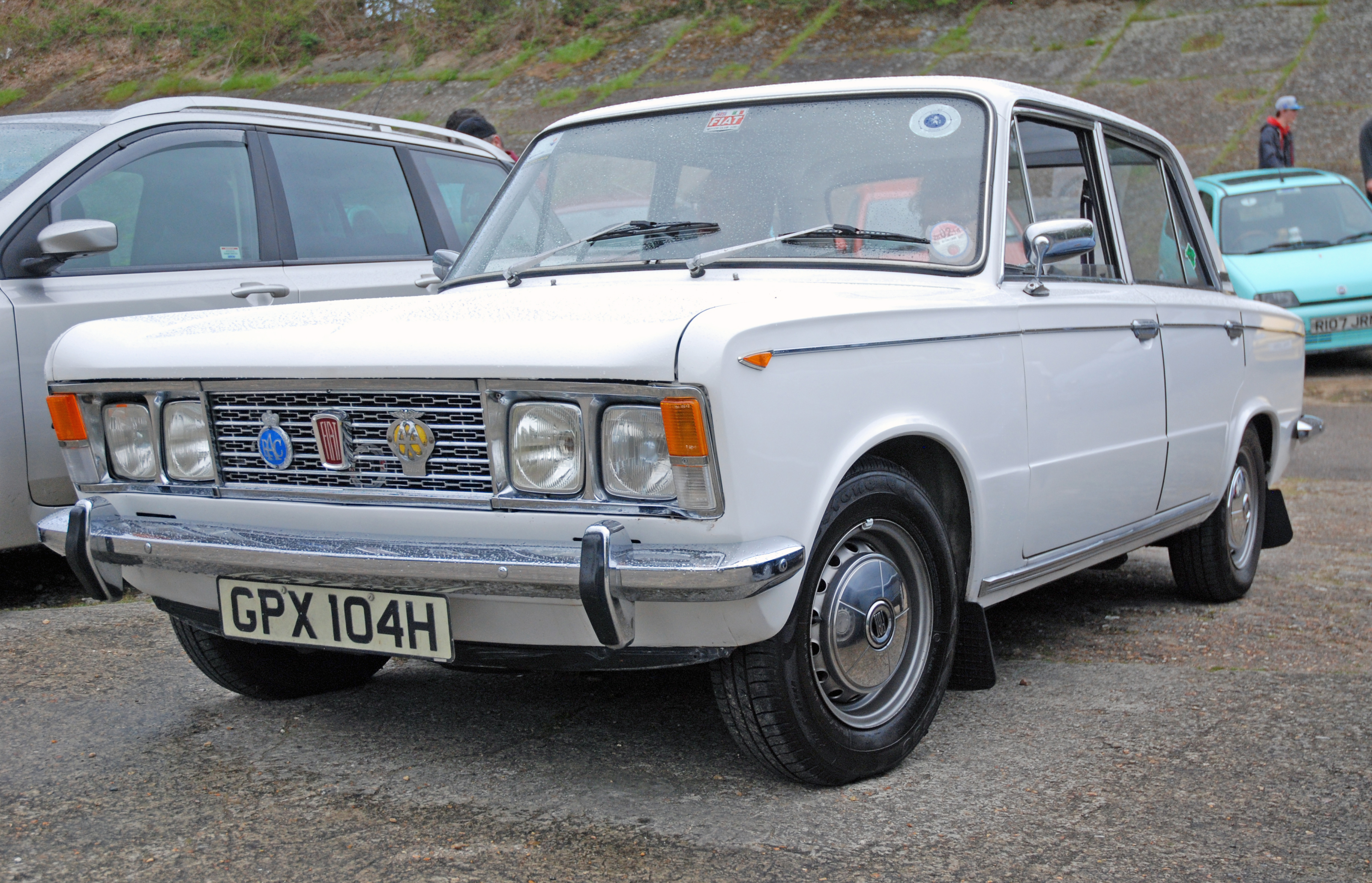
Fiat 125 in UK

Production by Fiat in Italy ceased in 1972 when the Fiat 132 was introduced, a total of 603,877 cars having been built, although it continued for many years in different markets.

== Foreign production ==
=== Poland ===
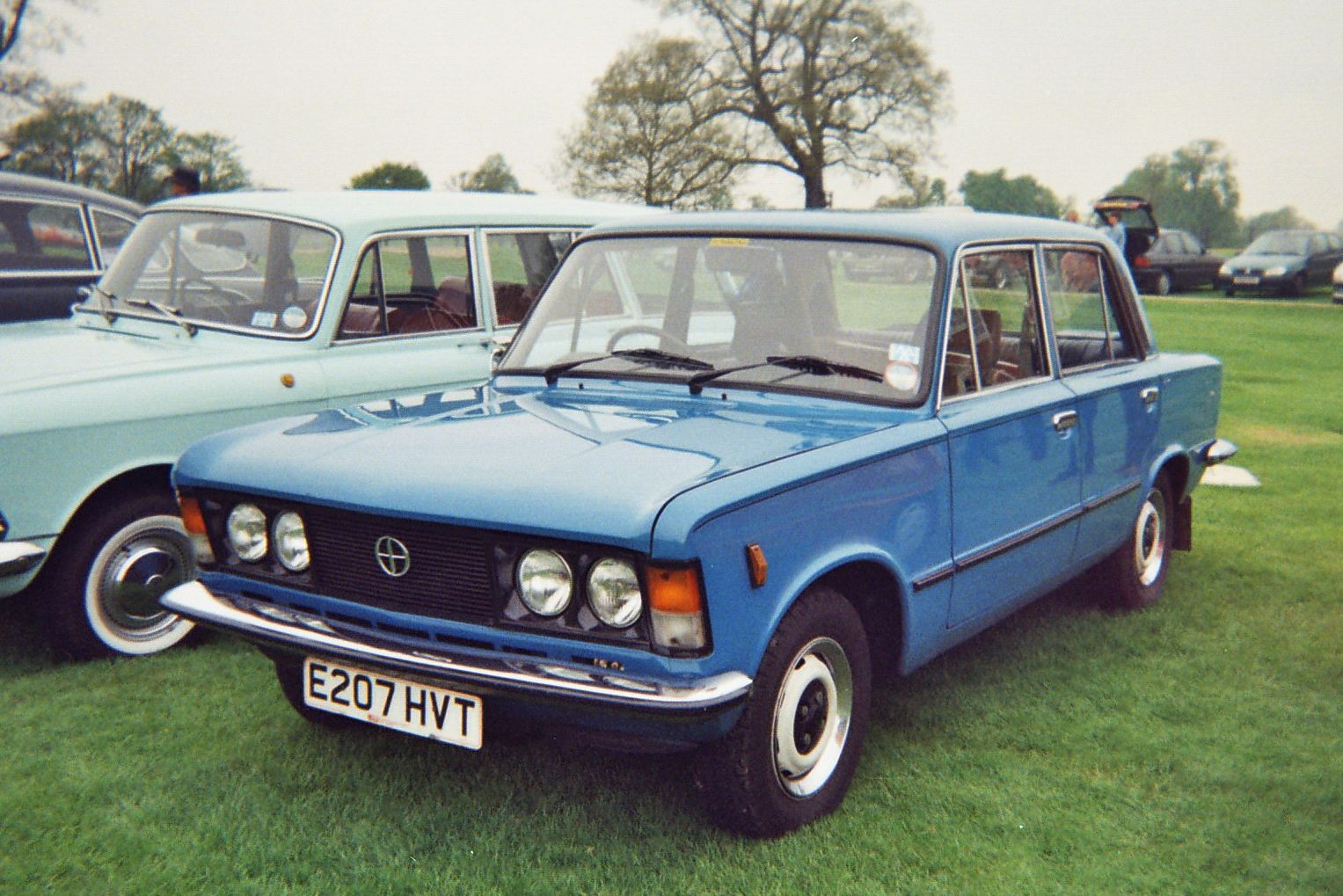
Polski Fiat 125p in UK (after 1983)

A licence copy was also produced in Poland by the Fabryka Samochodów Osobowych (FSO) from 1967 until 1991, under the brand Polski Fiat as the Polski Fiat 125p, and later as the FSO 1500, FSO 1300, or FSO 125p.

It was a somewhat simplified variation of the Fiat car, with outdated 1300 cc or 1500 cc engines and mechanicals from the Fiat 1300 and 1500. Polish cars differed in details from Italian ones, most visible were four round headlights instead of square ones, simpler bumpers and front grille, orange front turn signal lenses, different shape details in tail and front lamps design, simpler body sheet metal stampings, old Fiat 1300/1500 chassis and interior. This model was also available as an estate (the Polski Fiat 125p Kombi) and a pickup developed in Poland after Italian Fiat 125 production ended in 1972.

=== Yugoslavia/Serbia ===
Zastava started producing the Fiat 125p in 1969, in an effort to replace the Zastava 1300/1500. The body panels and chassis were imported from Poland, while the mechanical parts were reused from the already locally produced Zastava 1300. The name was changed to Zastava 125pz (adding a "z" for Zastava), earning the nickname "pezejac". While the Polish 125p was available with two different engine options, a 1300cc variant and a 1500cc variant, only the 1300cc was available in the 125pz. Production lasted until 1972, when the production of the new Zastava 101 ramped up. Zastava then started importing complete Polish Fiat 125p models, and selling them as the Zastava 125p (without the "z"), garnering the nickname "pejac". The Zastava 125p was only available with the 1500cc engine. This went on until 1983.

=== Egypt ===
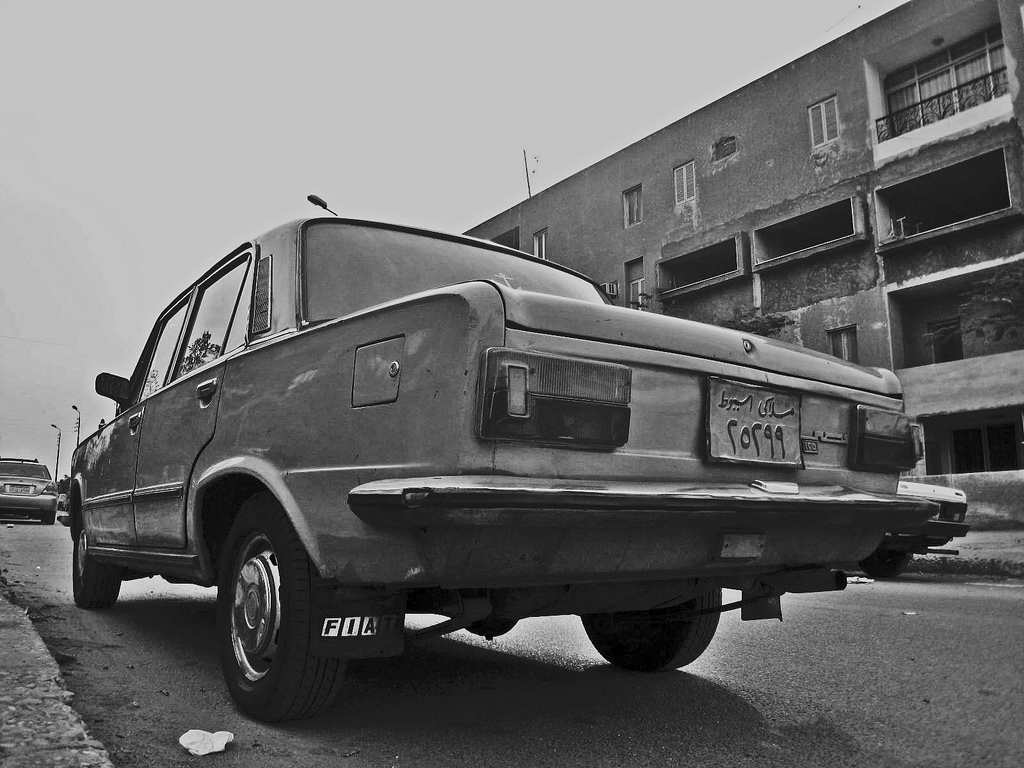
Nasr 125.

In Egypt production of the Polish 125p version went on under the name Nasr 125 until 1983.

=== Argentina ===
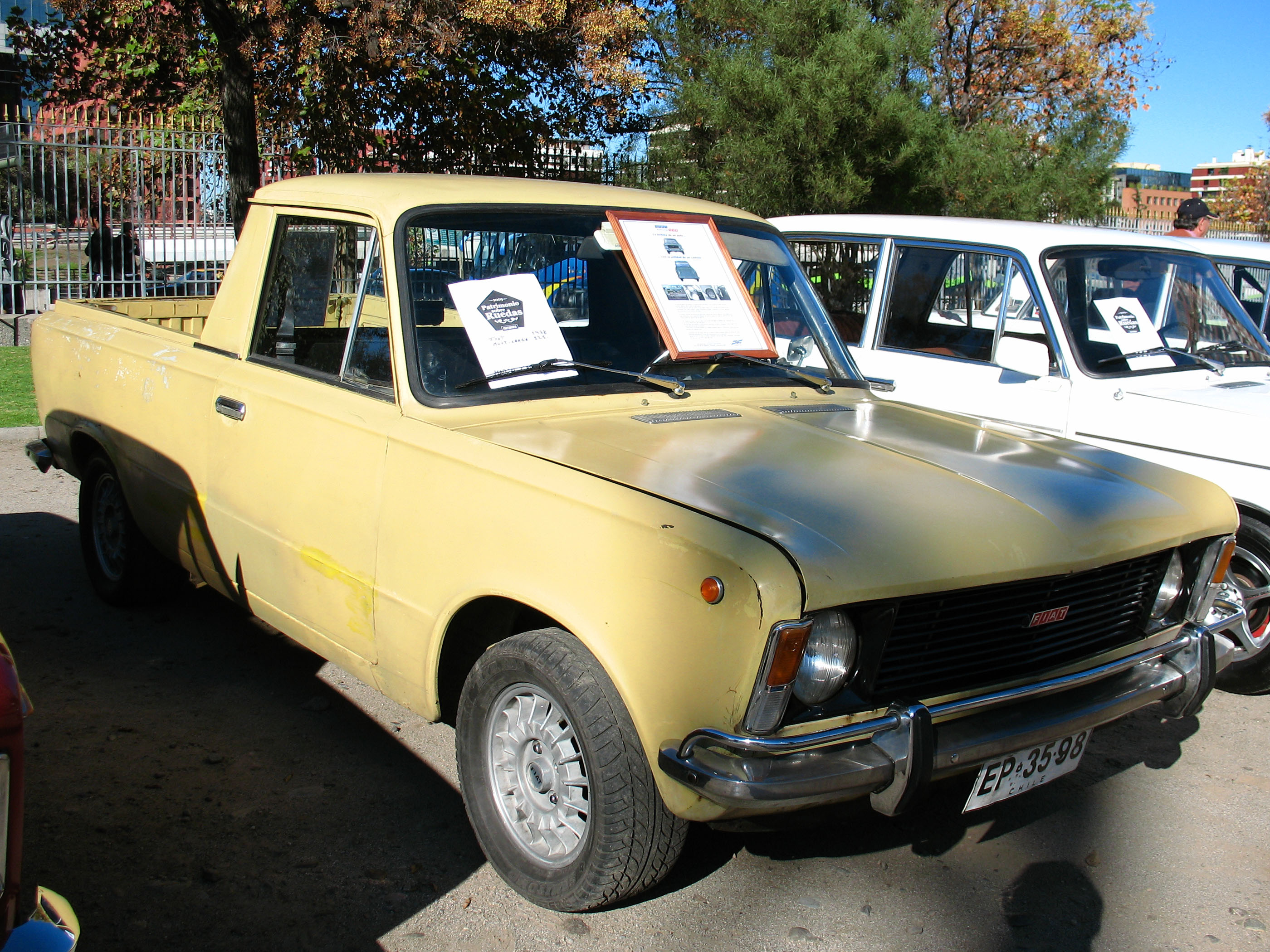
1978 Fiat 125 Multicarga

In Argentina the 125 was built from 1972 to 1982, initially by Fiat-Concord and later by Sevel Argentina. In addition to the 4-door sedan version, a station wagon (called "Familiar"), a pickup (called "Multicarga", a unique Argentine design) were built. There was also a coupe called 125 Sport with the same mechanics as the sedan, but based on the Fiat Coupé 1500 Vignale.

=== Colombia ===
A few copies were made of Italian 125 and was quickly replaced by Polish 125p better suited to the local market.

=== Chile ===
A car that was manufactured almost equal to the Fiat 125 Special restyling in march of 1970.

=== Morocco ===
SOMACA (Société Marocaine de Construction Automobile) assembled 125 in Casablanca.

== Motorsport activity ==
The Fiat 125 also achieved success in rallying and endurance events, where its durability and reliability contributed to strong results, often with few mechanical retirements. In racing specification, the engine output reportedly reached approximately 145 horsepower. Its performance helped reinforce Fiat's renewed involvement in motorsport, including support for private entrants.

One notable result came in the 1969 24 Hours of Nürburgring, where a Fiat 125 driven by Ratazzi, Luca Montezemolo, and Ceccato finished ninth overall. The car was reportedly close to standard specification.
