= Pollan =

Pollan may refer to:

- Pollan (fish), or Irish pollan
- Carolyn Pollan (1937–2021), American politician
- Carlos Pollán (born 1966), Spanish handball player and politician
- Michael Pollan (born 1955), American author
- Tracy Pollan (born 1960), American actress

== See also ==
- Polan (disambiguation)
- Polian (disambiguation)
