= Kingdom of Poland (1830–1831) =

Coat of amrs of November Uprising

Kingdom of Poland (1830–1831) was a period in the history of the Congress Poland from the dethronement of Emperor Nicholas I from the Polish throne and thus breaking the personal union with the Russian Empire, until the end of the November Uprising. It was not a new political creation, but only a new concept of the existence of the state, which stated, among other things, breaking away from any dependence on the Russian Empire and its emperor.

== Temporary regime ==
The Kingdom of Poland retained the Constitution of the Kingdom of Poland (1815) with the exception of the articles binding the Kingdom with the Russian Empire through the person of the emperor-king. The political system of the Kingdom of Poland changed as a result of the resolutions of the insurgent Sejm, meeting in the conditions of an open Polish-Russian war.

The legal acts that formed the basis for the functioning of the new Polish authorities were: the Sejm resolution of December 18, 1830, recognizing the uprising as national the Sejm dethrone Nicholas I on January 25, 1831 and declared the establishment of the National Government on January 29, 1831, resolution on the homage to the Polish nation of February 8, 1831.

== Country symbols ==
On February 7, 1831, the Chamber of Deputies of the insurrectionary Sejm, by a majority of votes, adopted white and red cockade as the national color, accepting the argument of the MP Walenty Zwierkowski that the coat of arms of Poland represents White Eagle in a red field. This project was unanimously supported by the Senate and implemented on the same day.

== See also ==
- November Uprising

== Bibliography ==
- Poland's history in numbers. Population. Territory, Warsaw 1993, p. 68.
- Independent Kingdom of Poland during the November Uprising 1830-1831, in: Central Archives of Historical Records, resource guide, vol. II Epoka post-partition, Warsaw 1998, pp. 335-368.
- Wacław Tokarz, Polish-Russian War 1830 and 1831, Warsaw 1993, in the content.
