= Polan (surname) =

Polan is a surname. Notable people with the surname include:

- Jason Polan (1982–2020), American artist
- Lincoln M. Polan, the defendant in Kinney Shoe Corp v Polan
- Nina Polan (1927–2014), Polish-American actress and theatre director

== See also ==
- Polan (disambiguation)
