= Poulin =

Poulin is a surname, and may refer to:

- Alfred Poulin (1938–1996), American poet and translator (e.g. Rilke)
- Bernard Poulin (born 1945), Canadian visual artist
- Charles Poulin (born 1972), Canadian men’s ice hockey player
- Dave Poulin (born 1958), Canadian men’s ice hockey player
- François Poulin de Francheville (1692–1733), Montreal merchant
- Frédéric Poulin, Canadian politician
- Georges Poulin (1887–1971), Canadian men’s ice hockey player
- Jacques Poulin (1937–2025), Canadian novelist
- Joseph-Napoléon Poulin (1821–1892), French physician and political figure
- Julien Poulin (1946–2025), Canadian actor, film director, screenwriter and film producer
- Kevin Poulin (born 1990), Canadian men’s ice hockey player
- Marie-Paule Poulin (born 1945), Canadian senator and President of the Liberal Party of Canada
- Marie-Philip Poulin (born 1991), Canadian women's ice hockey player
- Mike Poulin (born 1985), Canadian men’s lacrosse player
- Patrick Poulin (born 1973), Canadian men’s ice hockey player
- Robert Poulin (born 1963), Canadian evolutionary biologist
- Vanessa Poulin, American politician

== See also ==
- Poulain (disambiguation)
- Poulenc
