= Polski Fiat 125p =

Polish motor vehicle

Polski Fiat 125p FSO 125p
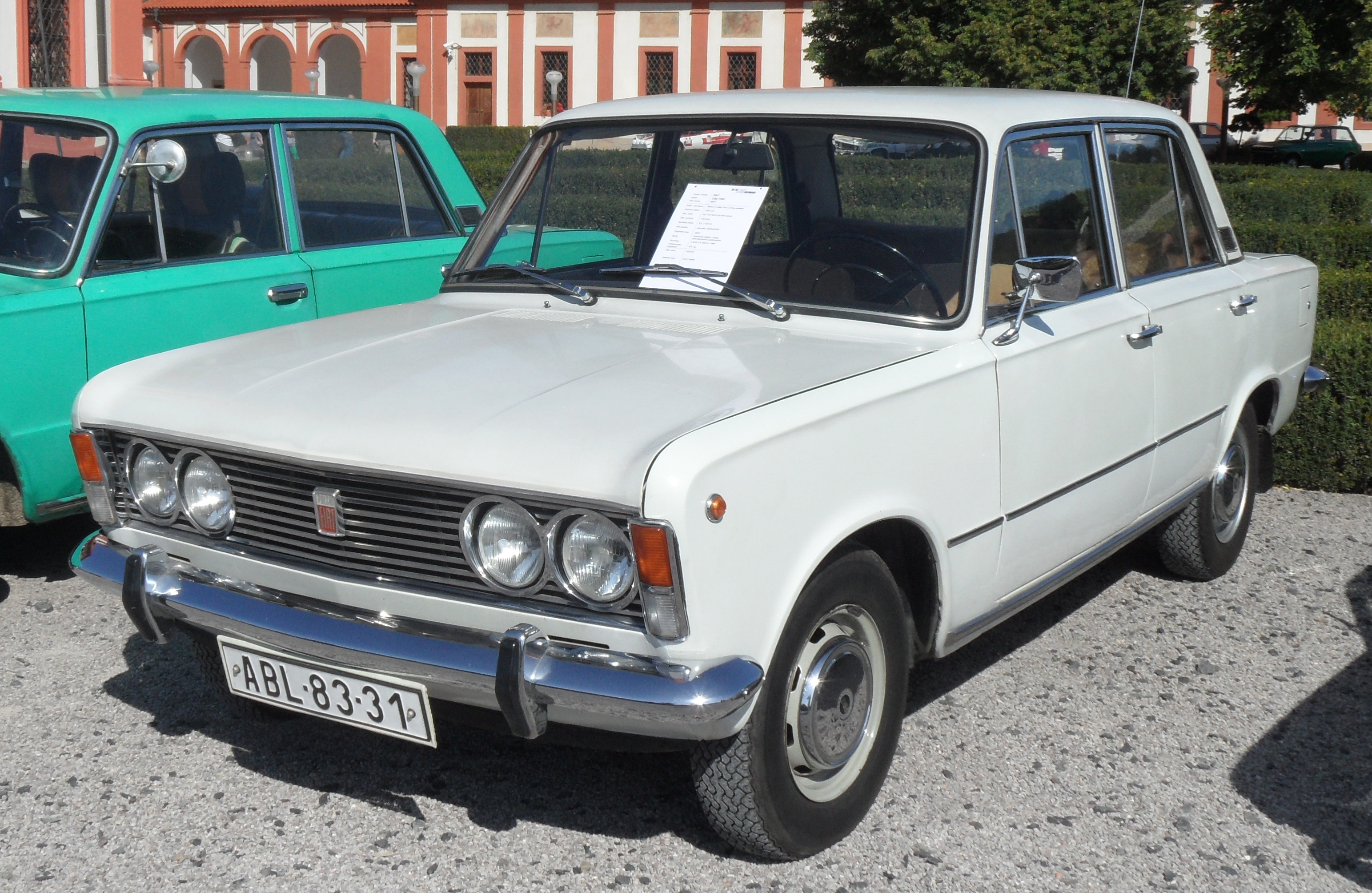

Overview
- Manufacturer: FSO
- Also called: FSO 1300/1500; Nasr 125; Zastava 125pz
- Production: November 1967– June 1991
- Assembly: Poland: Warsaw; Egypt: Cairo (Nasr); Yugoslavia: Kragujevac (Zastava); Colombia: Bogotá (CCA); Indonesia: Jakarta; Thailand: Bangkok (Karnasuta)
- Designer: Dante Giacosa

Body and chassis
- Class: Large family car
- Body style: 4-door saloon 5-door estate 2-door pick-up
- Related: Fiat 1300 and 1500; Fiat 125; FSO Polonez

Powertrain
- Engine: 1295 cc OHV I4; 1481 cc OHV I4; 1600 Fiat DOHC I4; 1800 Fiat DOHC I4
- Transmission: 4-speed manual (1967–1988); 5-speed manual (1988–1991)

Dimensions
- Wheelbase: 2,505 mm (98.6 in)
- Length: 4,230 mm (166.5 in)
- Width: 1,625 mm (64.0 in)
- Height: 1,440 mm (56.7 in)
- Kerb weight: 970 kg (2,138 lb)

Chronology
- Predecessor: FSO Warszawa 223/224
- Successor: FSO Polonez

Polski Fiat 125p is a motor vehicle manufactured between 1967 and 1991 in Poland under a Fiat license by the state-owned manufacturer Fabryka Samochodów Osobowych (FSO). It was a simplified and altered variation of the original, Italian-made Fiat 125, with engines and mechanicals from the Fiat 1300 and 1500. To distinguish between the models, Fiat and FSO revived the marque Polski Fiat. After termination of the license, the car was branded as FSO 1300, FSO 1500 and FSO 125p.

== History and development ==
In the 1960s, the only passenger car manufacturer in socialist Poland was the FSO in Warsaw, which manufactured the dated Syrena small car and the Warszawa, a larger model whose roots could be traced back to 1940s. Even within the realities of a centrally planned, socialist economy, the need for a replacement was felt. Although Warszawa-based replacements had been under development within the FSO, the authorities decided to pursue talks with the Italian Fiat, which was seeking to expand its international presence by establishing production in the countries of the Eastern Bloc.

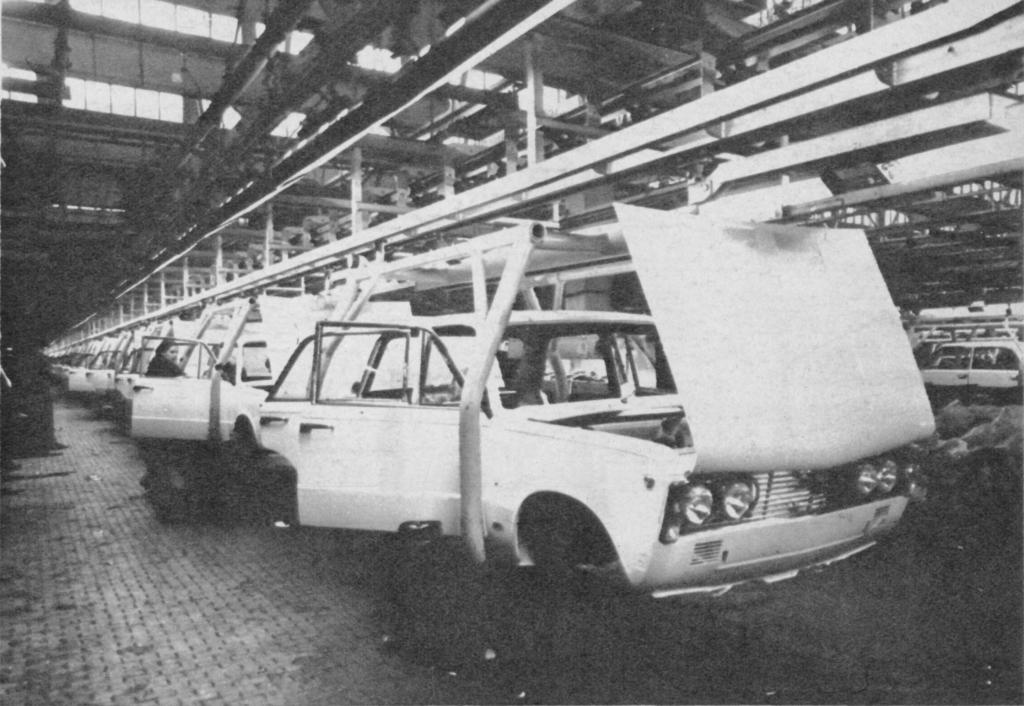
Production of the Fiat 125p in the FSO factory (pre-1973)

On the 22 December 1965, a license agreement was signed concerning manufacturing of intermediate-sized cars in Poland. The automobile concerned was a model specially devised for production in Poland, combining the body and braking system of the newly launched Fiat 125 with the driveline and other chassis elements from the retired Fiat 1300/1500. The FSO plant had to be refurbished to be able to handle the assembly of a modern car, so machinery was ordered from Western companies. FSO's over 100 Polish suppliers were also involved in the effort, as well as other manufacturers from the Eastern European assembling Fiat-licensed models – Crvena Zastava works in Yugoslavia and the newly organised VAZ in the Soviet Union. The production preparation process took almost two years, with the assembly of pre-production test series from parts imported from Italy commencing on 28 November 1967. By the end of the year, 75 such cars had been assembled.

=== Cars ===
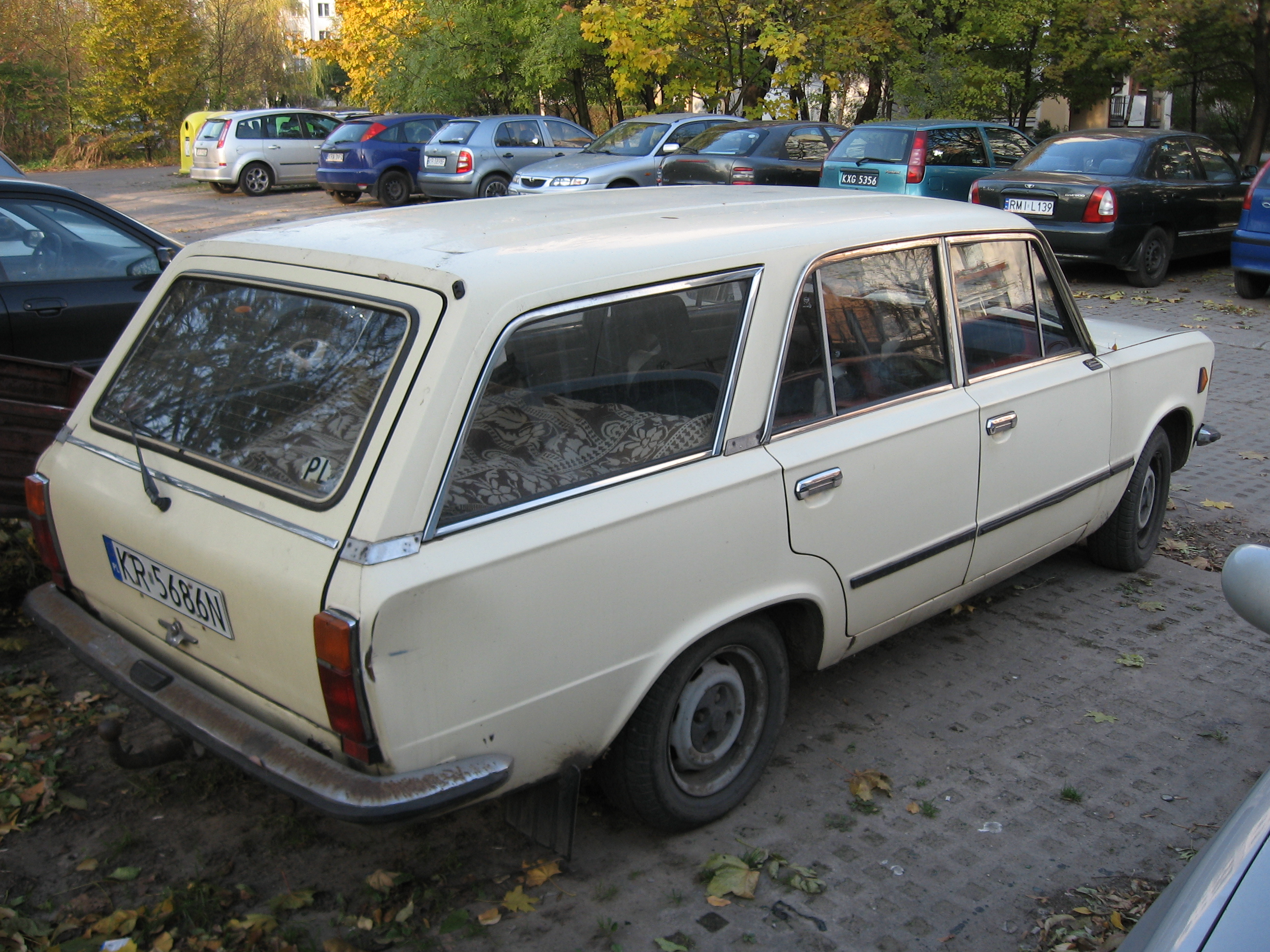
1984–1986 FSO 125p Kombi

There were two main versions, differing in the engine employed: the 1300 model (1295 cc, 60 PS, 44 kW), entering into production in 1968 to go on until the late 1980s, and the 1500 (1481 cc, 75 PS, 55 kW), from 1969. Polish cars differed in many details from Italian ones: most visible were the double round headlights instead of the square ones, simpler bumpers and front grille, orange colour front turn signal lenses, simpler body sheet metal stampings, and the old Fiat 1300/1500 chassis and interior (dashboard, column shifter etc.). A less visible but more significant change in the Polski Fiat was a safer flat fuel tank above the rear axle, instead of Fiat's vertical tank on the rear right-hand side. All four wheels had safe and reliable disc brakes, which also were standard on the Italian 125.

Unlike the Fiat 125, the car was also available as an estate (125p Kombi; introduced in 1972), and as a pickup developed in Poland from the Kombi after Italian Fiat 125 production ended. The pickup was first shown in 1972 but only entered production in 1975. The station wagon won the 1978 Estate Car of the Year Award in the United Kingdom.

Since 1973, the Italian Fiat 125's successor, the Fiat 132, was produced locally in Poland as the Polski Fiat 132p. The car was described as "assembled by FSO", though actually the cars were shipped from Italy almost complete. FSO only did the final assembly, fitting minor parts like wipers, batteries, seats, wheels and logos. It was only produced in small numbers until 1981.

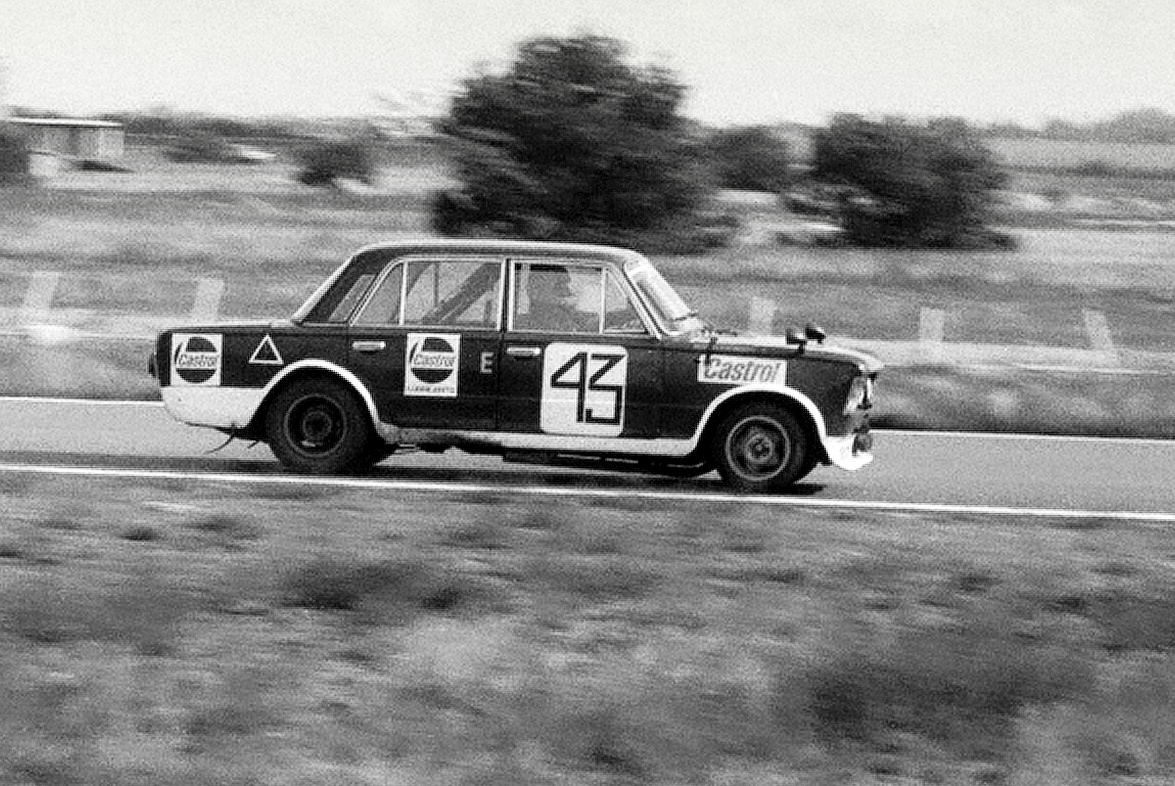
Polski Fiat 125p Akropolis 1800 (1979)

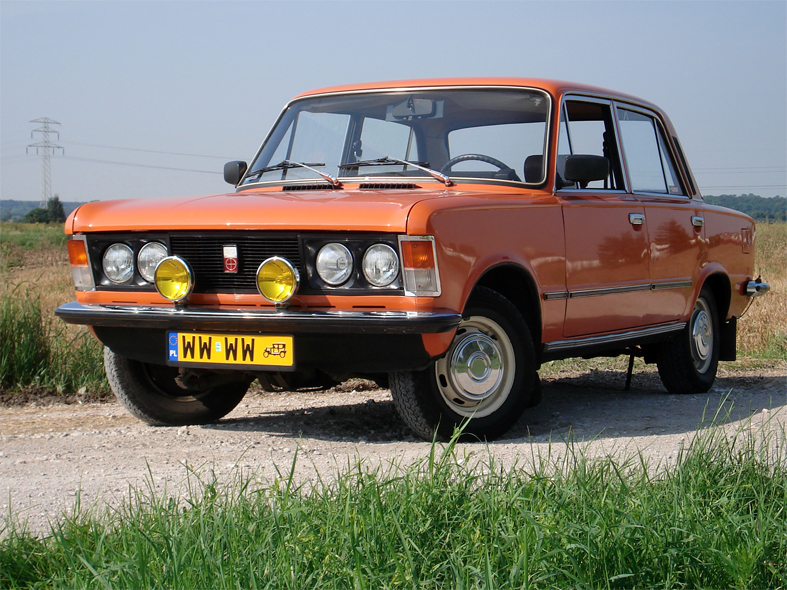
Polski Fiat 125p (1980)

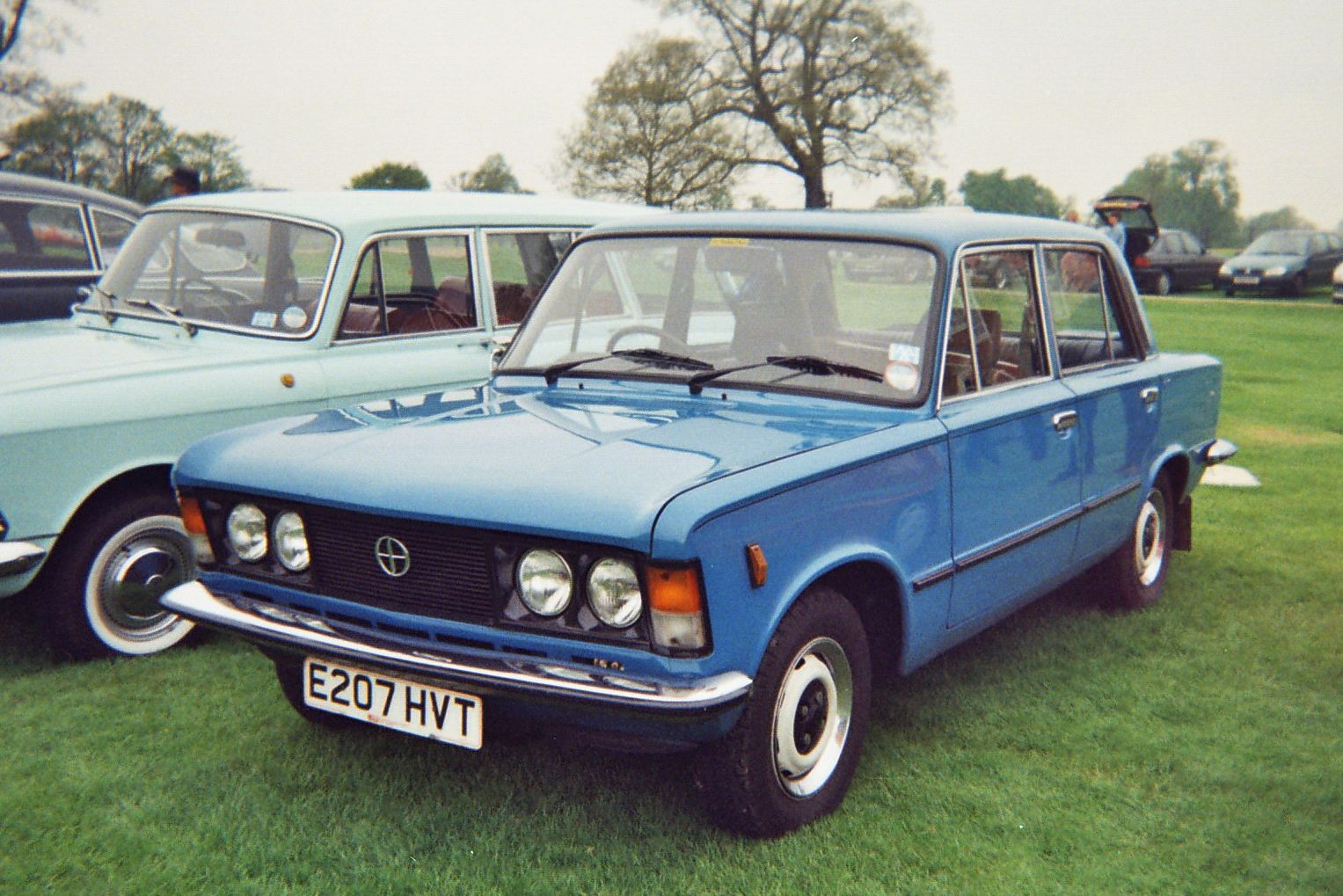
FSO 125p UK market right-hand-drive (1987)

A few homologation specials were made with Italian-made 1600 cc (125p Monte Carlo) and 1800 cc (125p Akropolis) twin-cam engines, intended mainly for rallying. An unusual variant built in a small series was a lengthened cabriolet with three rows of seats, used by the tourist bureau in Warsaw for sightseeing.

There was a minor restyling in 1973, when the chrome front grille was replaced with a black plastic one, and in 1975, when a new black plastic grille arrived along with new turn indicators, enlarged horizontal rear lamps (instead of pairs of thin vertical ones), and a slightly modernised interior: a new plastic dashboard and steering wheel, hubcaps featuring modern stamped patterns, new bumpers with horizontal strips of rubber which replaced paired vertical guards. The power of both engines was also raised by 3.7 kW. From 1983, the car was produced as the FSO 125p 1500/1300. In the late 1980s the 125p received its last upgrade in form of power train from the FSO Polonez and a new instrument cluster featuring round gauges in place of the classic Fiat speedometer.

The car was produced until 26 June 1991 (to fulfill factory preproduction sales obligation – the communist prepayments system, system przedpłat); in total, 1,445,689 were manufactured. By that time the design was 24 years old and used mechanicals which were essentially 30 years old, with only minor improvements.

=== Successor ===
From 1978, a version with an entirely new body was available – the FSO Polonez. The Polonez survived with improvements until 2002.

== Exports ==
In the UK & Ireland (where it had been available in right-hand-drive form since 1975) the Polski Fiat had been the cheapest car on the market for some time – £3099 in late 1991. It retained 1960s styling, durable but comfortable leatherette seats and cavernous amounts of space. Mechanically, the 125p was rugged and reliable.

Also, the car's performance was less than that of the Italian 125, and its handling capabilities came nowhere close to those of the original design. It also suffered from a very rough ride due to the leaf-sprung rear suspension layout. Not even the bargain basement prices could disguise the outdated drivetrain.

By the time of the car's demise, the Lada Riva, itself derived from the Fiat 124, was the only similar Eastern European car available in the UK. Škoda had abandoned its range of rear-engined saloons and coupés in favour of modern front-engined hatchbacks, Zastava only offered the Yugo, and the (East German) Wartburgs were no longer available.

== Nicknames ==
In Poland the Fiat 125p is called "Kredens" ("Cupboard"), "Kant" ("Edge") or "Bandyta"/"Bandzior" ("bandit"/"cut-throat") by the younger members of society. The most common nickname is "Duży Fiat" (the big Fiat), as opposed to the Fiat 126p which is called "Maluch"/"Mały Fiat" ("Small one"/"Small Fiat"). In Hungary, people usually call it "Nagypolski" or "Nagypolák" ("Big Polski"), while the 126 is dubbed "Kispolski" or "Kispolák" ("Small Polski"). In Serbo-Croatian, the 125p was called "Pezejac" (because it was marketed as PZ for Polski/Zastava), while the 126p was nicknamed "Peglica", which means "Little Iron", as in a smoothing iron, an iron used to press clothing. In Czechoslovakia it was called "Polák" ("Pole"). In Finland the FSO 125p pick-up was officially sold as the "FSO Polle" ("Horse"); some versions also had a large fiberglass cover over the bed.

== See also ==
- Polski Fiat 126p
