= Frederick Poland =

English clergyman and cricketer

Frederick William Poland (10 October 1858 – ?1940) was an English clergyman and a cricketer who played in one first-class cricket match for Cambridge University in 1881. He was born at Shepherd's Bush, London. His death is less certain; in one source, he was living in 1940, the year of his apparent death, at Town of Mount Royal, Montreal, Quebec, Canada, though the exact date and circumstances of death are not known. In the record of his parish at Mount Royal, however, his death is given as 1937, again with no detail (and the church has his birth-year wrong, claiming he was born in 1859).

The fourth son of the Rev. Frederick Poland, a Church of England clergyman who was vicar of Paignton, Devon from 1861 to 1891, Poland was educated at a private school called Newton College in Devon and at Trinity College, Cambridge. He played cricket for club and amateur teams in Devon, and also played in a trial match at Cambridge University in 1881, when he batted low down in a line-up of 16 batsmen against the preferred university first team, and scored 31 and 13. A right-handed batsman and a wicketkeeper, he was picked for only one first-class game, the match against the "Gentlemen of England" amateur team, and made an unbeaten four in his only innings; he also made two catches and three stumpings as wicketkeeper. He was not picked again in first-class cricket, but he continued to play in less important games, including matches for Devon and Hertfordshire, and some of his Hertfordshire games from the mid-1890s were in the Minor Counties competition.

Poland graduated from Cambridge University with a Bachelor of Arts degree in 1882. Like his father, he became a Church of England clergyman, and he was curate at Stevenage, Hertfordshire, from 1884 to 1892. From 1904, he was based in North America and from 1912 until his retirement in 1933 he was a priest at churches in Montreal.
