= Polian (surname) =

Polian is a surname. Notable people with the surname include:

- Bill Polian (born 1942), American football executive
- Brian Polian (born 1974), another son of Bill; American football coach
- Chris Polian (fl. 2013), son of Bill; American football executive
- Pavel Polian (born 1952), Russian historian and geographer
- Sophie Taillé-Polian (born 1974), French politician
