= Polski Fiat =

Polish automaker founded in 1934

- Industry: Automotive
- Fate: Closed
- Successor: FCA Poland
- Headquarters: Poland
- Products: Automobiles

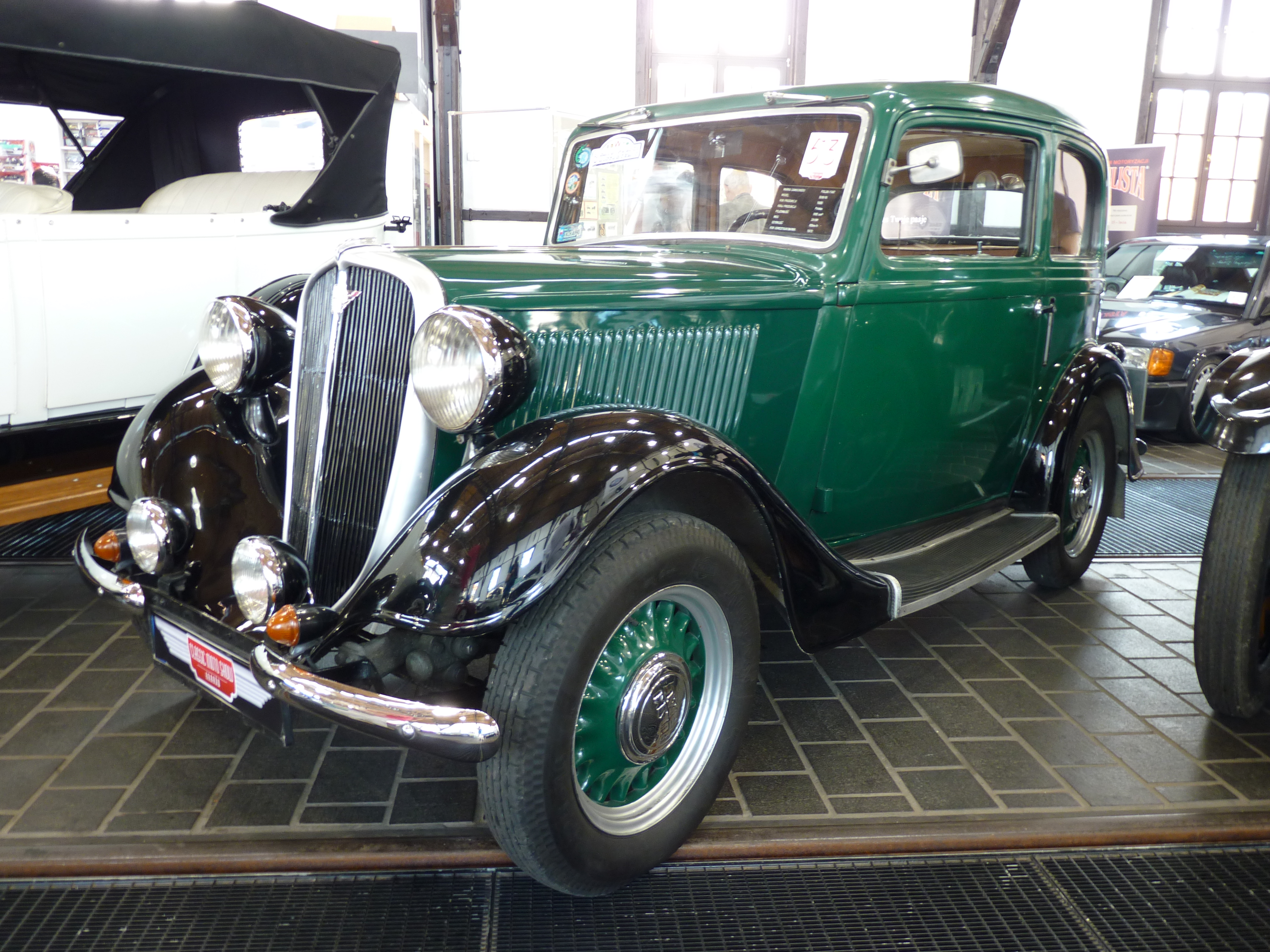
Polski Fiat 508 III Junak

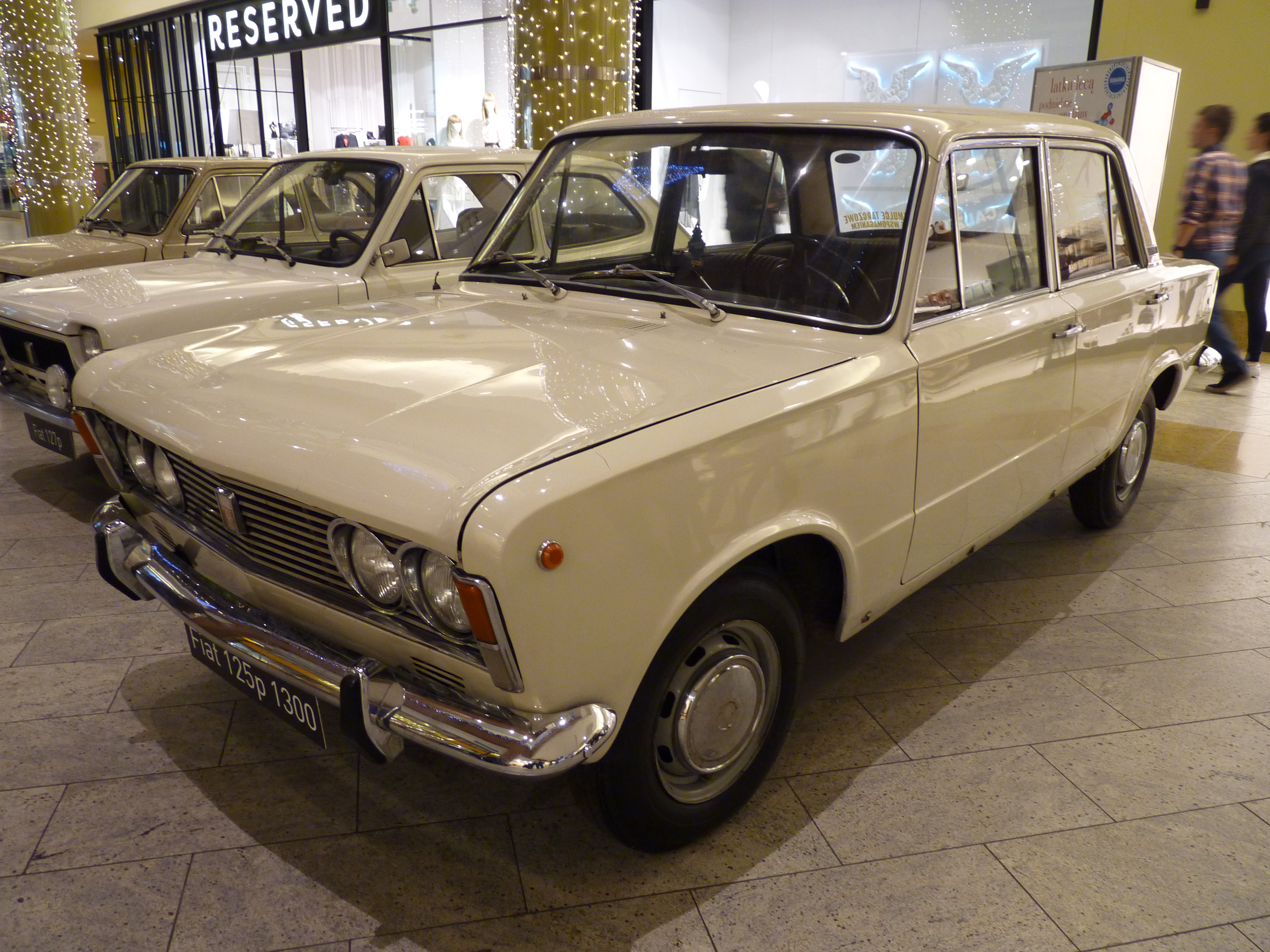
Polski Fiat 125p 1300

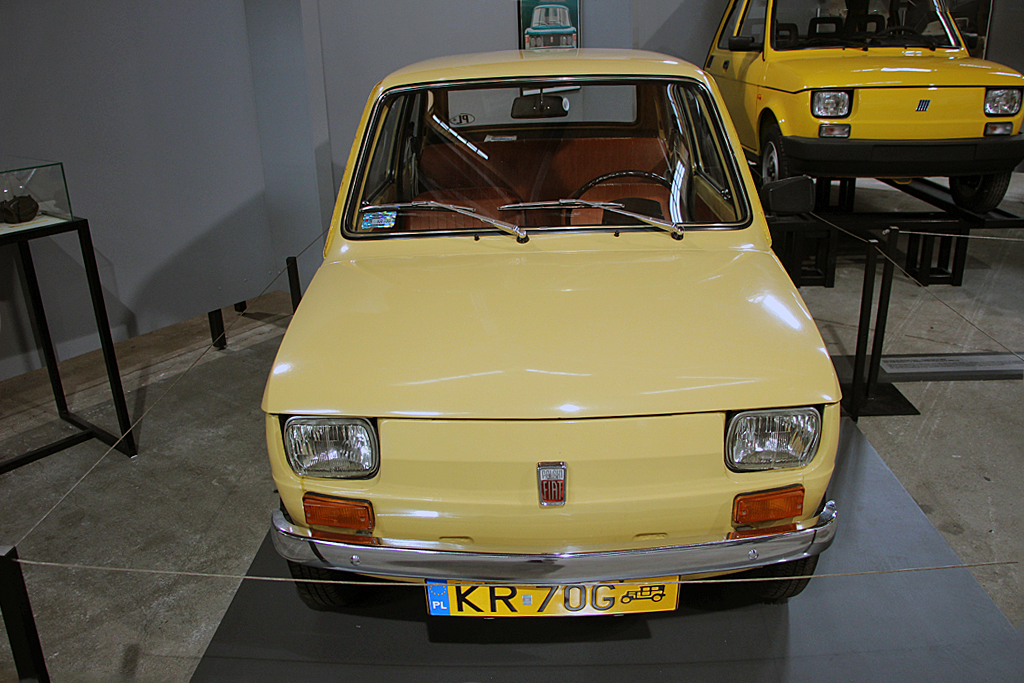
Polski Fiat 126p

Polski Fiat (literally in English: Polish Fiat) was a Polish car brand. Under this brand, cars under licence of the Italian manufacturer FIAT were manufactured or assembled in Poland.

== Before World War II ==
The brand was created in 1932, when the Polish government made an agreement with FIAT to produce licence cars in a state factory PZInż. (Państwowe Zakłady Inżynieryjne) in Warsaw. The cars were sold and serviced by the newly created Polish-Italian company Polski Fiat SA. First cars were assembled from Italian parts (a compact car PF 508/I), other later models were also assembled from parts, such as the small car Fiat Topolino. From the mid-1930s, the factory started to produce whole cars.

The main produced models were (PF stands for Polski Fiat):

- PF 508/III Junak - a compact car
- PF 518 Mazur - a mid-size car
- PF 618 Grom - 1.5 t truck
- PF 621L - 2.5 t truck, also in a bus variant PF 621R

Special military models, developed in Poland:

- PF 508/IIIW Łazik - passenger off-road car
- PF 518 Łazik - passenger off-road car
- PF 508/518 - utility off-road car and a light artillery tractor (based on parts of PF 508 and PF 518)

The brand ceased to exist after the outbreak of World War II, when the factory was seized by the Germans in 1939.

== After World War II ==
The brand Polski Fiat re-appeared in the 1960s, when the Polish government renewed connections with Fiat and bought a licence for a mid-size car Polski Fiat 125p.

The deal was signed in 1965, and the first cars were assembled from parts by the factory, FSO, in 1967, their production started from 1968 and ended in 1991, however the brand Polski Fiat was replaced with FSO (which had already been seen on other models such as the 125p-based FSO Polonez) in 1983.

Between 1973 and 2000 a second licensed model was produced by the FSM: the small Polski Fiat 126p, based on the Fiat 126. The separate brand Polski Fiat disappeared in 1994, when Fiat bought the Polish factory, and Fiat models have since been produced in Poland under the Fiat brand, which was used before 1992 in export markets only.

In 2013, the one millionth Fiat was built at the FCA Poland plant in Tychy. By November 2019, the plant had manufactured 12 million vehicles. A report in 2020 stated that the plant employed 2,200 people and built over 1,000 cars each day. At that time, it was manufacturing Fiat 500 (2007) and Lancia Ypsilon vehicles.

== See also ==
- Bulgarrenault
- Pirin-Fiat
- Oltcit
