= Toomas Napa =

Estonian racing driver

- Nationality: (Estonia) Estonian
- Born: 5 December 1953 Tartu

Championship titles
- 1987: Cup of Peace and Friendship

Toomas Napa (born 5 December 1953) is an Estonian racing driver. In 2001 he was chosen to BesofMotorsport Personnel (Estonian: tehnikasportlane) of 20th century of Estonia.

He began his racing career in 1968, when he joined a kart racing group. In 1987 he won Cup of Peace and Friendship. He is 9-times Soviet Union champion in different formula disciplines. He is also 2-times Estonian champion.

== Awards ==
- 2001: Best Motorsport Personnel (Estonian: tehnikasportlane) of 20th century of Estonia
- 2021: Chosen to Hall of Fame of Estonian motorsport celebrities

== Titles ==
- Cup of Peace and Friendship

Champion: 1987

- Soviet Formula 3 Championship

Champion: 1982, 1983, 1984, 1985, 1987

- Soviet Formula 4 Championship

Champion: 1974

== Results ==
=== Cup of Peace and Friendship ===
Year	Team	Car	1	2	3	4	5	6	7	DC	Points
1984	Jõud Tallinn	Estonia 21-M	MOS; 8	KIE; 8	BIK; 13	SLZ; Ret	RES; 7	ALB; 1		4th	198
1985	Jõud Tallinn	Estonia 21-M	MOS; 3	POZ; 9	BIK; 1	SLZ; 4	ALB; 1			2nd	184
1986	Jõud Tallinn	Estonia 21-M	POZ -	MOS; 1	HUN -	BIK; 1	SLZ; Ret	RES -	ALB; 1	10th	150
1987	Jõud Tallinn	Estonia 21-M	POZ; 2	SLZ; 2	HUN; 2	ALB; 2				1st	138

=== Soviet Formula 3 Championship ===
Year	Team	Car	1	2	3	4	DC	Points
1976	Jõud Tallinn	Estonia 18M	BIK; 3	BIK; 3	PIR; 3	PIR; 2	3rd	255
1981	Jõud Tallinn	Estonia 20	RUS; 5	CHA; 1	BIK; Ret		3rd	161
1982	Jõud Tallinn	Estonia 20	RUS; 1	CHA; 1	BIK; Ret		1st	200
1983	Jõud Tallinn	Estonia 21-M	RUS; 1	BIK; 1			1st	200
1984	Jõud Tallinn	Estonia 21-M	RUS; 1	BIK; 1	CHA -		1st	200
1985	Jõud Tallinn	Estonia 21-M	RUS; 1	CHA; 1	BIK -		1st	200
1986	Jõud Tallinn	Estonia 21-M	RUS; 1	CHA; Ret			4th	114
1987	DOSAAF Tallinn	Estonia 21-M	RUS; 1	CHA; 1	BIK; 1	BIK; 2	1st	330.5
