= Magnolia Circuit =

Street circuit near Szczecin, Poland

- Street Circuit (1968–1976)
- Location: Goleniów County, near Szczecin, Poland
- Coordinates: 53°25′26″N 14°46′15″E
- Opened: 1968
- Closed: May 1976; 50 years ago
- Major events: Former: Polish Auto Racing Championship (1973–1976); Cup of Peace and Friendship (1968–1970); Polish Formula Three Championship (1968)

Street Circuit (1968–1976)
- Surface: asphalt, concrete, basalt paving
- Length: 3.000 km (1.864 mi)
- Turns: 8
- Race lap record: 1:35.0 (Adam Smorawiński, 1973 Porsche Carrera RS, 1973, Sports car racing)

Magnolia Circuit (Polish pronunciation: [maɡˈnɔ.lja]; Polish: Tor Magnolia) was a street circuit set up on the motorway near the city of Szczecin, Poland, within modern boundaries of Goleniów County. It operated from 1968 to 1976.

== Description ==
It was a street circuit set up on the motorway near the city of Szczecin, Poland. Its surface consisted of parts made with asphalt, concrete, and basalt paving. Its total length was 3.000 km (1.864 mi). It had 8 turns in total, 5 of which were in right and 3 in left. The longest straight part of the track had the length of 600 m (660 yd).

== History ==
From 1968 to 1970, the circuit hosted the races of the Cup of Peace and Friendship. In 1968, the track hosted the race of the Polish Formula Three. From 1973 to 1976, it hosted the races of the Polish Auto Racing Championship tournament. The first elimination round of the Polish Auto Racing Championship, which took place between 22 and 23 May 1976 had been the last sports event to take place at the circuit. It had been attended by 10 000 people.

== Race winners ==
=== Cup of Peace and Friendship ===
- 1968: Miroslav Fousek
- 1969: Vladislav Ondřejík
- 1970: Vladimír Hubáček

=== Polish Formula Three ===
- 1968: Miroslav Fousek
