= Enn Griffel =

Racing driver

- Born: 5 April 1935 Assamalla, Estonia
- Died: 3 November 2007 (aged 72) Tallinn, Estonia

Championship titles
- 1968 1969 1971 1972 1975: Soviet Formula 3 Championship

Enn Griffel (Estonian: [ˈenː ˈɡ̊rifːel]; 5 April 1935 – 3 November 2007) was an Estonian auto racing driver, who participated in the Soviet Formula 3 Championship, Soviet Formula Junior, Formula Easter, and East German Formula Three Championship. He held USSR championship titles in Soviet Formula Three Championship in 1968, 1969, 1971, 1972, and 1975, and in Soviet Formula Junior in 1963. He became the Estonian champion in formula circuit racing four times: 1963 in Formula One, 1971, 1972, and 1975 in Formula Three class.

== Results ==
=== Soviet Formula 3 Championship ===
Year	Team	Car	1	2	3	4	DC	Points
1969	Kalev Tallinn	Estonia 9	MIN; 1	BIK; 1	BIK; 3	NEV; 1	1st	35
1971	Kalev Tallinn	Estonia 9	MIN; Ret	BIK; 1	PIR; 1		1st	200
1972	Kalev Tallinn	Estonia 9	MIN; 1	BIK; 1	PIR; 2		1st	283
1973	Kalev Tallinn	Estonia 18	MIN; Ret	PIR; 2	BIK; 5		5th	153

== History ==
Enn Griffel was born on 5 April 1935 in Assamalla, Republic of Estonia.

He began participating in the auto racing competitions in 1960. In 1960, he had third place in the classification of the Soviet Formula Three Championship, and, in 1967, 1974, and 1976, he had second place. In 1963, he was the champion of the Soviet Formula Junior, and in 1971, 1972, and 1975, of the Soviet Formula Three Championship. In 1971, he participated in one race of the East German Formula Three Championship. In 1974, he had a fourth place in Formula Easter. He also participated in the development and testing of the Estonia race cars, manufactured by Tallinna Autode Remondi Katsetehas.

Griffel died on 3 November 2007, in Tallinn, Estonia.

== Private life ==
He was married to Milvi Akberg-Griffel, a middle-distance runner, with whom, he had a daughter, Lea Vakra, who also was a middle-distance runner. Enn Griffel's grandson is Rainer Vakra, who was a member of the State Assembly of Estonia.
