= Kavor Motorsport =

- Industry: Racing cars, metal structures, car conversion, welding work
- Predecessor: Estonia Race Cars
- Founded: 1944
- Headquarters: Tallinn, Estonia
- Website: www.kavor.ee

Kavor Motorsport (formerly Tallinna Autode Remondi Katsetehas, also referred as TARK) was an Estonian Motorsport team that was manufacturing Estonia formula cars. It was founded in 1944 as Autoderemonditehas Sirp ja Vasar. Production of formula cars started in 1957 September and the first car was named Estonia. In all together there was built 1331 Estonia formula cars which makes them one of the most formula cars produced factory behind Lola.

Currently Kavor Motorsport is one of the leading metal processing companies in Estonia.

== History ==
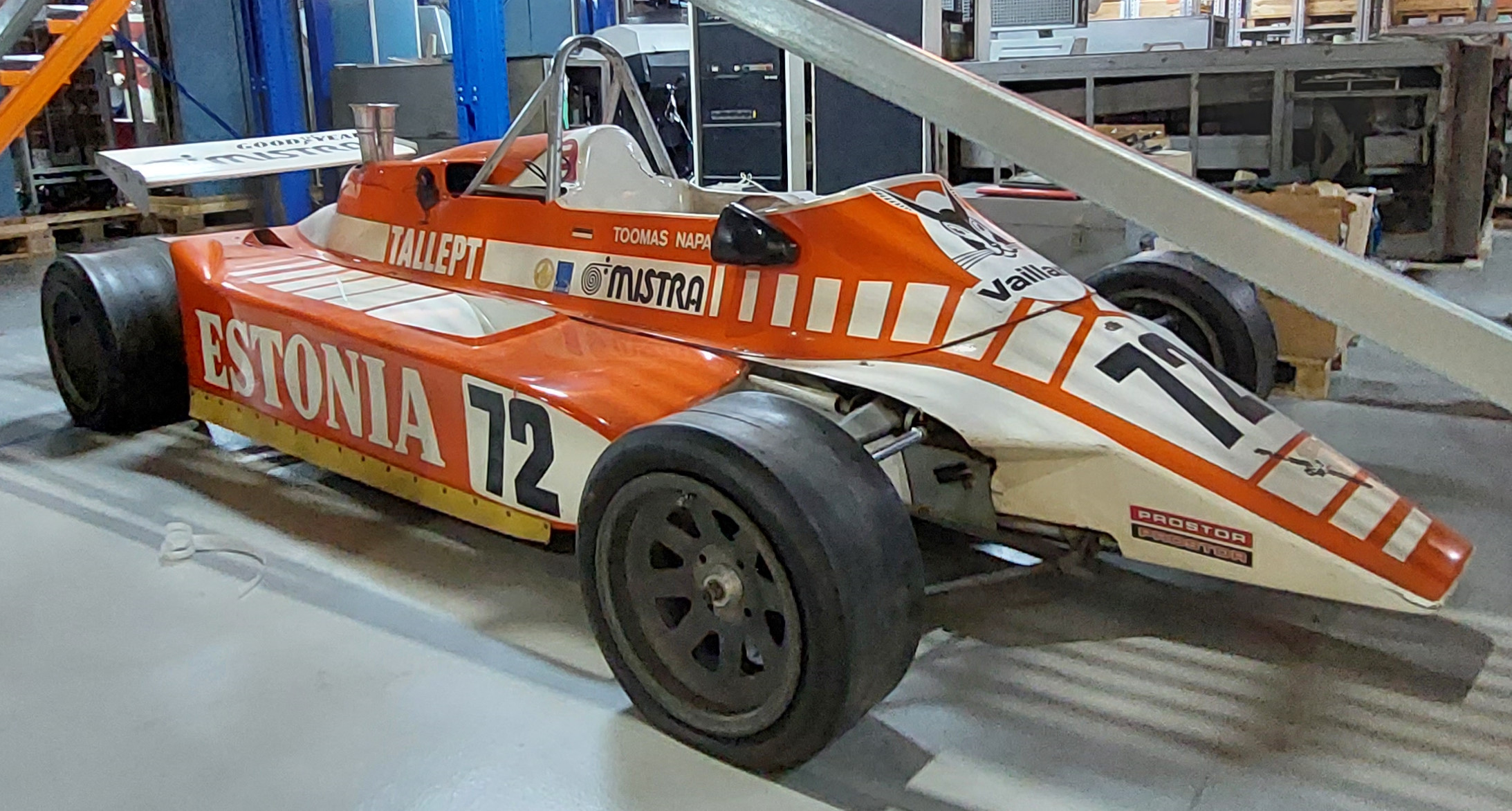
Estonia 21

In 1935, Hans Feierbach founded a machine factory named Feierbach & KO. By 1941 there was over eighty workers working in the factory.

After the World War II the company was nationalized and named Autoderemonditehas Sirp ja Vasar. In 1952 the factory was named Tallinna Autoderemonditehas nr.1 and the new factory building was constructed. The factory was ready in 1958.

In 1957 September led by Ants Seiler the first production of racing car started which was designed by himself. The powerunit was 500 cm³ motorcycle engine and the gearbox was found from Volkswagen. The first car was named Estonia to express their homeland.

The first race for this car was in 1958 in Leningrad, Kirov named stadium, where track record was immediately broken. The first Estonia car was significantly faster than other racing cars in that track especially thanks to better cornering. Although Ants Seiler retired in that race, the Estonia race car had proven itself to others.

Inspired by the success of that car, Seiler made a proposition to build another two racing cars. Estonia 2 ja 3 differed significantly from their predecessor in terms of suspension and transmission. Construction of these racing cars was supported by local Autotransport Ministry.

By the summer in 1959 both cars were ready and the first start was made in Minsk SSR Championship, where Väino Paasik who was driving with Estonia 3 finished fourth in that race. Although little unsuccess at the beginning the Estonia formula cars series production started because there were orders from all over the Soviet Union.

In 1961 there were already built 36 Estonia 3 cars, which were driven by drivers from all over the Soviet Union. Ants Seiler won the Soviet Formula 3 Championship that year. In that year motorcycle racer Jaan Küünemäe joined the factory and started the construction of Estonia 4. The production was cancelled due to the financial problems of the factory. That is why Ants Seiler went to Tartu Autoderemonditehas nr.2 and started to build sports cars.

In 1962 the new head constructor Roman Bertelov came to the factory, who started to build much bigger Estonia 5 car. Estonia 5 had Wartburg 900 cm³ engine and this car won gold and silver medals from Soviet Union Championship. They finished second in the manufactures championship in Cup of Peace and Friendship.

Estonia 5 did not become a serial car and only two of them were made. In 1962–66, a lot of new models were made - a total of seven different models. All of these, only Estonia 9 went into serial production, of which a total of 39 cars were made.

In 1968 Enn Griffel won Soviet Formula 3 Championship with Estonia 9 and from that year all championship were won by Estonia race cars. From the year 1970 TARK factory received at least 50 orders for formula cars and 200 orders for Go-kart.

When from UFAA factory new 1500 cm³ engine was found, which was made for Moskvich 412. Then new formula cars were produced and they were named Estonia 16 and Estonia 16M. These cars had disc brakes and lightweight cast magnesium rims.

From 1970 Tallinna Autoderemonditehas nr.1 received orders from Soviet Central automoto union to at least 50 formula cars and to 200 go-karts. Estonia 13 got the first VAZ engine, these cars were started to produce from 1972 and all in all there were made 112 exemplars. Estonia 20 became the model that surpassed the total number of thousand produced racing cars.

Estonia 21, which constructed by legendary driver Raul Sarap, which was the most successful Estonia formula car by number of production. There were made total of 295 Estonia 21 formula cars.

Estonia 24 was first aluminium monocoque model, which was more lighter and stronger than its predecessors. Estonia 24 was followed by Estonia 25 and 26. Thanks to the collapse of the Soviet Union and new economy model the production stopped and there were only six cars built. Former Autoderemonditehas was named Kavor and was privatized.

In year 2000 Kavor Motorsport built modern formula car version which was rebuilt from Estonia 26 and it was named Estonia 26–9. The new model was capable to race in Formula 4 Championship all over Europe.
