= Autodrom Chayka =

Motorsport racetrack in Chaiky, Ukraine

- Location: Chaiky, Kyiv Oblast, Ukraine
- Coordinates: 50°26′21″N 30°17′35″E
- Capacity: 3,000
- FIA Grade: 4
- Owner: Society of Assistance to Defense of Ukraine
- Broke ground: 1973
- Opened: 27 June 1975; 50 years ago
- Former names: Chayka Motorsports Complex
- Major events: Current: SBKUA (2000–2021, 2023–); Former: Soviet CRC (1975, 1977–1982, 1984—1991); UkrSSR CRC (1975, 1977–1991); Cup of Peace and Friendship (1976–1983, 1986); Soviet MRRC (1977–1991); UkrSSR MRRC (1977–1991); UTC (1992–1998, 2005–2020)
- Website: chayka-ring.com.ua

Short course (2005–present)
- Surface: asphalt
- Length: 2.80 km (1.74 mi)
- Turns: 10

Short course (1975–2005)
- Surface: asphalt
- Length: 2.57 km (1.60 mi)
- Turns: 8

Long course (1975–2005)
- Surface: asphalt
- Length: 4.49 km (2.79 mi)
- Turns: 14

Autodrom Chayka (Ukrainian: Автодром «Чайка», romanized: Avtodrom «Chaika»), formerly known as Chayka Motorsports Complex (Ukrainian: Автомобільний спортивний комплекс «Чайка», romanized: Avtomobilnyi sportyvnyi kompleks «Chaika»), is a motorsport racetrack in Ukraine, situated in Chaiky village, near the capital city Kyiv. The circuit was built in 1975, when the country was a part of Soviet Union; since the foundation of Fédération Automobile de l'Ukraine (FAU) in 1993, it hosts various regional racing series, such as Ukrainian Touring Championship and Superbike.ua.

Chayka became very popular and known as the best track in USSR due to very fast sectors near the finish line and corners 2-4, that were known as so-called 'ears'. The track was also difficult and dangerous, there was no runoffs, very close barriers, poor quality asphalt and bad landscaping. Chayka also had a shorter layout that cuts off the 'ears' sector, it was only used for testing. During Ukraine's independence the track was partially reconstructed with addition of the new layouts that allowed to host automobile and motorcycle circuit racing, karting, autocross, rallying, drift and drag racing competitions.

== History ==
=== Soviet Union ===
The development of the circuit began in late 60's by Soviet DOSAAF, a society for cooperation with army, aviation and navy, which also built an airfield next to the track, carrying the same name. The configuration was based on various similar tracks of that time, the project was finished in 1971. The construction began in 1973 and finished in several years.

June 27, 1975 circuit saw its first touring races,, which were Ukraine's first national motorsport championship. Later that year the circuit began to host the USSR Circuit Racing Championship, that included formula racing.

In 1976 the first race for 'Kyiv Ring' prize was held, eventually it became an annual event. Also the track began to host the championships of Russia and Belarus. Ukrainian Motorcycle Road Racing Championship eventually moved to Chayka, before the construction of the track it used to be held on a street circuit in Belarus.

In 1977 the circuit hosted its first international series, called Cup of Peace and Friendship becoming the traditional season opener. Also in 1977 Chayka became the final stage for the Rally Russian Winter that started in Russia, went through Belarus and finished in Ukraine.

In 1982-1983 a motorcycle speedway and a karting circuit were added to complex as a second construction phase, the karting pit building eventually became a center for a car tuning and modification community. In 1984 the first international karting race took place on Chayka.

Following the fatal accident of Polish driver Christian Grochowski in 1983 it was decided to exclude Chayka from the Socialist Countries Cup, Soviet championship round also got cancelled that season.

Without the international races organization quality declined, the races were rare and usually had a small amount of spectators due to lack of advertising. There were several attempts to fix the road, but they've made the situation even worse, the track now obviously consisted of three different types of asphalt.

26 April 1986, the same day Chernobyl disaster happened, Chayka was hosting Ukrainian Circuit Racing Championship.

In 1989 it was planned to invite an Austrian company to hold a reconstruction of the complex to raise the level of the track and to attract more tourists, but financial situation prevented this from happening.

August 18, 1991 Chayka hosted the last race of the USSR Circuit Racing Championship. At the time Ukrainian drivers were already using the blue-and-yellow national symbolic that used to be banned.

=== Independent Ukraine ===
After the dissolution of the USSR in 1991, DOSAAF property had been inherited by the Defense Assistance Society of Ukraine, this included the Chayka's airfield and racetrack. Due to a lack of funds, some infrastructure and equipment was sold to private owners.

In 1993 Fédération Automobile de l'Ukraine was founded, taking over the organization of Ukrainian Circuit Racing Championship. For a long time Chayka was the only venue of the series but since 1995 FAU began to add street circuits from various Ukrainian cities to the calendar in order to give it some variety.

In 1995 and 1996 Chayka served as a closing stage for Rally Kyiv that was Slavutych automobile club and was a part of Ukrainian Rally Championship.

Even with the money from the events the complex still couldn't afford a repavment of the roads that kept deteriorating making the track fall behind the FIA safety standards. FAU was finding a way to keep Chayka in the calendar, reclassifying it as a street circuit to ease the requirements, but simultaneously they were looking for its replacement. In 1996 Kyiv City Automobile and Motorcycle Club (KMAMK) recently founded by racer Serhiy Malyk tried hosting a race at the cloverleaf interchange of Kyiv's newly-built Osokorky district but the racers didn't like its repetitive layout. Chayka hosted races for two more years until its state forced it out of the domestic calendar in 1998. The championship would return to Kyiv in 2001 when Malyk would reach a deal with Olimpiyskyi sports complex to pave a temporary circuit around the football stadium.

After Chayka's exclusion from the championship, local driver, champion of the USSR and Ukraine, Leonid Protasov became its director, he initiated the construction of a better fencing around the complex to prevent vandalism and refused selling track's territory to construction companies.

For 1999–2005 Chayka became a part of Ukrainian Rally Championship once again as a stage of Rally Stolytsia (Rally Capital) organized by Malyk's KMAMK.

In 1999–2001, the Ukrainian Karting Federation reconstructed the karting circuit, it was renamed to KartTochka (Kart Point) and began to host Ukraine Series Karting and offer rental karts.

In 2000 the circuit began to host Ukrainian Motorcycle Road Racing Championship organized by Motorcycle Sports Federation of Ukraine.

After NSC Olimpiyskyi sold parts of its land, including the temporary racetrack, to private owners in 2003 Ukrainian Circuit Racing Championship and its promoter KMAMK ended up with no circuits available. Serhiy Malyk and Leonid Protasov agreed to rebuild it ahead of a planned 2004 season. Due to the cable works taking longer than expected, the championship would only resume in 2005. The circuit got shortened, leaving only the 'ears section', whilst rest became a stage for Chayka mini rally. The short ring was opened 8 July 2005, after the end of reconstruction Chayka has abandoned the Soviet term 'motorsport complex' in favor of European 'autodrome'.

In 2005 Chayka hosted the finale of Ukraine's first drag racing championship, since then former pit straight of the old circuit had been repurposed as a drag strip.

Since the formation of Ukrainian Drift Federation in 2007 Chayka began to host drift events.

Throughout 2007–2012 Chayka hosted several Russian spec-series sanctioned as a national cups by RAF.

In 2009 a new pitlane was paved. In 2012 boxes and bleachers for spectators were built around it.

In 2014, following the fatal crash of Ukrainian football player Andriy Husin, who crashed into a guardrail on a motorcycle track day, most of the barriers were dismantled to provide a place for runoff.

In 2016 the race control building was reconstructed to include a place for podium celebrations while newly formed time attack event organizers began to use alternative short layouts including reverse ones. Also that year KartTochka was renamed to Chayka Karting, next year its boxes were expanded.

In 2018 the former speedway track was reconstructed by Chayka Driving School that has been using the facility for drift learning and competitions.

22 August 2021 National Association of Road Workers of Ukraine (NADU) organized the NADU Racing Games at Chayka, which included an air show, a drift show, a stunt show, a drift taxi, a cheerleader show, children area, simracing area, road equipment exhibition and Ukraine's first ever rally cross competition. Professional circuit racers were competing for teams representing the NADU member companies.

During the Russian invasion of Ukraine the village of Chaiky was attacked on 3 March 2022. Speedway stadium and karting pit building got severely damaged, as well as warehouse facilities around the track.

In 2023 Ministry of Youth and Sports allowed to resume the national championships. The first competitions to return to Chayka were superbike racing and karting. In 2024 the first automobile circuit racing training since the beginning of the war took place at Chayka, it almost got cancelled after track's tarmac got damaged in a recent mass attack by Russia.

1 August 2025 a repaved part of the final corner was opened as Chayka Drift Spot. The festival included a concert of Druha Rika, Kola and Marta Adamchuk, DJ sets, Stance Meet, food courts, motorcycle show, drift taxi and a round of OpenDrift.ua competition.

== Fatalities ==
June 7, 1983, during the Formula Easter race, Estonian driver Toomas Napa who was leading the race driving an Estonia-21 collided with a lapped Metalex of Polish driver Christian Grochowski. Both cars collided with a trackside guardrail and while Napa hurt his leg but was able to get out, Grochowski got stuck inside the car that was leaking fuel that was starting to ignite. Another Polish driver Hieronim Kochański stopped his car to undo his seatbelts but nobody helped him because militsiya prohibited spectators to jump over the barrier and marshalls yelled him to run away from the fire. Coach of USSR national racing team Yuriy Andreev, who was in charge of race direction, was afraid to stop the race because the senior management of DOSAAF was present, so it continued under the yellow flags. A truck full of fire extinguishers was parked nearby but none of them worked and since the drivers were prohibited to stop, the firetruck was only able to enter the track after the race was finished. Grochowski was transported to a hospital that was supposed to specialize on burns but in fact it didn't have proper equipment and the driver died the same day.

The next year Russian driver Sergey Ledovskoy was testing his new Estonia-20 at the track to prepare for the sixth round of Soviet Formula 3. While driving, his leg slipped off the pedal resulting in fracture. He was transported to a hospital but didn't receive a medical help in time becoming circuit's second fatality.

17 September 2014 during a track day for motorcycles Ukrainian football player Andriy Husin hit a trackside barrier, fell down dying instantly.

19 July 2025 during the training for a superbike race, racer of The Riders team Artem Taranenko was killed in a fatal crash. SBKUA organizer Daryna Aleksandrova expressed her condolonces to his family and stated that the event was held in accordance to all safety standards and the crash was an accident that nobody can be blamed in. Following the tragedy, second and third rounds of the championship were cancelled.
