= Madis Laiv =

Estonian racing driver

- Nationality: (Estonia) Estonian
- Born: 1 June 1937 (age 89) Tartu, Estonia

Championship titles
- 1975: Cup of Peace and Friendship

Madis Laiv (born 1 June 1937) is a retired Estonian racecar driver.

He began his racing career in 1958. In 1963, he won the Soviet Formula 3 Championship, and in 1964, he won the Soviet Formula 4 Championship. He also won the Soviet Formula 1 Championship in 1971, and in 1972 and 1975, he won the Formula 2 title. His career highlight was winning the Cup of Peace and Friendship in 1975.

== Titles ==
- Cup of Peace and Friendship

Champion: 1975

- Soviet Formula 1 Championship

Champion: 1971

- Soviet Formula 2 Championship

Champion: 1972, 1975

- Soviet Formula 3 Championship

Champion: 1963

- Soviet Formula 4 Championship

Champion: 1964

- Soviet Formula 5 Championship

Champion: 1968

- Estonian Formula 1 Championship

Champion: 1971

- Estonian Formula 2 Championship

Champion: 1975

- Estonian Formula 3 Championship

Champion: 1962, 1963, 1970

== Results ==
=== Soviet Formula 1 Championship ===
Year	Team	Car	1	2	3	DC	Points
1971	Kalev Tallinn	Estonia 16-M	MIM; 1	BIK; 4	PIR; 1	1st	266

=== Soviet Formula 3 Championship ===
Year	Team	Car	1	2	DC	Points
1963	Kalev Tallinn	Estonia 3	MIM; 1	NEM; 3	1st	14
