= Hubáček =

Hubáček (feminine: Hubáčková) is a Czech surname. It was derived from the old Czech word huba (meaning 'lips') and most likely originated from the prominent lips of the surname's bearer. Notable people with the surname include:

- Alenka Hubacek (born 1990), Australian tennis player
- Anna Hubáčková (born 1957), Czech politician
- David Hubáček (born 1977), Czech footballer
- Ida Hubáčková (born 1954), Czech field hockey player
- Karel Hubáček (1924–2011), Czech architect
- Petr Hubáček (born 1979), Czech ice hockey player
- Vladimír Hubáček (1932–2021), Czech rally driver
