= Toivo Asmer =

Estonian racing driver, motorsports promoter, musician and politician (born 1947)

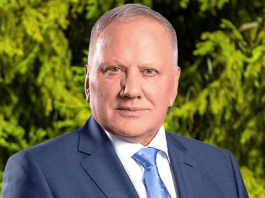
Toivo Asmer

Toivo Asmer (born 8 January 1947) is an Estonian entrepreneur, former racing driver, motorsports promoter, musician and politician. From 1999 until 2003, he was Minister of Regional Affairs of the Republic of Estonia. He was a member of IX Riigikogu. His son is racing driver Marko Asmer.

== Early life and education ==
Asmer was born in Oisu, Järva County. He graduated in 1965 as a technologist at Tallinn Technical School of Construction and Mechanical Engineering (now Tallinn University of Applied Sciences). He received his higher political education from the Marxism–Leninism University of the CC of the ECP, which he graduated from in 1980. He has received further training in economics and business in Luxembourg, Stockholm, and Brussels.

== Work ==
- 1971–1991 Deputy head of the Tallinn corporation of Estonian Agricultural Machinery in the field of road transport
- 1991–1999 Chairman of the Management Board of AS Asmer
- 1993–1996 Vice-Chairman of Saue City Council
- 1993–1996 President of the Estonian Karting Association
- 1995–2003 Member of the Board of the Reform Party
- 1996–1997 Chairman of the Management Board of AS Asmer Auto
- 1999–1999 Member of the Estonian Parliament ( Riigikogu )
- 1999–2003 Minister of Regional Affairs of the Republic of Estonia
- 1999-2003 Chairman of the Committee of Granting Support from Gambling Tax
- 1999–2001 Chairman of the Supervisory Board of the Regional Development Foundation
- 2001–2003 Chairman of the Supervisory Board of the Enterprise Estonia
- 2002–2003 Chairman of the Supervisory Board of the Rural Development Foundation
- 2003–2005 Member of the Supervisory Board of AS Eesti Loto
- 2003–2021 Member of the Management Board of OÜ Eleven Est
- 2009–2020 Member of the Management Board of OÜ Italcar
- 2010–... Member of the Management Board of OÜ Rengton
- 2009–... Deputy Chairman of the Board of Advisors of TTK University of Applied Sciences
- 2011–2014 President of the Estonian Karting Association
- 2012–2020 Member of the Board of the Estonian Autosport Union
- 2015–2019 Member of the Management Board of AS Timber
- 2018–2019 Member of the board of MTÜ Suur Võidusõit
- 2019–... Chairman of the Supervisory Board of AS Timber
- 2020–... Member of the Estonian Olympic Committee
- 2021–... President of the Estonian Autosport Union

== Sports career ==
From 1963, Toivo Asmer was involved in motorsports. In 1964 he became the Estonian youth champion in motorcycle hippodrome racing and in 1965 in motocross. In 1970 he became the Estonian adult champion in winter cross and was named a champion racer. He has won many more silver and bronze medals on motocross and road racing at the Estonian Championship. In 1973, Asmer switched to autosport, racing in various formula classes. He started in Formula 4 class, then Formula Eastern, and ended his autosport career in Formula 3 class. From 1979 to 1990, he was a member of the Soviet Union formula team, winning two silver medals at the Eastern European Championships. He is a six-time champion of the USSR, winning 6 gold medals, 5 silver medals, and 4 bronze medals from the USSR championship. Asmer is also a ten-time Estonian champion. In 1985, he became an Autosport Grand Master. Asmer ended his career as a racer in 1992.

== Results ==
=== Soviet Formula 3 Championship ===
Year	Team	Car	1	2	3	DC	Points
1979	Jõud Tallinn	Estonia 19	CHA; 5	BIK; Ret	RUS; 2	3rd	155
1980	Jõud Tallinn	Estonia 20	RUS; Ret	CHA; 2	BIK; 1	1st	189

== Politics ==
Toivo Asmer has been a member of the Reform Party since 1994. From 1999 to 2003, he was Minister of Regional Affairs in the government of Mart Laar and in the government of Siim Kallas.

== AS Asmer Auto ==
AS Asmer Auto was established in 1995 as a sales representative of Italian cars in Estonia. The company marketed Fiat, Alfa Romeo, and Lancia vehicles, and a nationwide maintenance and repair network was established. A few years later, AS Fakto, which sells Nissans, acquired 100% of the shares of Fiat importer Asmer Auto through an exchange of shares, also starting to control the sale of Fiat vehicles in Estonia. Asmer Auto acquired a share in Public Limited Company Fakto.

== Music ==
Toivo Asmer played bass guitar in the Tallinn ensemble Siirius in 1966–1968 and was also a vocal soloist. From 1969 he played bass guitar and sang for a few years in the Keila ensemble Õnnelemb and later for a short time in the ensemble Baltika. Asmer later returned to music, in 2006, he sang his first CD, "Teine pool." For Mother's Day 2013, the second CD, "Päikest" was completed in the record factory in cooperation with Peeter Kaljuste. The songs "Soov" and "Päikest" on this album quickly became the most popular songs on many radio stations. For Christmas, the album "Koduküla jõulud" was released, with songs together with Merle Lilje, Peeter Kaljuste, and RAM's Lõbusate Poiste Bänd. However, the greatest recognition in music came in March 2014, when he was awarded the Male Artist of the Year award at the Estonian Pop Music Gold Record 2014 awards gala. In December 2015, Toivo's third CD, "Sind ma leian ..." and in cooperation with Merle Lilje and Peeter Kaljuste, a CD with Christmas songs "3 purjelaeva" was released. For the Christmas of the Year 2018, the album of 3 CDs, "Las mööduvad aastad" was completed with Toivo in the series "Estonian Gold." This is a summary of previous music performances, and the album is composed of Asmer's most popular songs, featuring Merle Lilje, Peeter Kaljuste, and Kuldar Kalluste.

== Personal ==
Toivo Asmer is married to Kristel Asmer. He is the father of five children, his son Marko Asmer is a well-known formula driver. Urmas Ott wrote in 2007 a book: "Asmerid. Topeltpeeglis" (The Asmers. In double mirror) about Toivo and Marko Asmer. Toivo Asmer's hobbies are classical music, theater, and cinema. He speaks English, Russian, and Finnish.
