= Soviet Formula 3 Championship =

Former Single-Seater Motor Racing Championship

- Category: Single seaters
- Country: Soviet Union
- Inaugural season: 1960
- Folded: 1987
- Last Drivers' champion: (Estonian Soviet Socialist Republic) Toomas Napa
- Last Teams' champion: (Estonian Soviet Socialist Republic) DOSAAF Tallinn

Soviet Formula 3 Championship was Formula 3 series held in the Soviet Union in the years 1960 to 1987.

In October 1956, the Central Automobile Club of the Soviet Union (CAMK) became a member of the FIA. As a result, CAMK representatives watched western races, including the Formula One British Grand Prix. As a result of this, it was decided to create Soviet motor sports, creating the Soviet Union championship in several racing classes, including Formula 3.

The series was cancelled because of the collapse of the Soviet Union and replaced with Russian Formula 3 series.

== Champions ==
Season
Season	Driver	Team	Car
1960	(Soviet Union) Georgy Surguchev	(Soviet Union) Trud Moskwa	NAMI 041M - IMZ
1961	(Estonian Soviet Socialist Republic) Ants Seiler	(Estonian Soviet Socialist Republic) Kalev Tallinn	Estonia 3 - IMZ
1962	(Soviet Union) Yuri Bugrov	(Soviet Union) DOSAAF Leningrad	Estonia 3 - IMZ
1963	(Estonian Soviet Socialist Republic) Madis Laiv	(Estonian Soviet Socialist Republic) Kalev Tallinn	Estonia 3 - IMZ
1964	(Soviet Union) Vladimir Ptushkin	(Soviet Union) Spartak Moscow	Melkus 63 - Wartburg
1965	(Soviet Union) Georgy Surguchev	(Soviet Union) Trud Moskwa	Melkus 64 - Wartburg
1966	(Soviet Union) Viktor Lapin	(Soviet Union) DOSAAF Moscow	Melkus 64 - Wartburg
1967	(Soviet Union) Vladimir Grekov	(Soviet Union) Spartak Krasnodar	Melkus 64 - Wartburg
1968	(Estonian Soviet Socialist Republic) Enn Griffel	(Estonian Soviet Socialist Republic) Kalev Tallinn	Estonia 9 - Wartburg
1969	(Estonian Soviet Socialist Republic) Enn Griffel	(Estonian Soviet Socialist Republic) Kalev Tallinn	Estonia 9 - Wartburg
1970	(Soviet Union) Vladimir Grekov	(Soviet Union) Spartak Krasnodar	Estonia 9 - Wartburg
1971	(Estonian Soviet Socialist Republic) Enn Griffel	(Estonian Soviet Socialist Republic) Kalev Tallinn	Estonia 9 - Wartburg
1972	(Estonian Soviet Socialist Republic) Enn Griffel	(Estonian Soviet Socialist Republic) Kalev Tallinn	Estonia 9 - Wartburg
1973	(Soviet Union) Yuri Andreev	(Soviet Union) DOSAAF Moscow	Estonia 18 - Lada
1974	(Soviet Union) Wladislav Barkowski	(Soviet Union) Spartak Moscow	Estonia 18 - Lada
1975	(Estonian Soviet Socialist Republic) Enn Griffel	(Estonian Soviet Socialist Republic) Kalev Tallinn	Estonia 19 - Lada
1976	(Soviet Union) Wladislav Barkowski	(Soviet Union) Spartak Moscow	Estonia 18 - Lada
1977	(Soviet Union) Mikhail Lvov	(Soviet Union) Spartak Leningrad	Estonia-18M - Lada
1978	(Soviet Union) Mark Balezin	(Soviet Union) DOSAAF Moscow	Estonia-18M - Lada
1979	(Soviet Union) Viktor Klimanov	(Soviet Union) Spartak Moscow	Estonia 19 - Lada
1980	(Estonian Soviet Socialist Republic) Toivo Asmer	(Estonian Soviet Socialist Republic) Jõud Tallinn	Estonia 20 - Lada
1981	(Soviet Union) Viktor Klimanov	(Soviet Union) Spartak Moscow	Estonia 19 - Lada
1982	(Estonian Soviet Socialist Republic) Toomas Napa	(Estonian Soviet Socialist Republic) Jõud Tallinn	Estonia 20 - Lada
1983	(Estonian Soviet Socialist Republic) Toomas Napa	(Estonian Soviet Socialist Republic) Jõud Tallinn	Estonia-21M - Lada
1984	(Estonian Soviet Socialist Republic) Toomas Napa	(Estonian Soviet Socialist Republic) Jõud Tallinn	Estonia-21M - Lada
1985	(Estonian Soviet Socialist Republic) Toomas Napa	(Estonian Soviet Socialist Republic) Jõud Tallinn	Estonia-21M - Lada
1986	(Soviet Union) Alexander Potekhin	(Soviet Union) DOSAAF Moscow	Estonia 20 - Lada
1987	(Estonian Soviet Socialist Republic) Toomas Napa	(Estonian Soviet Socialist Republic) DOSAAF Tallinn	Estonia-21M - Lada

== Titles by driver ==
Driver	Titles
(Estonian Soviet Socialist Republic) Enn Griffel	5
(Estonian Soviet Socialist Republic) Toomas Napa	5
(Soviet Union) Georgy Surguchev	2
(Soviet Union) Vladimir Grekov	2
(Soviet Union) Wladislav Barkowski	2
(Soviet Union) Viktor Klimanov	2
(Estonian Soviet Socialist Republic) Ants Seiler	1
(Soviet Union) Yuri Bugrov	1
(Estonian Soviet Socialist Republic) Madis Laiv	1
(Soviet Union) Viktor Lapin	1
(Soviet Union) Yuri Andreev	1
(Soviet Union) Mikhail Lvov	1
(Soviet Union) Mark Balezin	1
(Estonian Soviet Socialist Republic) Toivo Asmer	1
(Soviet Union) Alexander Potekhin	1

== See also ==
- Russian Formula Three Championship
- Cup of Peace and Friendship
- Soviet Formula 2 Championship
