= Soviet Formula 2 Championship =

Former Single-Seater Motor Racing Championship

- Category: Single seaters
- Country: Soviet Union
- Inaugural season: 1962
- Folded: 1975
- Last Drivers' champion: (Estonian Soviet Socialist Republic) Madis Laiv
- Last Teams' champion: (Estonian Soviet Socialist Republic) Kalev Tallinn

Soviet Formula 2 Championship was Formula 2 series held in the Soviet Union in the years 1962 to 1975 for eastern bloc drivers.

== Champions ==
Season
Season	Driver	Team	Car
1962	(Soviet Union) Yuri Vishniakov	(Soviet Union) Spartak Leningrad	ASK - GAZ
1963 – 1970	Championship was not held		
1971	(Soviet Union) Vladimir Grekov	(Soviet Union) Spartak Krasnodar	Estonia 16-M - Wartburg
1972	(Estonian Soviet Socialist Republic) Madis Laiv	(Estonian Soviet Socialist Republic) Kalev Tallinn	Estonia 16-M - Moskvitch
1974	(Soviet Union) Vladimir Grekov	(Soviet Union) Spartak Krasnodar	Estonia-18M - Lada
1975	(Estonian Soviet Socialist Republic) Madis Laiv	(Estonian Soviet Socialist Republic) Kalev Tallinn	Estonia 16-M - Lada

== Titles by driver ==
Driver	Titles
(Soviet Union) Vladimir Grekov	2
(Estonian Soviet Socialist Republic) Madis Laiv	2
(Soviet Union) Yuri Vishniakov	1

== See also ==
- Russian Formula Three Championship
- Cup of Peace and Friendship
- Soviet Formula 3 Championship
