= Estonian Autosport Union =

Organization based in Estonia

- Sport: Motorsport
- Jurisdiction: Estonia
- Abbreviation: EAU
- Founded: 1999
- Affiliation: FIA
- Headquarters: Peetri
- President: Toivo Asmer

Official website
- uus.autosport.ee
- (Estonia)

Estonian Autosport Union (abbreviated EAU; Estonian: Eesti Autospordi Liit) is one of the sport governing bodies in Estonia which deals the with Estonian autosport.

EAU is one of the organizers of the Estonian Rally Championship and Estonian Grand Prix. This union is a member of the Fédération Internationale de l'Automobile (FIA). Estonian Autosport Union is responsible for organizing the Team Autosport Estonia national team, which competes in different motorsports series, including the FIA Motorsport Games.

== Results ==
=== FIA Motorsport Games Rally Cup ===
Season	Team	Car	Drivers	Points	D.C.
2022	Team Estonia	Volkswagen Polo GTI R5	(Estonia) Georg Linnamäe	N/A	3rd

== See also ==
- List of FIA member organisations
