= Cup of Peace and Friendship =

Eastern European auto racing event (1963–1990)

- Category: Formula racing (1963-1989); Touring car racing (1973-1989)
- Region: Eastern Bloc
- Inaugural season: 1963
- Folded: 1990
- Last Drivers' champion: (Soviet Union) Alexandr Potekhin (Czechoslovakia) Josef Michl

The Cup of Peace and Friendship (also Friendship Cup of Socialist Countries) was an auto racing championship series dedicated to Eastern Bloc drivers between 1963 and 1990.

== History ==
The Cup of Peace and Friendship was created in 1963 as an initiative of Lech Tulak and Jerzy Jankowski of the Polish Automobile and Motorcycle Federation. The main purpose of the cup was to promote standard regulations for auto racing in Eastern Bloc countries. In its initial form it was a championship for open-wheel, single seaters and included both individual and national team awards. Heinz Melkus and East Germany were the first champions.

For the inaugural season in 1963, cup races were held to Formula Junior, before its replacement by the new 1-litre Formula Three from 1964. 1972 saw the creation of Formula Easter, which would form the technical basis of the championship for the next seventeen years, before switching to Formula Mondial for the final two seasons in 1989 and 1990. From 1973 a touring car class was also introduced.

After the revolutions of 1989, the championship was made open to western entrants, but mounting financial difficulties made 1990 the final season of the Cup of Peace and Friendship.

== Champions ==
	Single seater				Touring car		
Season	Category	Champion driver	Car	Champion Nation	Champion Driver	Car	Champion Nation
1963	Formula Junior	(East Germany) Heinz Melkus	Melkus 63-Wartburg	East Germany	not held	not held	not held
1964	Formula 3	(Poland) Jerzy Jankowski	Rak 64-Wartburg	East Germany	not held	not held	not held
1965	Formula 3	(East Germany) Heinz Melkus	Melkus 65-Wartburg	East Germany	not held	not held	not held
1966	Formula 3	(East Germany) Heinz Melkus	Melkus 65-Wartburg	East Germany	not held	not held	not held
1967	Formula 3	(East Germany) Heinz Melkus	Melkus 65-Wartburg	East Germany	not held	not held	not held
1968	Formula 3	(Czechoslovakia) Miroslav Fousek	Škoda F3	Czechoslovakia	not held	not held	not held
1969	Formula 3	(Czechoslovakia) Vladimír Hubáček	Lotus 41C-Cosworth	Czechoslovakia	not held	not held	not held
1970	Formula 3	(Czechoslovakia) Vladislav Ondřejík	Lotus 41C-Cosworth	Czechoslovakia	not held	not held	not held
1971	Formula 3	(East Germany) Klaus-Peter Krause	SEG-Wartburg	East Germany	not held	not held	not held
1972	Formula Easter	(East Germany) Heinz Melkus	Melkus 71-Wartburg	Czechoslovakia	not held	not held	not held
1973	Formula Easter	(Czechoslovakia) Albín Patlejch	MTX 1107-Škoda	East Germany	(Poland) Andrzej Wojciechowski	Polski Fiat 125p	Czechoslovakia
1974	Formula Easter	(Czechoslovakia) Karel Jílek	MTX 1-02-Škoda	Czechoslovakia	(Czechoslovakia) Jaroslav Bobek	Škoda 120S	Czechoslovakia
1975	Formula Easter	(Soviet Union) Madis Laiv	Estonia 18-VAZ	Soviet Union	(Czechoslovakia) Milan Žid	Škoda 130RS	Czechoslovakia
1976	Formula Easter	(Czechoslovakia) Jiří Červa	MTX 1-03-VAZ	Czechoslovakia	(Czechoslovakia) Milan Žid	Škoda 130RS	Czechoslovakia
1977	Formula Easter	(Czechoslovakia) Karel Jílek	MTX 1-03-VAZ	Czechoslovakia	(Czechoslovakia) Oldřich Brunclik	Škoda 130RS	Czechoslovakia
1978	Formula Easter	(East Germany) Ulli Melkus	SRG MT77-VAZ	East Germany	(Czechoslovakia) Vlastimil Tomášek	Škoda 130RS	Soviet Union
1979	Formula Easter	(Czechoslovakia) Václav Lim	Avia AE2-VAZ	Czechoslovakia	(Czechoslovakia) Vlastimil Tomášek	VAZ-2101	Czechoslovakia
1980	Formula Easter	(East Germany) Ulli Melkus	SRG MT77-VAZ	Czechoslovakia	(Czechoslovakia) Miroslav Heřman	VAZ-2101	Czechoslovakia
1981	Formula Easter	(Czechoslovakia) Jiří Moskal	MTX 1-03-VAZ	East Germany	(Czechoslovakia) Petr Samohýl	Škoda 120	Soviet Union
1982	Formula Easter	(Czechoslovakia) Jan Veselý	RAF 80-VAZ	Czechoslovakia	(Czechoslovakia) Vlastimil Tomášek	VAZ-2101	Czechoslovakia
1983	Formula Easter	(East Germany) Ulli Melkus	SRG MT77-VAZ	East Germany	(Soviet Union) Alexey Grigoriev	VAZ-2101	Soviet Union
1984	Formula Easter	(East Germany) Ulli Melkus	SRG MT77-VAZ	East Germany	(Czechoslovakia) Vlastimil Tomášek	VAZ-2101	Czechoslovakia
1985	Formula Easter	(East Germany) Ulli Melkus	SRG MT77-VAZ	Czechoslovakia	(Czechoslovakia) Vlastimil Tomášek	VAZ-2101	Czechoslovakia
1986	Formula Easter	(Czechoslovakia) Václav Lim	Avia AE3-VAZ	East Germany	(Czechoslovakia) Vlastimil Tomášek	Skoda 130LR	Czechoslovakia
1987	Formula Easter	(Soviet Union) Toomas Napa	Estonia 21M-VAZ	Soviet Union	(Czechoslovakia) Petr Bold	VAZ-2105	Soviet Union
1988	Formula Easter	(Soviet Union) Viktor Kozankov	Estonia 21.10-VAZ	Soviet Union	(Soviet Union) Alexey Grigoriev	VAZ-2105	Soviet Union
1989	Formula Mondial	(Soviet Union) Viktor Kozankov	Estonia 21.10-VAZ	Soviet Union	(Soviet Union) Yuri Katsai	VAZ-2108	Soviet Union
1990	Formula Mondial	(Soviet Union) Alexandr Potekhin	Estonia 21.10-VAZ	not held	(Czechoslovakia) Josef Michl	Škoda 136L	not held

== Circuits ==
Circuit	Location	Years
(People's Republic of Bulgaria) Albena Circuit	Albena	1977-1987
(Czechoslovak Socialist Republic) Brno Circuit	Brno	1963-1965, 1967
(Czechoslovak Socialist Republic) Strahov Circuit	Prague	1966
(Czechoslovak Socialist Republic) Štramberk Circuit	Štramberk	1968
(Czechoslovak Socialist Republic) Havířov-Šenov	Havířov	1969-1970, 1976, 1981, 1983, 1990
(Czechoslovak Socialist Republic) Most Street Circuit	Most	1972-1980, 1982
(Czechoslovak Socialist Republic) Autodrom Most	Most	1984-1986, 1988
(East Germany) Sachsenring	Hohenstein-Ernstthal	1963-1965, 1973-1974
(East Germany) Schleizer Dreieck	Schleiz	1966, 1970-1990
(East Germany) Autobahnspinne Dresden	Dresden	1967, 1969
(Hungarian People's Republic) Pécs Circuit	Pécs	1964
(Hungarian People's Republic) Ferihegy	Budapest	1965-1966
(Hungarian People's Republic) Győr Circuit	Győr	1967
(Hungarian People's Republic) Hungaroring	Mogyoród	1986-1987
(Polish People's Republic) Gliwice Circuit	Gliwice	1963
(Polish People's Republic) Kraków-Rakowice-Czyżyny Airport	Kraków	1964, 1967
(Polish People's Republic) Warsaw Babice Airport	Warsaw	1965-1966
(Polish People's Republic) Magnolia Circuit	Szczecin	1968-1970
(Polish People's Republic) Toruń Airport	Toruń	1973-1980
(Polish People's Republic) Tor Kielce	Kielce	1981-1982, 1984
(Polish People's Republic) Poznań Circuit	Poznań	1983, 1985-1987, 1989-1990
(Socialist Republic of Romania) Reșița Circuit	Reșița	1984, 1986, 1988-1989
(Socialist Republic of Romania) Galați Circuit	Galați	1985
(Soviet Union) Borovaya Circuit	Minsk	1963, 1969-1977
(Soviet Union) Neva Ring	Leningrad	1966
(Soviet Union) Biķernieki Circuit	Riga	1968, 1984-1986, 1988-1990
(Soviet Union) Chayka Motorsports Complex	Kiev	1978-1983
