= Miroslav Fousek =

- Born: 23 June 1923
- Died: 22 August 1993 (aged 70); Mladá Boleslav, Czech Republic
- Occupation(s): Formula 3 driver, racecar driver

Miroslav Fousek (23 June 1923 – 22 August 1993) was a Czech racecar driver who raced the Škoda 1100 OHC.

== Life ==
Fousek was born on 23 June 1923. For almost 50 years, he worked in the Škoda Auto factory in Mladá Boleslav. He died on 22 August 1993 in Mladá Boleslav.

== Career ==
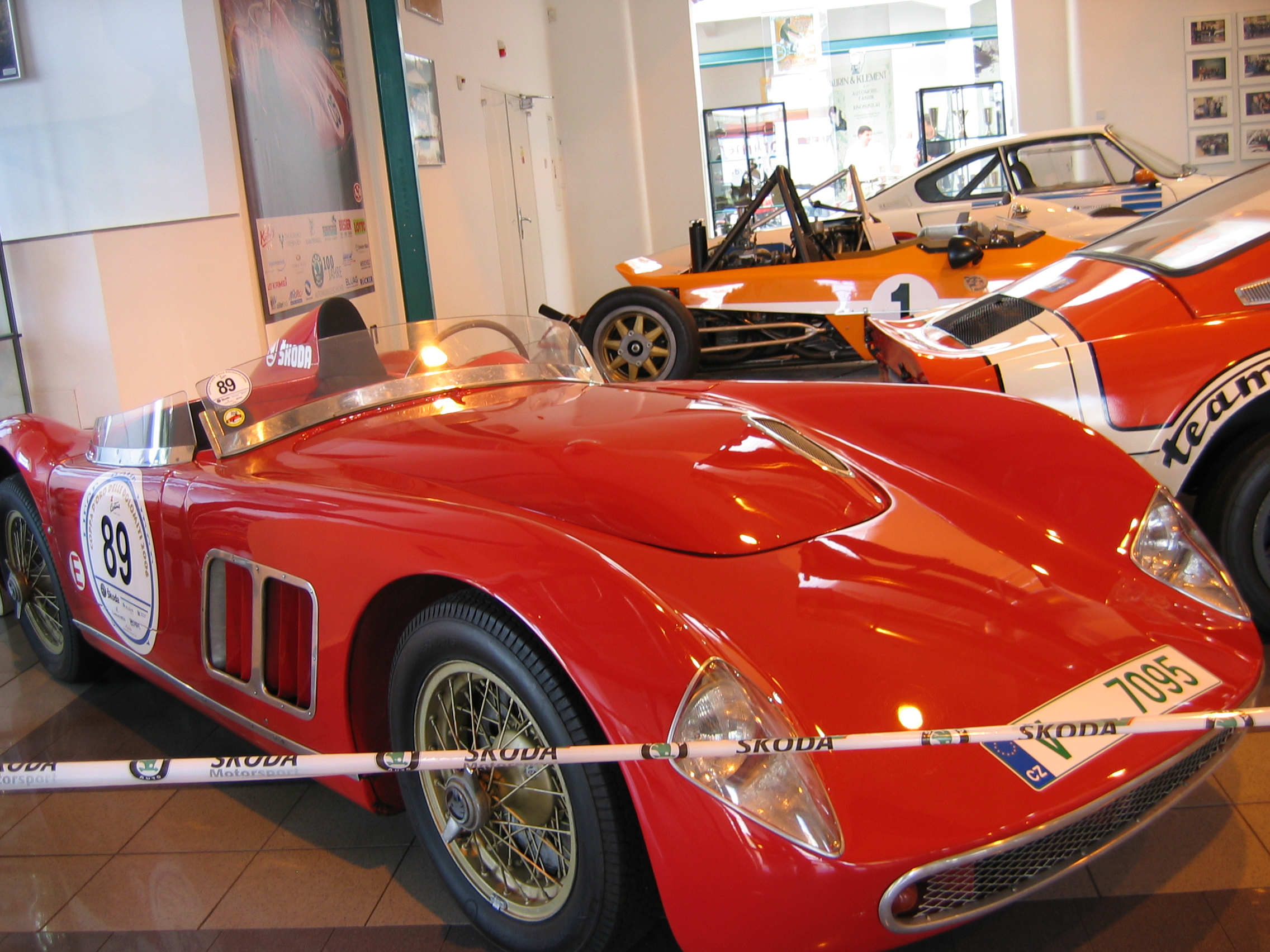
The Škoda 1100 OHC in the Škoda Museum

=== Championships ===
Fousek won multiple championships including the 1968 Cup of Peace and Friendship, and the Eastern European Formula 3 Championship also in 1968.

=== Škoda 1100 OHC ===
During several races Fousek drove the Škoda 1100 OHC, a specialty racecar designed by Škoda specifically for Fousek, which he debuted in Mladá Boleslav in 1958 winning the race.
