= Škoda 1100 OHC =

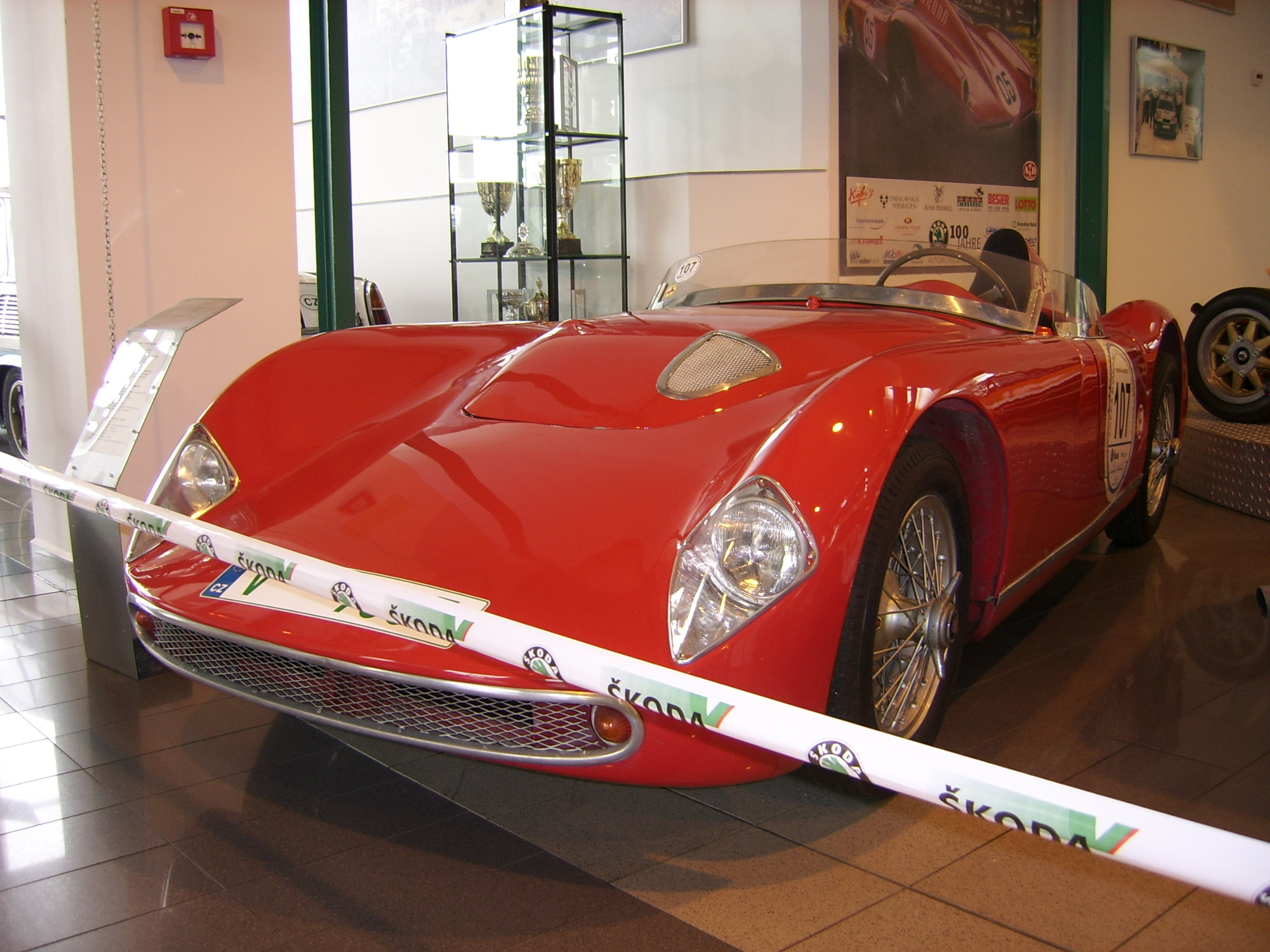
- Škoda 1100 OHC roadster in Škoda Museum

Overview
- Manufacturer: AZNP
- Production: 1957–1960
- Assembly: Czechoslovakia

Body and chassis
- Class: Sports car
- Body style: 2-door roadster
- Layout: FR layout

Powertrain
- Engine: 1.1 L I4
- Transmission: 4-speed manual

Dimensions
- Length: 3,880 mm (152.8 in)
- Width: 1,430 mm (56.3 in)
- Height: 980 mm (38.6 in)

Chronology
- Predecessor: Škoda Sport
- Successor: Škoda 1100 GT

The Škoda 1100 OHC (type 968) is a two-seat sports car, derived from the Škoda 1101 "Tudor" and considered the successor to the Škoda Sport. It came out in 1957 and had a plastic or aluminium body.

The water-cooled four-cylinder four-stroke engine had double overhead camshafts, a displacement of 1089 cc and a power output of 67.6 kW (92 hp). As the car only weighed 550 kg (1,213 lb) the car could reach speeds of 190 kilometres per hour (118 mph). The body was of semi-monocoque construction with an additional frame of thin-walled tubes. Only four cars were built, two roadsters with a plastic body, and two coupes with an aluminium body.
