= Rainer Vakra =

Estonian politician (born 1981)

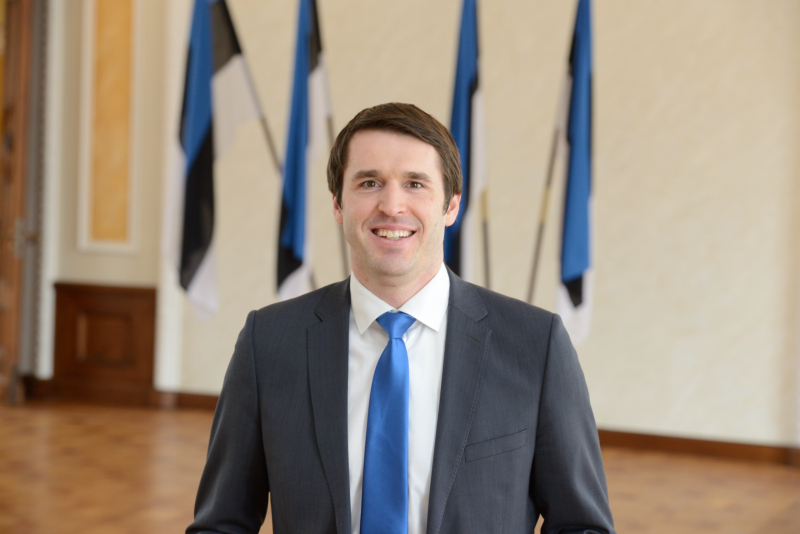

Rainer Vakra (born 10 March 1981 in Tallinn) is an Estonian politician. He was a member of the XII and XIII Riigikogu.

In 2002 he graduated from Tallinn University with a degree in environmental management.

From 2005 to 2011 he was the elder of Nõmme District.

From 2005 to 2012 he was a member of Estonian Centre Party and from 2013 to 2021 he was a member of Estonian Social Democratic Party.

Rainer Vakra's maternal grandfather was racing driver Enn Griffel.
