= Estonia 21 =

Cup of Peace and Friendship series race car

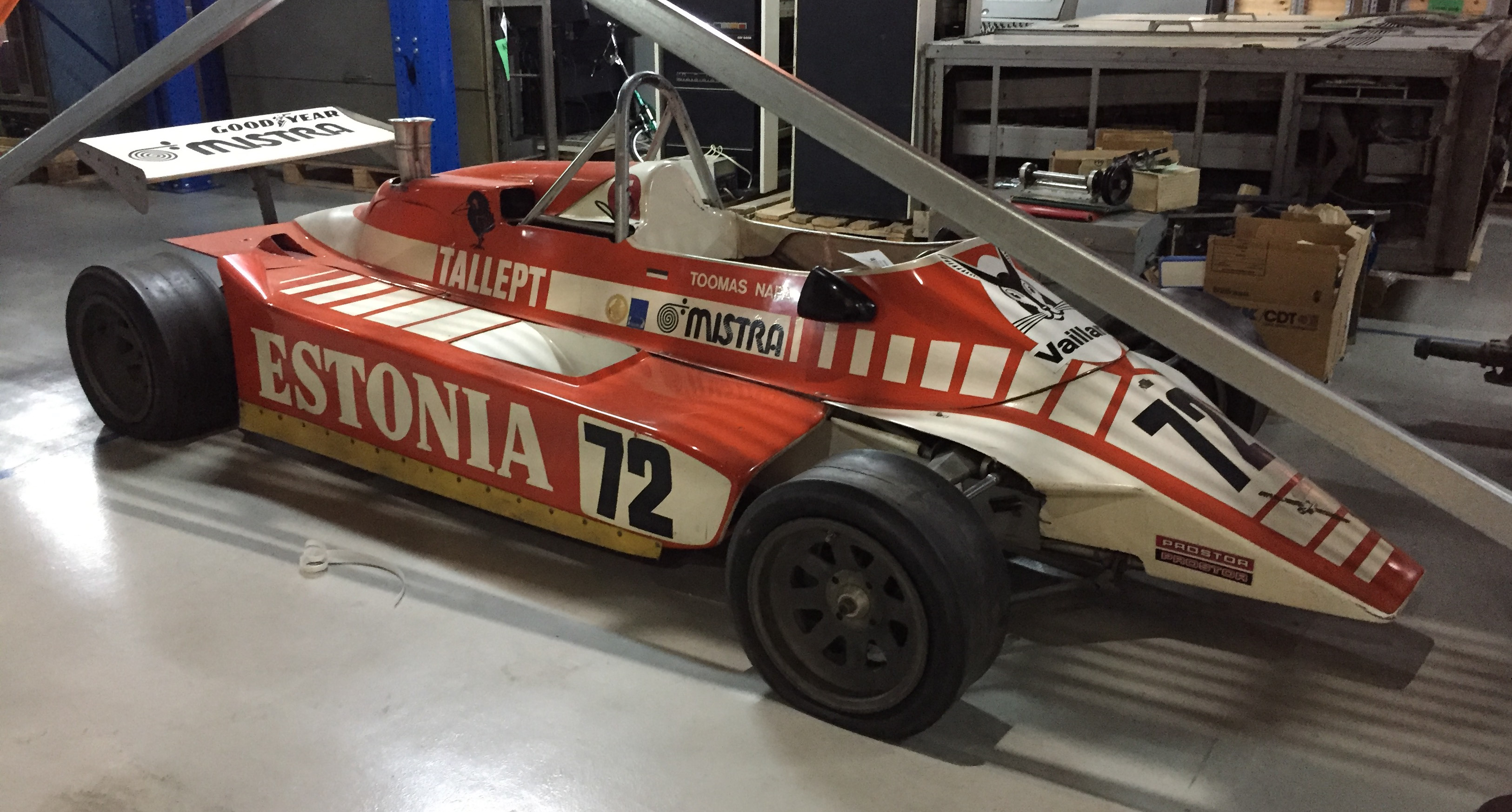
- Estonia 21
- Category: Formula Easter
- Constructor: Tallinna Autode Remondi Katsetehas
- Designer: Raul Sarap
- Predecessor: Estonia-20
- Successor: Estonia-22

Technical specifications
- Chassis: Tube frame
- Wheelbase: 2,400 mm (94 in)
- Engine: AvtoVAZ 1,294 cc (79.0 cu in) straight-four engine
- Transmission: TARK 5-speed + 1 reverse
- Power: 85 hp (63 kW) @ 7,000 rpm 81 pound-feet (110 N⋅m) @ 3,400 rpm
- Weight: 435 kg (959 lb) including driver
- Fuel: Petrol

Competition history
Wins	Podiums	Poles	Titles
3	8	1	1

Estonia 21 is a racing car designed by Raul Sarap and built by Tallinna Autode Remondi Katsetehas. This was one of the most successful Estonia formula car.

The car was inspired by the Lotus 81 and it used ground effect. It was produced in 1981–1991 (since 1985 versions 21-M). The VAZ 2105 engine powered it with a capacity of 1294 cm^{3}. It reached a maximum power of about 85 hp [3] (up to 110 hp in newer versions), which allowed the vehicle to accelerate to 210 km/h. The whole car weighed 435 kg. There were four prototypes built and all in all 295 Estonia 21-M cars.

This car was used in Cup of Peace and Friendship, Soviet Formula 2 and in Soviet Formula 3 series.
