= Škoda F3 =

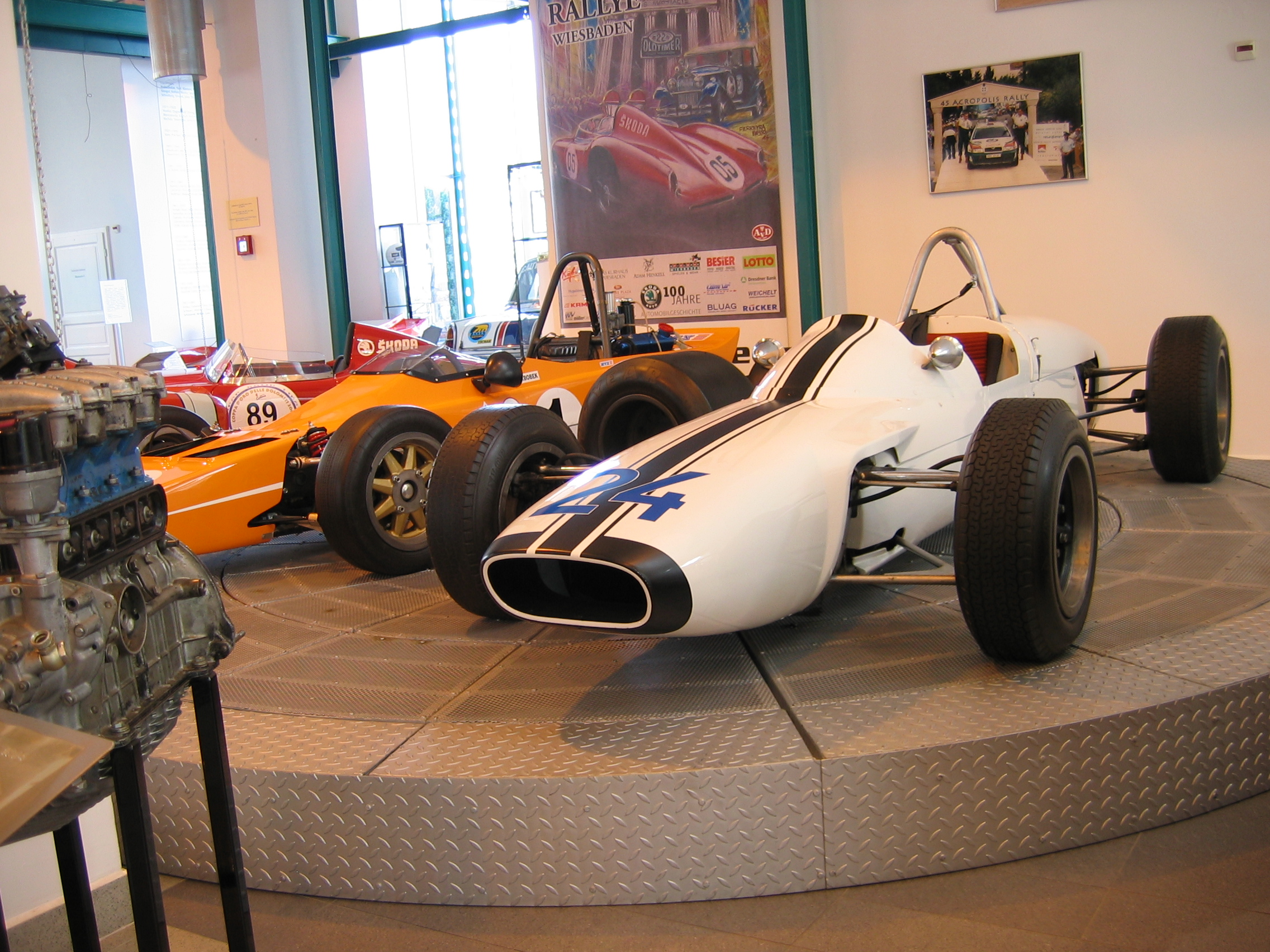
Various models of the F3 in the Škoda Museum, Mladá Boleslav

The Škoda F3 is an open-wheel formula racing car, designed, developed and built by Czech manufacturer Škoda, for both Formula 3 and Formula Junior categories, in 1964.

The water-cooled, top-controlled, four-cylinder, four-stroke in-line engine was installed at the rear and had a displacement of 998 cc or 1221 cc and an output of 76 hp (56 kW). Later, the power was increased to 90 hp (66 kW). He accelerated the 410 kg vehicle up to 210 km/h. The aluminum or plastic body was semi-monocoque with an additional frame made of thin-walled tubes.
