= Vladislav Ondřejík =

Racing driver

- Born: 1 April 1943
- Died: 10 July 1977 (aged 34) Hohenstein-Ernstthal, East Germany

Championship titles
- 1970: Cup of Peace and Friendship

Vladislav Ondřejík (Czech: [ˈvla.ɟɪs.laf ˈon.dr̝ɛj.iːk]; 1 April 1943 – 10 July 1977) was a Czechoslovak racing driver and engineer.

== Biography ==
Ondřejík was born on 1 April 1943, and was a citizen of Czechoslovakia. He began his racing career in 1960, participating in kart racing. In 1965, he debuted in the Czechoslovak Formula Three, in which he was driving Tatra Delfin open-seated car with the engines from Tatra and Škoda cars. Later he competed driving the Lotus 41C with Ford-Cosworth engine, for the Dukla Prague team. In 1969, while racing for Lotus team, he was the second in the Cup of Peace and Friendship. The year later, in 1970, he won the championship of the Cup of Peace and Friendship. He also participated in the touring car racing, driving Škoda 120 S, and Fiat 128 Sport Coupé. Across his career, the newspapers and magazines often reported his name as Vladimír Ondřejík (Czech: [ˈvla.ɟɪ.miːr ˈon.dr̝ɛj.iːk]).

He also worked as an engineer in the Tatra design bureau in Prague, Czechoslovakia. After he stopped working there, he had established his own car tuning company, called Avon.

On 10 July 1977, during the first lap of the race of the East Germany Touring Car Championship, at the Sachsenring race track, in Hohenstein-Ernstthal, East Germany (now in Germany), his Škoda 130 RS had collided with two others cars, and then crashed into a concrete pole. During the crash, Ondřejík had suffered heavy injuries, and had died later in the evening, in the hospital in Hohenstein-Ernstthal. The race was stopped and cancelled immediately following the crash.
