= Schleizer Dreieck =

Motorsports circuit in Schleiz, Germany

- Full Circuit (2004–present)
- Location: Schleiz, Thuringia, Germany
- Coordinates: 50°33′43.2″N 11°49′19.9″E
- Capacity: 10,000
- Opened: 10 June 1923; 102 years ago
- Major events: Former: International Road Racing Championship (2010–2012, 2017, 2023–2025); IDM Superbike Championship (2004–2019, 2021–2025); Sidecar World Championship (2004–2007, 2009–2013); Cup of Peace and Friendship (1970–1990)

Full Circuit (July 2004–present)
- Length: 3.805 km (2.364 mi)
- Turns: 14
- Race lap record: 1:23.849 ( (Ukraine) Illia Mykhalchyk, BMW M1000RR, 2024, SBK)

Modified Circuit (August 1988–June 2004)
- Length: 6.805 km (4.228 mi)
- Turns: 22

Original Circuit (June 1923–May 1988)
- Length: 7.631 km (4.742 mi)
- Turns: 22
- Race lap record: 2:59.200 ( (United Kingdom) Chris Williams, Brabham BT21, 1967, F3)

Schleizer Dreieck is a motorsports circuit located in Schleiz, Thuringia, Germany. It is the oldest racing track in Germany, and it was opened on 10 June 1923.

The circuit's original length was 7.631 km (4.742 mi), it was firstly shortened to 6.805 km (4.228 mi) between May and August 1988, then to 3.805 km (2.364 mi) in July 2004. It has an average width of 10 m (33 ft) and elevation changes of 44 m (144 ft).

The Schleizer Dreieck is mainly used for motorcycle racing events. It mainly hosts events for IDM Superbike Championship, but it also hosted international events, such as Sidecar World Championship and Cup of Peace and Friendship.

== Events ==
Current

- June: 91. Internationales Schleizer Dreieckrennen
- July: German TT, VFV Klassik Grand Prix

Former

- Cup of Peace and Friendship (1970–1990)
- IDM Superbike Championship (2004–2019, 2021–2025)
- International Road Racing Championship (2010–2012, 2017, 2023–2025)
- Sidecar World Championship (2004–2007, 2009–2013)

== Layout history ==
Schleizer Dreieck Layout History
Original Circuit (June 1923–May 1988)

Modified Circuit (August 1988–2003)

Full Circuit (2004–present)

== Lap records ==
As of June 2025, the fastest official race lap records at the Schleizer Dreieck are listed as:

Category	Time	Driver	Vehicle	Event
Full Circuit (2004–present): 3.805 km (2.364 mi)
Superbike	1:23.849	Illia Mykhalchyk	BMW M1000RR	2024 Schleiz IDM Superbike round
Supersport	1:26.707	Dirk Geiger	Honda CBR600RR	2025 Schleiz IDM Supersport round
Sportbike	1:30.951	Iñigo Iglesias Bravo	Triumph Daytona 660	2025 Schleiz IDM Sportbike round
Supersport 300	1:36.179	Max Zachmann	Kawasaki Ninja 400	2023 Schleiz IDM Supersport 300 round
Original Circuit (June 1923–May 1988): 7.631 km (4.742 mi)
Formula Three	2:59.200	Chris Williams	Brabham BT21	1967 Schleizer Dreieckrennen
Formula Junior	3:11.400	Jean-Claude Franck	Cooper T67	1963 Schleizer Dreieckrennen
