= Škoda Sport =

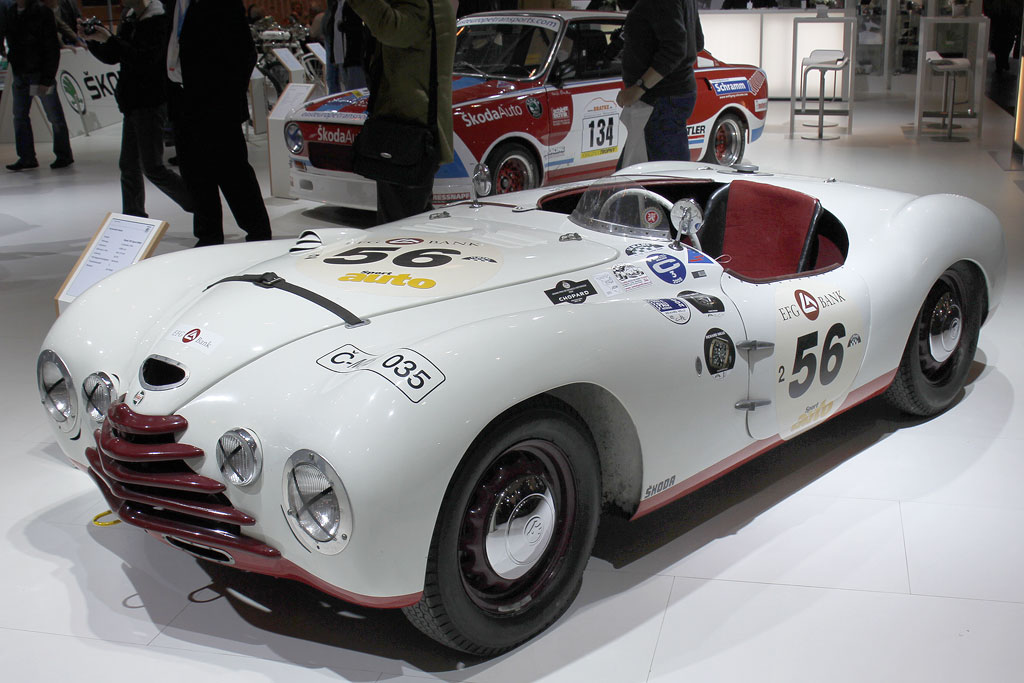
Skoda 1101 Sport (1950)

The Škoda Sport was a sports racing car, designed, developed, and produced by Czechoslovak automobile manufacturer Škoda. The two-seater roadster with aluminum body and pontoon construction was released in 1949.

== Design ==
The car is based on the Škoda 1101 Tudor, introduced in 1946. The body was made by hand from aluminum sheets. The water-cooled, top-controlled four- cylinder - four- stroke - in-line engine with one or two compressors had a displacement of 1089 or 1221 cm³ and an output of 37-66 kW (50-90 hp) in suction mode and 48-132 kW (65-180 hp) in compressor operation. It accelerated the 655-715 kg vehicle up to 140-180 km/h (in suction mode). Via the gearbox flanged to the engine block and a Cardan shaft, with the driving force being transmitted to the rear wheels. The car's skeleton frame, which was forked at the front and rear, consisted of welded steel U-profiles and had a central tube.

At the 24 Hours of Le Mans in 1950, drivers Václav Bobek and Jaroslav Netušil were initially able to keep up well. The usual racing fuel at the time was a mixture of petrol, ethanol, and acetone. The Škoda Sport thus reached a top speed of 140 km/h and achieved an average speed of 126 km/h. In the 13th hour, however, the car had to give up due to a defect.

== Škoda Supersport ==
In 1950 the Škoda Supersport appeared in parallel. This vehicle was designed as a monoposto with free-standing wheels and also had an aluminum body. In addition to the engines mentioned above, a unit with a displacement of 1490 cm³ was used. The engine and driving performance also corresponded to the aforementioned model.

The bodies of both types were refurbished several times and fitted with different engines.
