= Automobile Federation of Ukraine =

Federation Automobile de l'Ukraine
- Автомобільна федерація України
- Sport: Motorsports
- Membership: FIA
- Abbreviation: FAU
- Founded: 2 July 1992; 33 years ago
- Headquarters: Kyiv, Ukraine
- President: Oleksandr Feldman

Official website
- fau.ua
- (Ukraine)

The Automobile Federation of Ukraine (Ukrainian: Автомобільна федерація України) or Federation Automobile de l'Ukraine, shortened as FAU, is an international non-governmental organization that unites citizens for the development and promotion of motor sports, road transport, and tourism in Ukraine. Since 1992 FAU is a member of FIA and a national sports federation of the country since 1998.

== Presidents ==
- Stepan Kravchun (1992–1993)
- Artem Atoyan (1993–1996)
- Valeriy Tsybukh (1996–1999, 1999–2005)
- Yevhen Chervonenko (2005–2008, 2008–2011)
- Bohdan Novytskyi (2011–2013)
- Viktor Yanukovych Jr. (2013–2014)
- Ruslan Tsyplakov (2014–2015, acting)
- Oleksandr Feldman (2015, acting, 2023–present)
- Leonid Kostiuchenko (2015–2019, 2019–2023)
