= MTX (automobile) =

Czech automobile manufacturing company

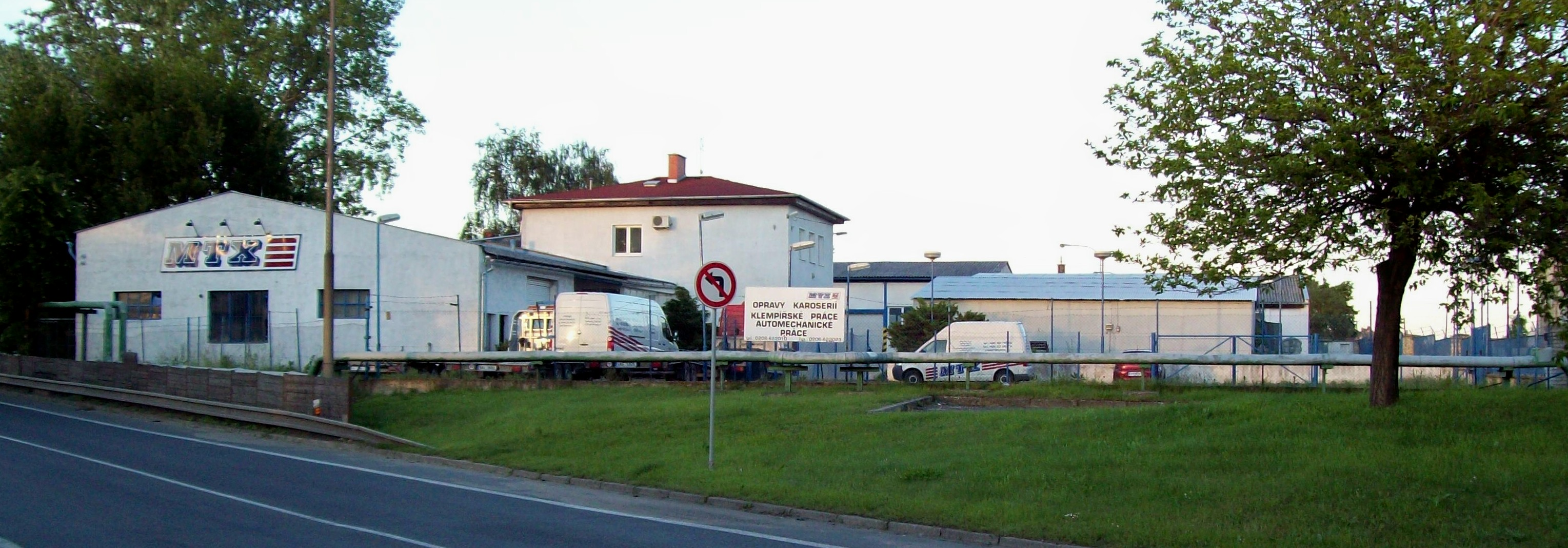
- Founded: 1969
- Headquarters: Prague, Czech Republic
- Website: https://www.mtx.cz/

MTX (short for Metalex) is an automobile company in the Czech Republic, that has been previously in Czechoslovakia engaged in the manufacture of racing and formula cars since 1969. Originally, it was a repair shop for Škoda racers. Currently, MTX is engaged in the development of special vehicle modifications, service activities and veteran renovations. The company now has branches in Prague (headquarters), Plzeň (manufacture) and Mělník (autoservis).

The first single-seater formula car ""MTX 1-01" appeared in 1970. During the 1970s and 1980s, Formula Easter cars, autocross buggies and rally cars (based on Škoda and Lada) were produced. In 1989 and 1990, the Škoda Rapid convertible was made in a few copies in cooperation with the German firm Heinzinger. In the 1990s, the company made MTX Roadster (based on Škoda Favorit) and MTX Cabrio (based on Škoda Felicia). Super-sport model named MTX Tatra V8 was made in 1991. Racing cars from Metalex won 14 international titles and almost 100 titles of national champions.

== Formula cars ==
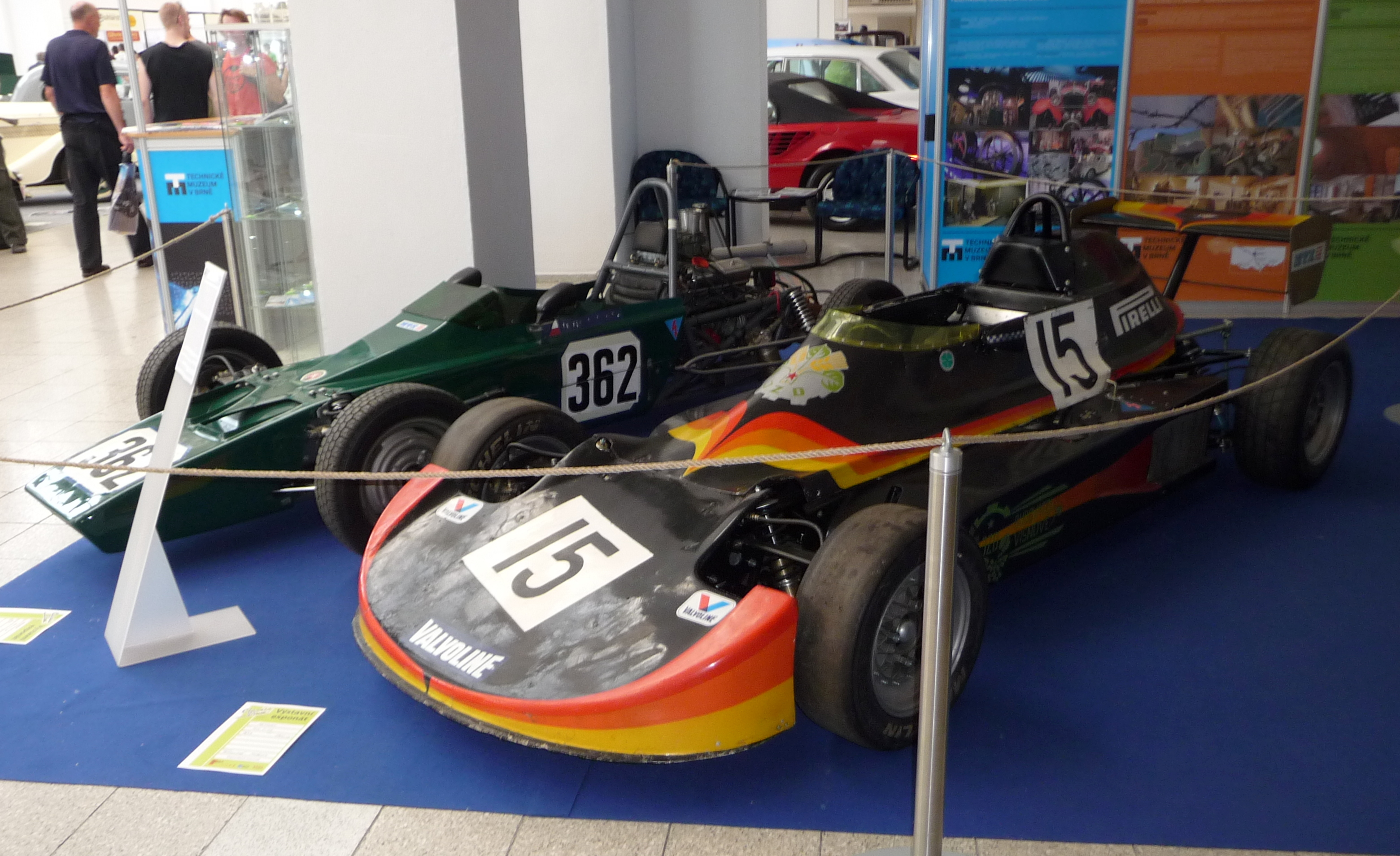
Formula car MTX 1-01 and MTX 1-03

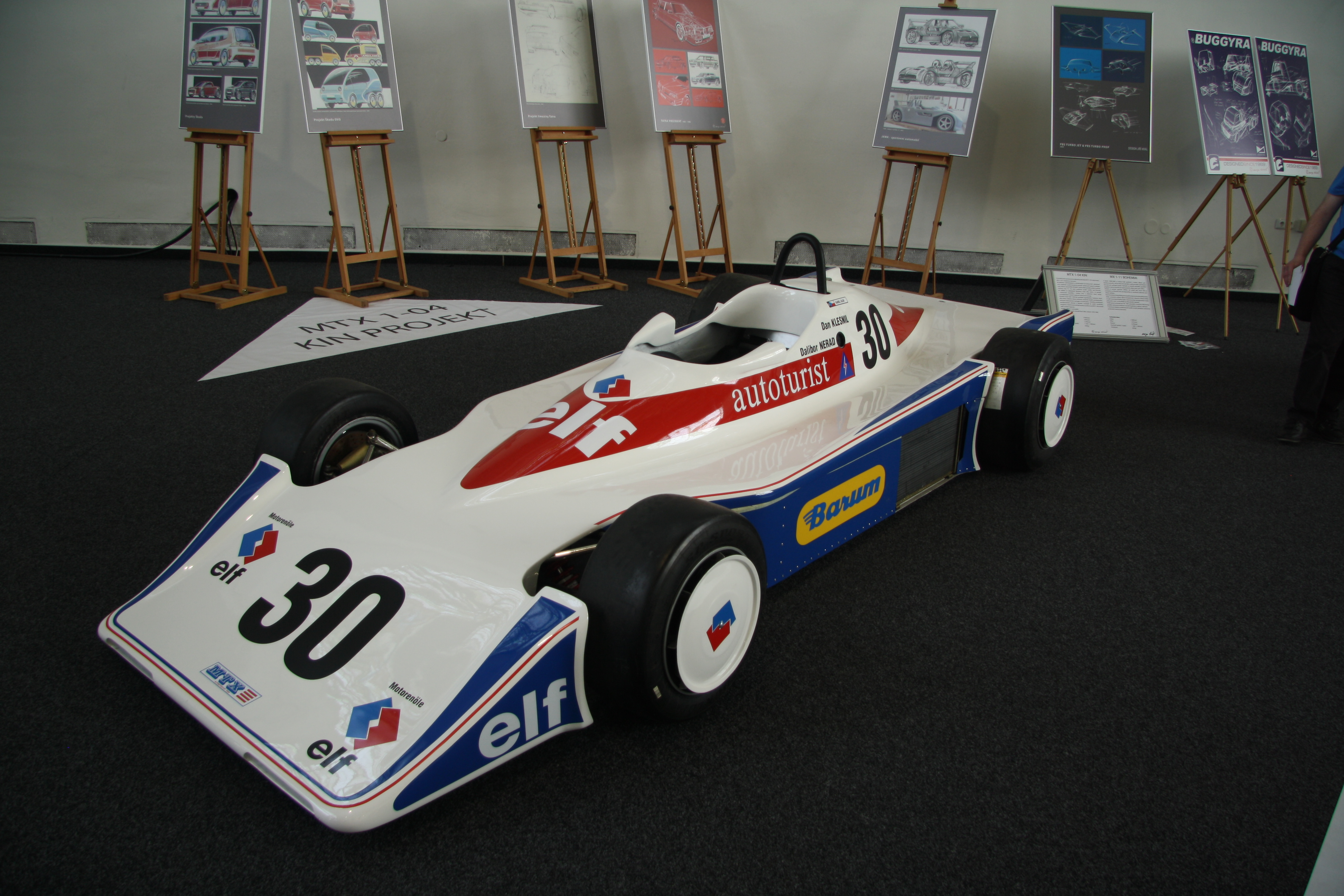
Formula car MTX 1-04

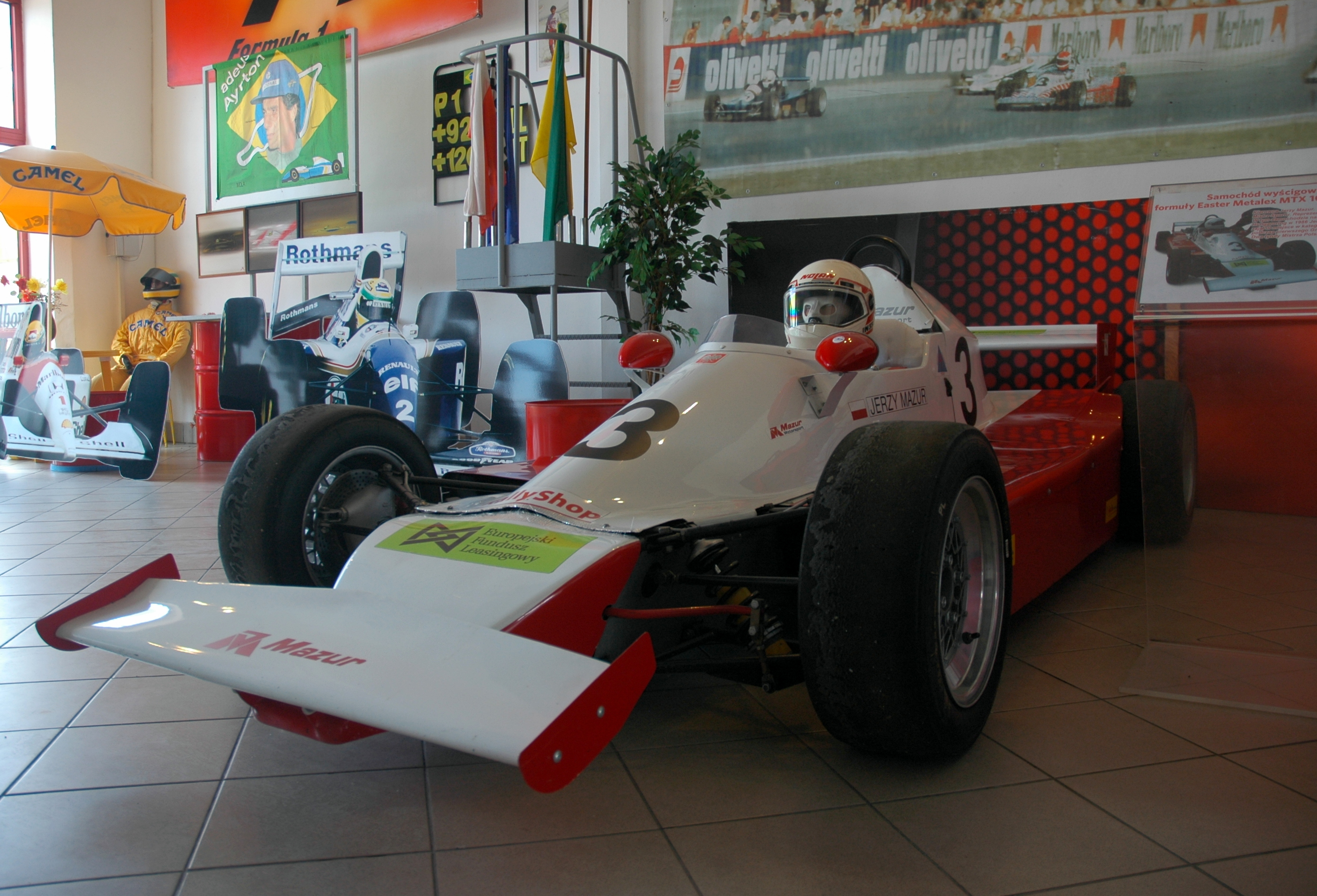
Formula car MTX 1-06

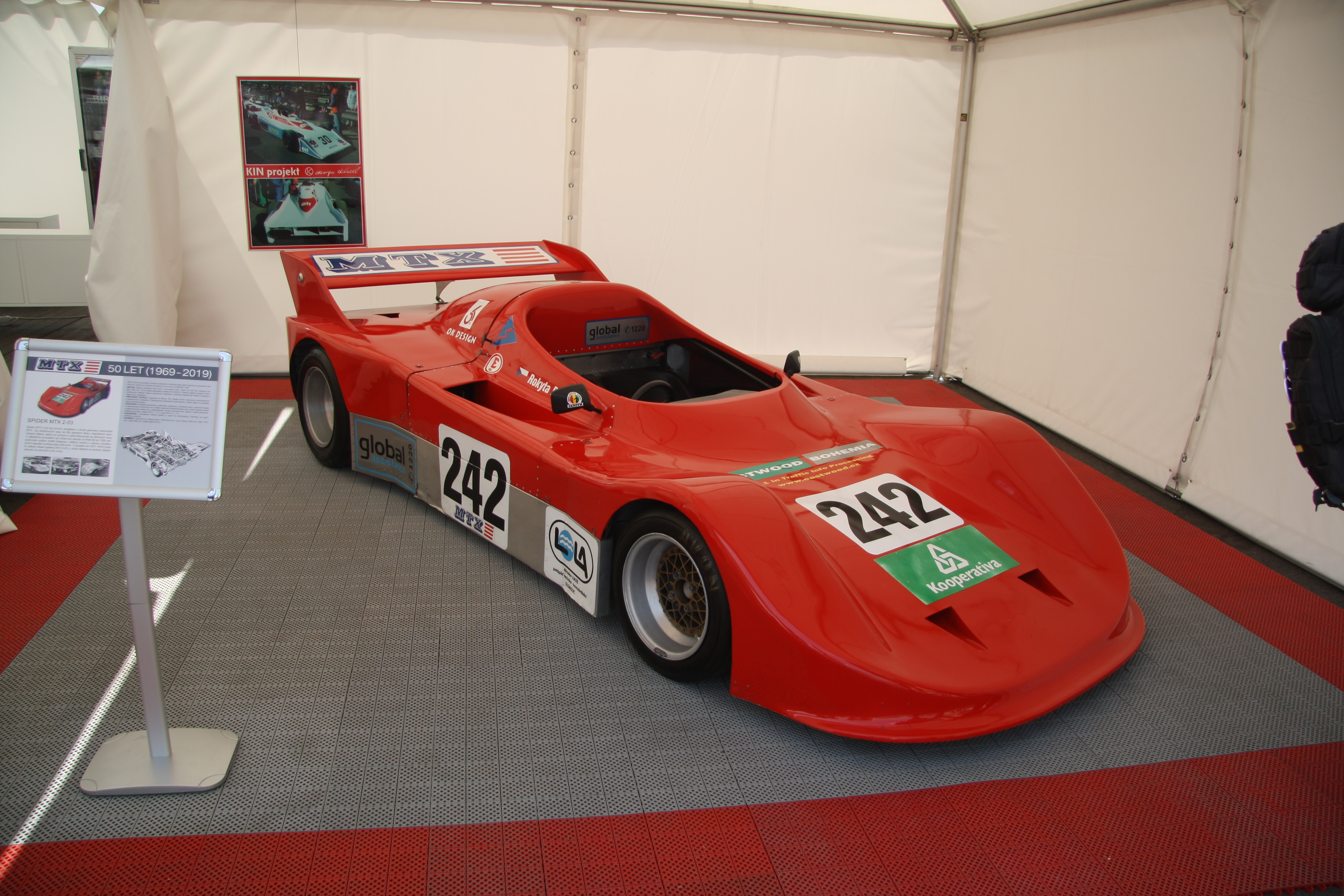
Spider MTX 2-03

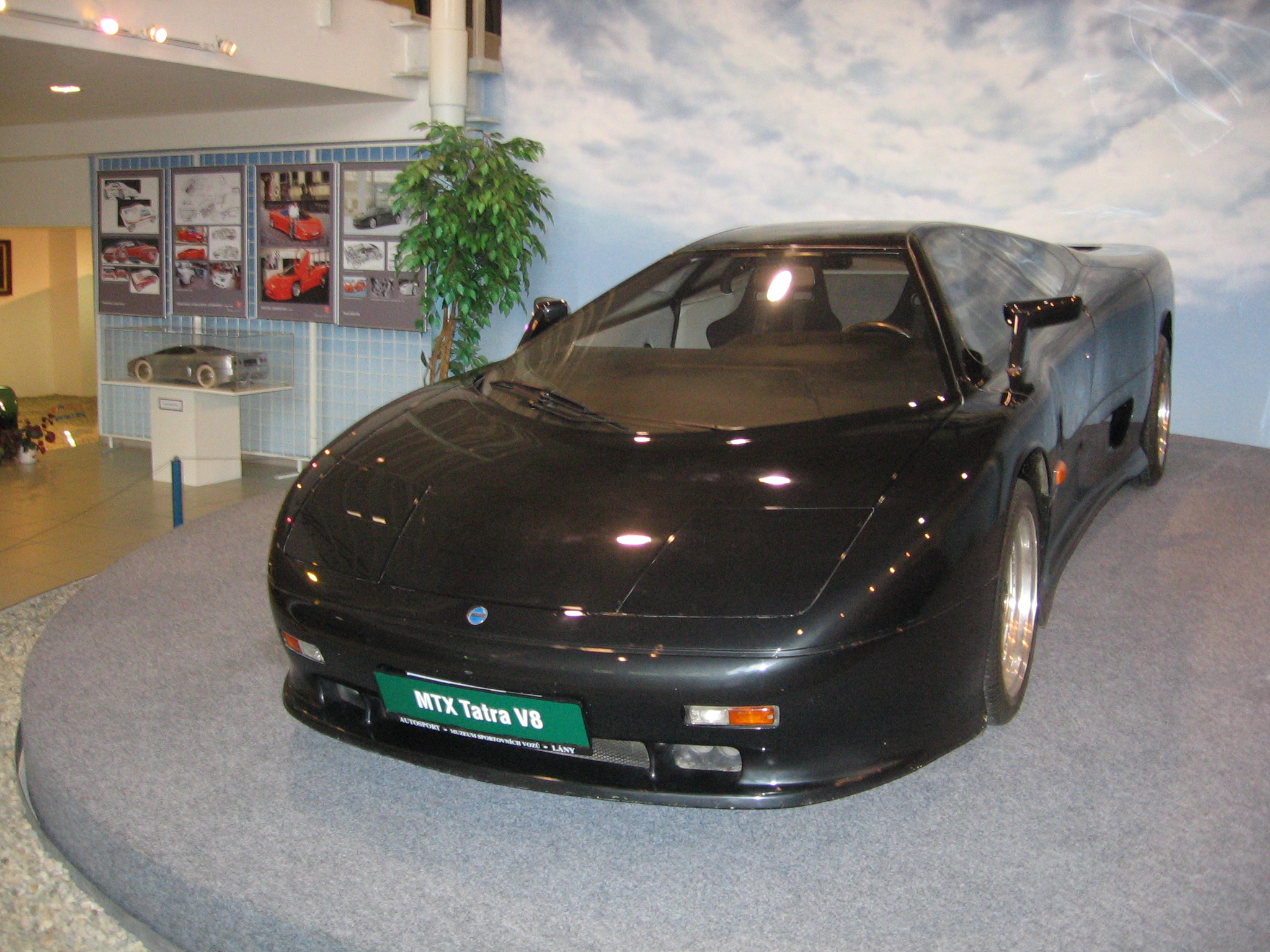
Super-sport MTX Tatra V8

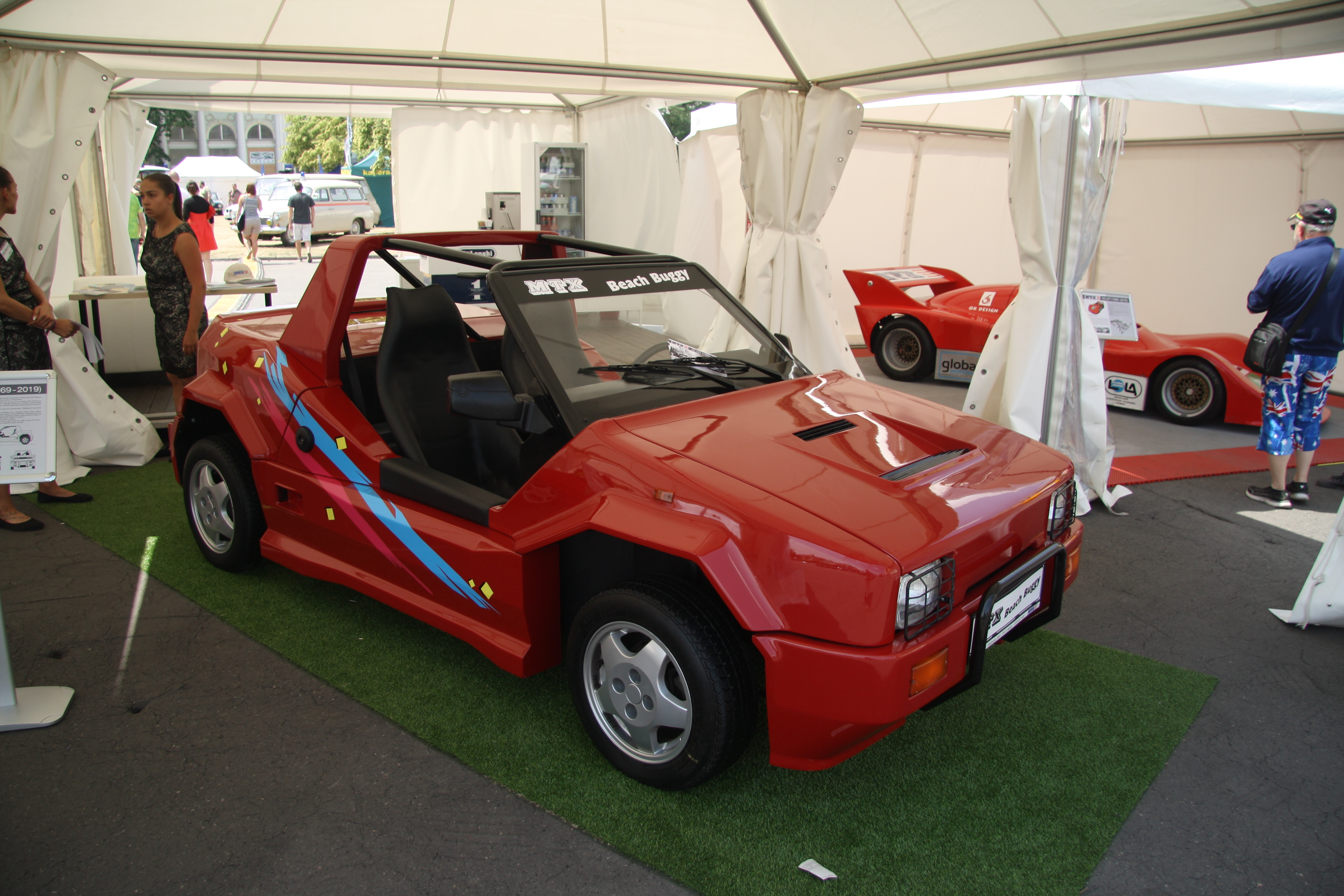
MTX Beach Buggy

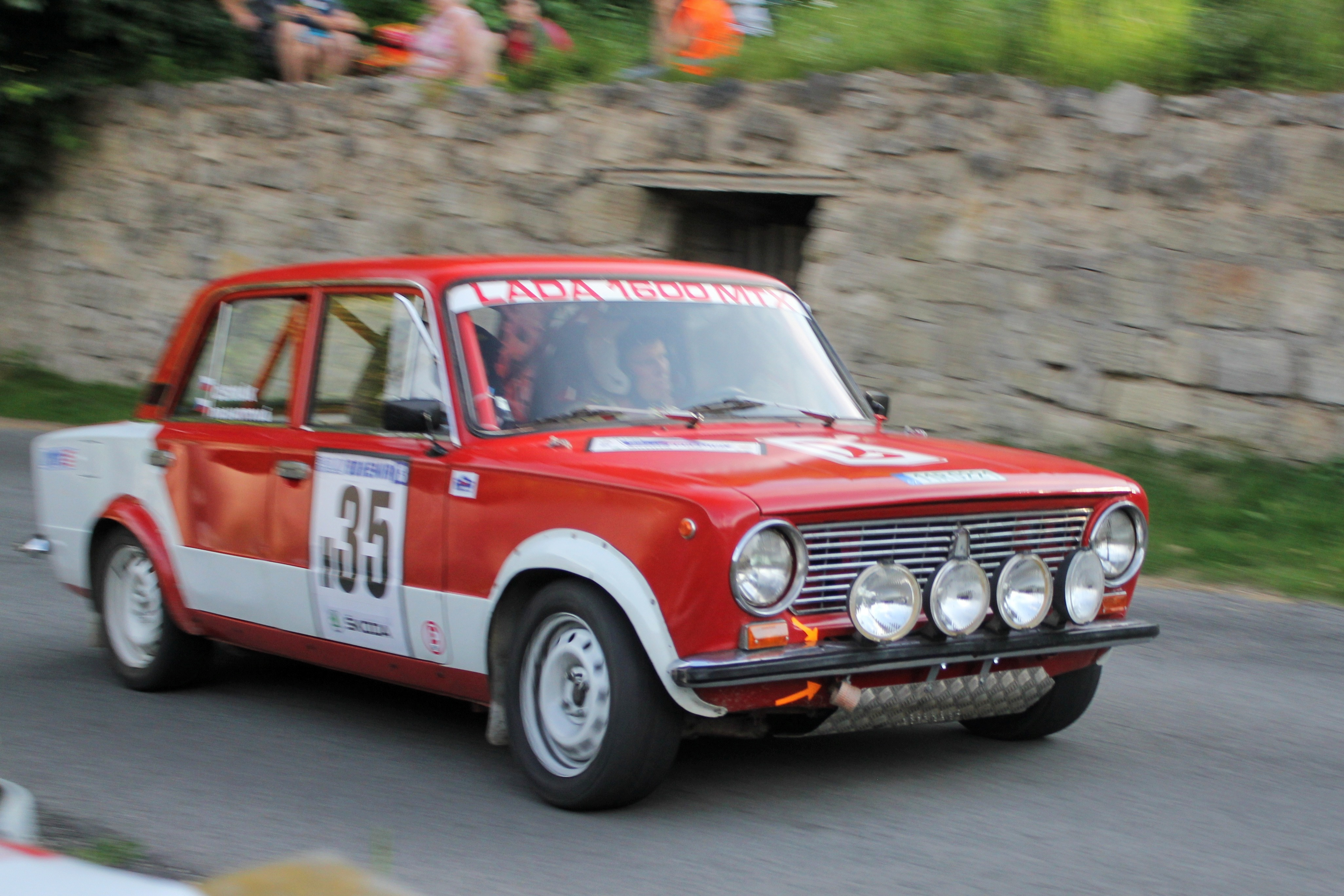
Lada 1600 MTX Rallye

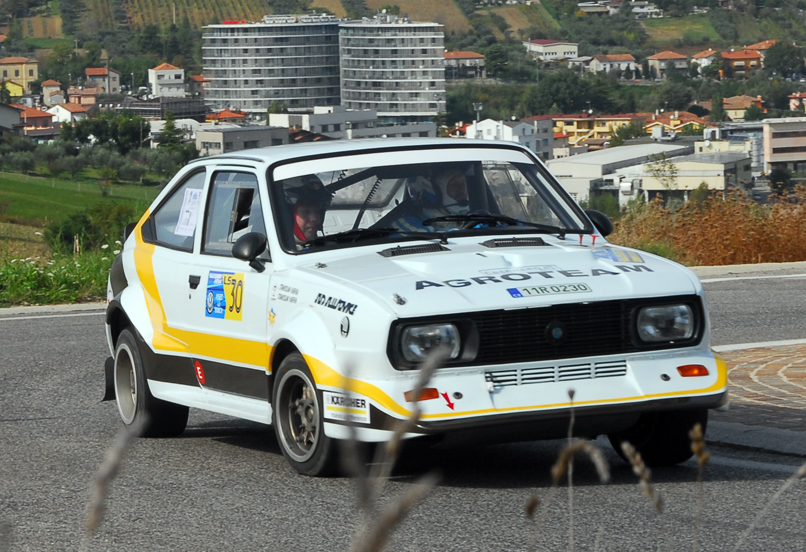
Škoda MTX 160 RS (MTX 6-03)

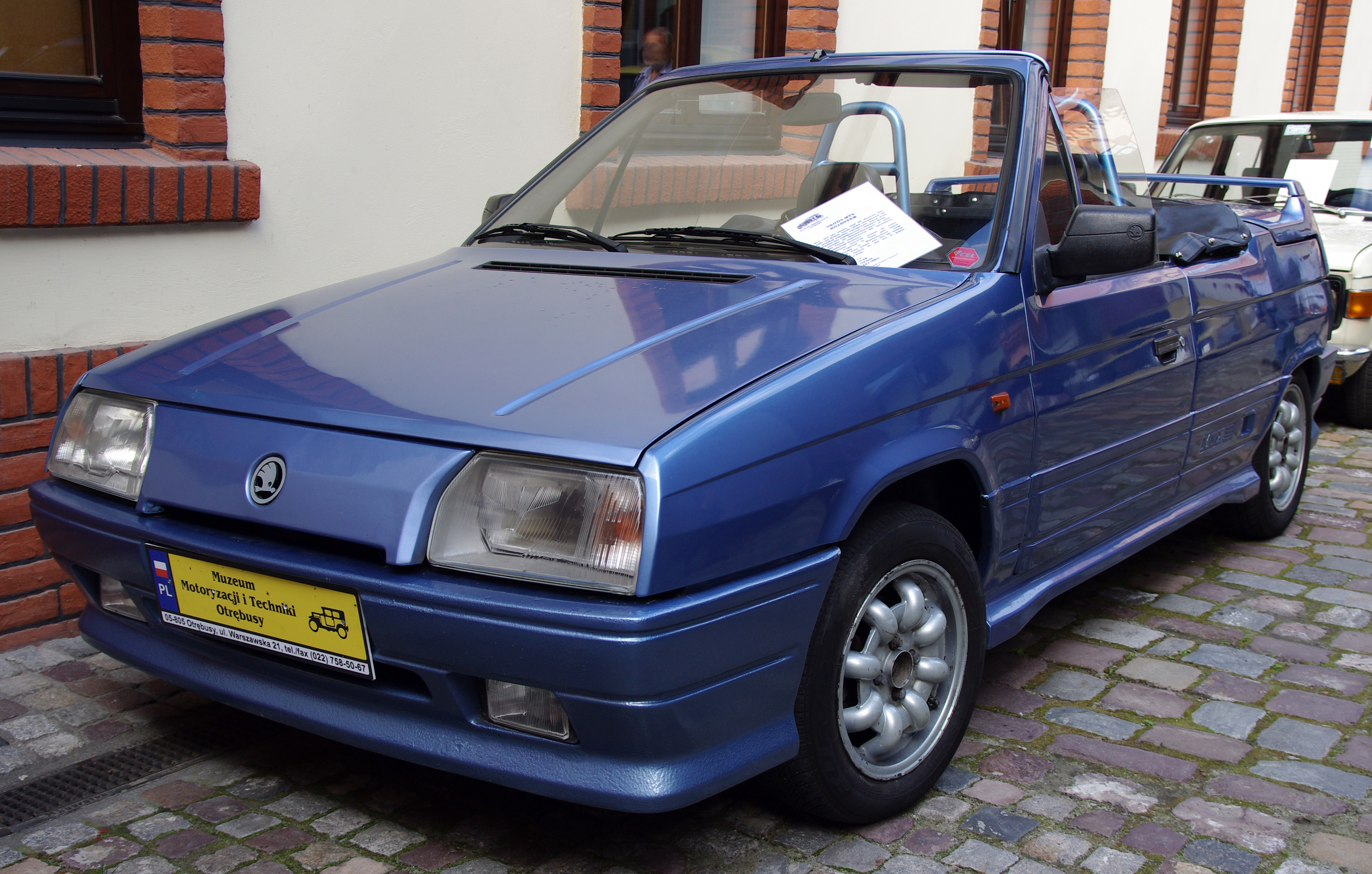
MTX Roadster (MTX 7-06)

- MTX 1-01 formula Škoda (1970-1984, produced 35 vehicles)
- MTX 1-02 formula Easter (1972-1975, produced 25 vehicles)
- MTX 1-03 formula Easter (1975-1981, produced 53 vehicles)
- MTX 1-04 formula Easter (1978, produced 1 vehicle)
- MTX 1-05 formula Škoda (1979-1982, produced 9 vehicles)
- MTX 1-06 formula Easter (1981-1982, produced 21 vehicles)
- MTX 1-06 B formula Mondial (1983-1988, produced 18 vehicles)
- MTX 1-07 formula Škoda (1983, produced 1 vehicle)
- MTX 1-08 formula Mondial (1989, only model 1:5)
- MTX 1-09 formula Ford (1989-1990, produced 2 vehicles)
- MTX 1-10 formula Škoda (1989-1990, produced 3 vehicles)

== Two-seat racing cars ==
- MTX 2-01 spider B5 (1972, produced 3 vehicles)
- MTX 2-03 spider B6 (1977-1979, produced 10 vehicles)
- MTX Tatra V8 super-sport (1991-1993, produced 4 vehicles)

== Road racing motorcycles ==
- MTX 3-01 (1977, produced 25 motorcycles)
- MTX 3-02 (1979, produced 12 motorcycles)
- MTX 3-03 (1982, produced 45 motorcycles)
- MTX 3-04 (1986, produced 45 motorcycles)

== Off-road motorcycles ==
- MTX 4-01 (1985-1987, produced 130 motorcycles)

== Off road buggy cars ==
- MTX 2-01 (MTX Škoda Buggy) autocross, 1970, produced 1 vehicle
- MTX 2-02 autocross, 1973, produced 1 vehicle
- MTX 2-04 autocross, 1988
- MTX 1-13 autocross, produced 1 vehicle
- MTX Beach Buggy autocross, 1995–2002, produced around 100 vehicles

== Touring racing cars ==
- Škoda 1000 MB MTX A2 or B5 racing, 1969, produced 2 vehicles
- VAZ 2101 MTX Racing A2 racing, 1972–1974, produced 3 vehicles
- VAZ 2103 MTX Racing A2 racing, 1975, produced 2 vehicles
- VAZ 21011 MTX AP circuits and hills A racing, 1979–1984, produced 28 vehicles
- MTX 5-01 (Lada 2105 MTX Racing A) circuits and hills A racing, 1985, produced 20 vehicles
- MTX 5-02 (Škoda 130 L MTX Racing A) circuits and hills A racing, 1985, produced 15 vehicles
- MTX 5-03 (Škoda 130 L MTX Racing A) circuit school Most, produced 7 vehicles
- MTX 5-04 (Lada VFTS MTX Racing B) circuits and hills B racing, 1984
- MTX 5-05 (Lada Samara MTX Racing A) circuits and hills A racing, 1989
- MTX 5-06 (Škoda Favorit MTX Racing A/H) circuits and hills A racing, 1989

== Competition racing cars ==
- VAZ 2101 MTX Rallye A2 racing, 1974–1975, produced 10 vehicles
- VAZ 2103 MTX Rallye A2 racing, 1975–1977, produced 18 vehicles
- Lada 1600 MTX Rallye A2 racing, 1977–1982, produced 80 vehicles
- Lada MTX Rallye A5 A5 racing, 1976, produced 3 vehicles
- MTX 6-01 (Škoda 120 LS MTX Rallye) Škoda 120 racing, 1982–1985, produced 110 vehicles
- MTX 6-02 (Lada VFTS MTX Rallye) B racing, 1983, produced 24 vehicles
- MTX 6-03 (Škoda MTX 160 RS) B racing, in 1984 produced 3 vehicles, based on Škoda Garde with Lada 1600 engine
- MTX 6-04 (Lada 2105 MTX Rallye) A racing, 1984, produced 30 vehicles
- MTX 6-05 (Škoda 130 L MTX Rallye) A racing, 1985, produced 130 vehicles
- MTX 6-06 (Škoda 130 LR MTX Rallye) B racing, 1985, produced 20 vehicles
- MTX 6-07 (Škoda 130 L MTX Rallye) A racing "kit"
- MTX 6-09 (Škoda Favorit MTX Rallye) A racing
- MTX 6-10 (Moskvich Aleko 2141 MTX Rallye) A racing

== Special cars ==
- MTX 160 RZP-T two modified VAZ-2101 for fast assistance, 1977-1978
- UAZ 469 MTX modified UAZ-469 designed for shows, 1980
- Volha M 24/02 crash-testing car
- Škoda 130 MTX-JP modified car for the "Peace and friendship festival", 1985
- MTX 7-01 (Avia A20F) car for noise measurement
- MTX 7-02 (Avia A30) cable car
- MTX 7-03 (Škoda 1203 MV) accident car
- MTX 7-04 (Škoda 130 SP-MTX) road technical assistance, modified was 20 cars
- MTX 7-05 (Škoda Rapid MTX Cabrio) travel convertible
- MTX 7-06 (MTX Roadster) travel roadster, 1991-1996 based on Favorit 136, produced about 200 cars
- MTX 7-07 (Buggy Racer) buggy
- MTX 7-08 (ALFA) electric car
- MTX 7-09 (Verold Baghira) off-road roadster
- MTX 7-10 (Desta MTX) utility vehicle
- MTX 7-11 (Peugeot MTX Ambulance) ambulance car
- MTX 7-12 (VW MTX Ambulance 2,4D) ambulance car
- MTX 7-16 (Škoda Felicia MTX Cabrio) travel convertible, 1997-2000

== See also ==
- Tatra (company)
