= Vladimír Hubáček =

Czech rally driver (1932–2021)

- Born: 28 August 1932; Nechanice, Czechoslovakia
- Died: 2 September 2021 (aged 89)
- Occupation: Rally driver

Vladimír Hubáček (28 August 1932 – 2 September 2021) was a Czech rally driver.

== Biography ==
From the 1950s to the 1970s, Hubáček competed in rally cars such as the Škoda Octavia, the Renault 8 Gordini, and the Alpine A110. He won a total of 25 races, including the Barum Czech Rally Zlín three times. He was six-time champion of the Czechoslovak Formula Three Championship, five of which came in the Lotus 41. In 1969, he won the Cup of Peace and Friendship. He also raced in the Soviet Formula Three Championship and the East German Formula Three Championship.

Vladimír Hubáček died on 2 September 2021 at the age of 89.
