= Estonia Race Cars =

Racing car manufactured in Estonia

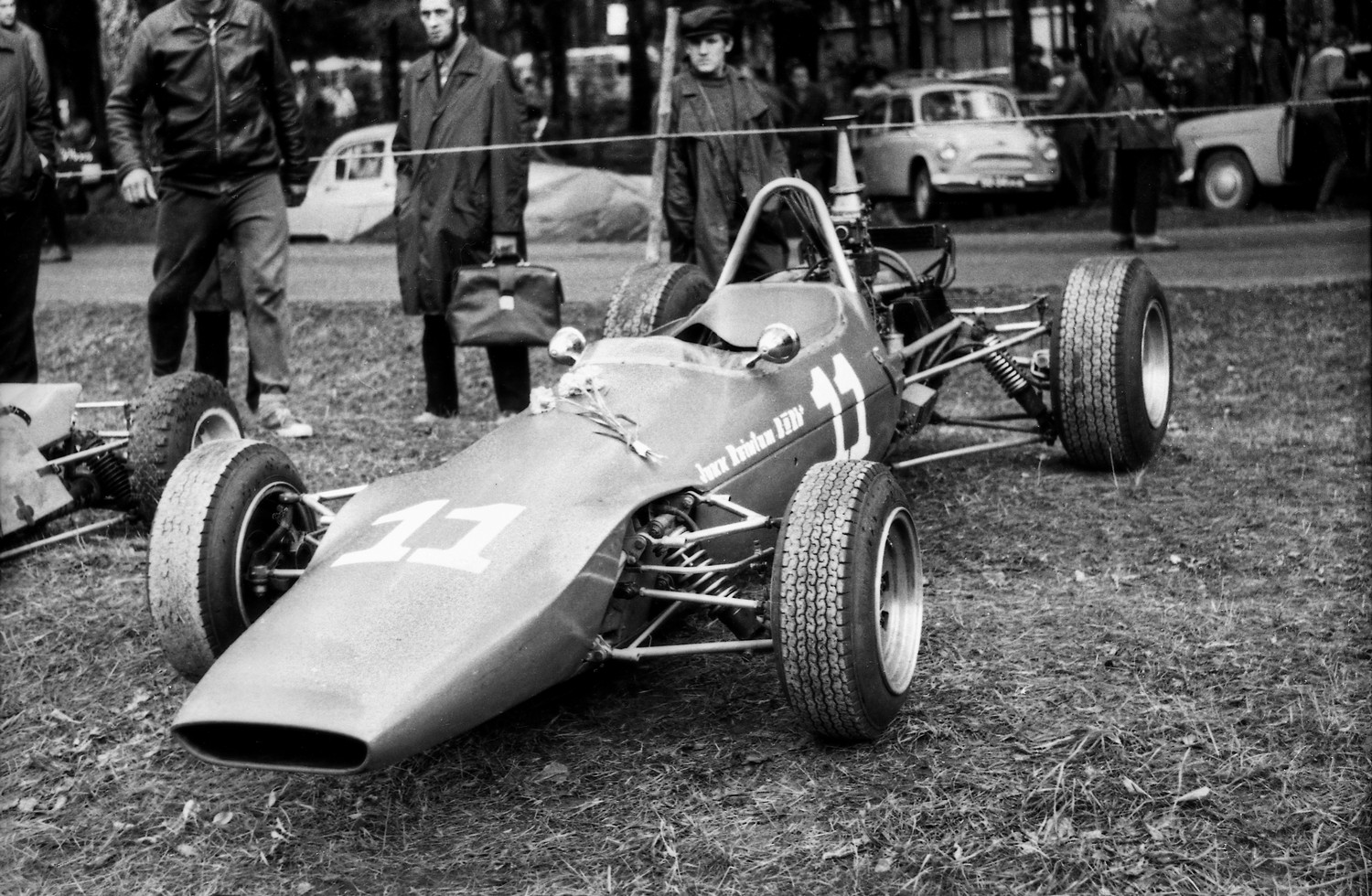
Estonia 16M

The Estonia Race Cars was a manufacturer of open wheel racing cars from the Estonian SSR. Their first model, the Estonia 1, was built in 1958 during the Soviet occupation of Estonia. Altogether about 1,300 cars were constructed. They were branded in Western Europe as TARK, Tallinna Autode Remondi Katsetehas. Later, the factory was privatized and renamed "Kavor Motorsport".

== Cars ==
- Estonia-1 (1958) Built by Ants Seiler, it used a Serpukhov 500 boxer engine with VW gearbox. At its first race, the car immediately broke a new track record. 1 made.
- Estonia-2 (1959) Similar to Estonia 3 (both cars were released simultaneously), but with different suspension. 1 made.
- Estonia-3 (1959) Used an Irbit 500 engine with self-engineered gearbox. 36 series cars made by 1961
- Estonia-4 (1960) Built by Jaan Küünemäe, an ESO 500 speedway engine was used. 1 made.
- Estonia-5 (1961) Used a Wartburg 980cc 2-stroke engine. F-junior car. 2 made.
- Estonia-9 (1966) Used a Wartburg 980cc engine, 39 made
- Estonia-10 (1964) A Soviet F1 car. Used a 2500cc engine. 1 made.

Estonia 10
- Category: Formula 1
- Production: 1

Technical specifications
- Engine: 2,500 cubic centimetres (150 cu in; 2.5 L) V6 Longitudinally Mounted
- Transmission: 5-speed Manual
- Power: 166 brake horsepower (168 PS; 124 kW); 175 newton-metres (129 lbf⋅ft)
- Weight: 548 kilograms (1,208 lb)

Competition history
Entries	Races	Wins	Podiums
3	1	0	0
Poles	F/Laps	Titles	
0	0	0	

- Estonia-11 (1964) Also a Soviet F1 car. 1 made.

Estonia 11
- Category: Formula 1
- Production: 1

Technical specifications
- Engine: 2,500 cubic centimetres (150 cu in; 2.5 L) V6 Longitudinally Mounted
- Transmission: 5-speed Manual
- Power: 177 brake horsepower (179 PS; 132 kW); 180 newton-metres (130 lbf⋅ft)
- Weight: 545 kilograms (1,202 lb)

Competition history
Entries	Races	Wins	Podiums
2	1	0	0
Poles	F/Laps	Titles	
0	0	0	

- Estonia-12 (1964) Used a Moskvich 408 engine. 1 made.
- Estonia-13 (1964) Used a Moskvich 408 engine. 1 made.
- Estonia-14 (1966) Soviet F1 car. 1 made.
- Estonia-15 (1967/70) Used IZh Jupiter 350 tuned engines. This car was positioned between kart and formula racing, allowing young drivers to step into a bigger class. Top speed of 160 km/h. 83 made.
- Estonia-15M (1970/74) An evolution of the Estonia 15, featuring improved aerodynamics and better cooling for the engine. 136 made.
- Estonia-16 (1968) A Moskvich 412 1500 SOCH engine, magnesium wheels, and disc brakes on all wheels were used. Integrated CO_{2} fire extinguisher system. 6 made.
- Estonia 16M (1970/75) Evolution of the Estonia 16. 100 made.
- Estonia-17 (1974) Soviet F1 car. 1 made.

Estonia 17
- Category: Formula 1
- Production: 1

Technical specifications
- Engine: 2,500 cubic centimetres (150 cu in; 2.5 L) V6 Longitudinally Mounted
- Transmission: 5-speed Manual
- Power: 185 brake horsepower (188 PS; 138 kW); 190 newton-metres (140 lbf⋅ft)
- Weight: 540 kilograms (1,190 lb)

Competition history
Entries	Races	Wins	Podiums
1	1	0	0
Poles	F/Laps	Titles	
0	0	0	

- Estonia-18 (1972/76) Quite similar to the Estonia 16, but with Lada 1300cc engine. 76 made.
- Estonia-18M (1976/77) Evolution of the Estonia 18. 37 made.
- Estonia-19 (1977/79) Radiators on the sides, wings at front and rear. Lada engine. 165 made.
- Estonia-20 (1980/82) New improved aerodynamics. Designed by Mart Kongo, a racing driver and engineer, and Jüri Iva. 154 made.
- Estonia-21 (1981) Designed by racing engineer and driver Raul Sarap, this car was a big breakthrough. It was the first time Estonia used ground effect to help their aerodynamics. A total of 295 cars were built. The Lada 1300/1600cc engine with a TARK 5-speed gearbox was used. Rocker arm suspension was used. Practically every component was built or modified at the TARK factory.

Estonia 21
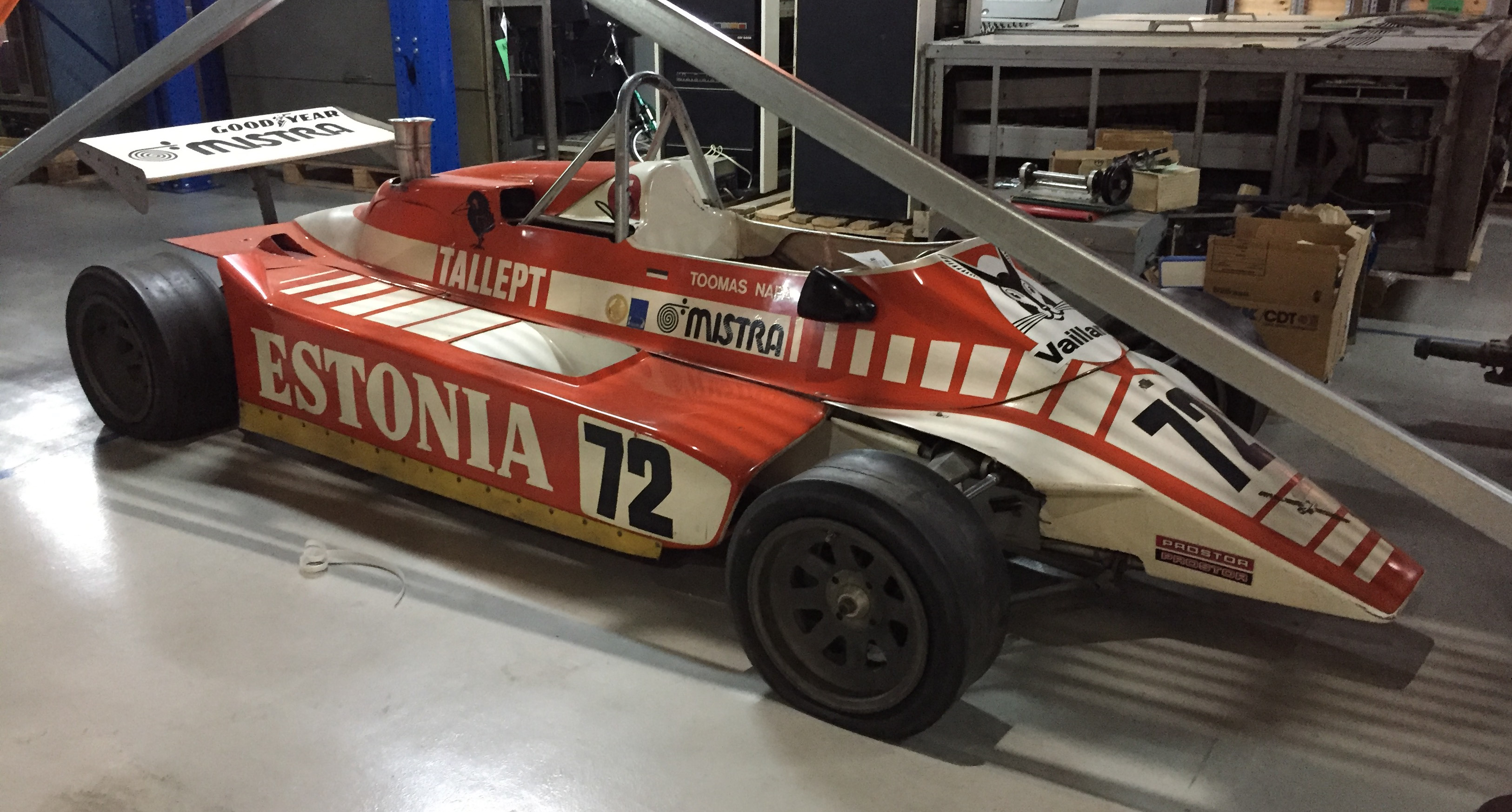
- Estonia 21
- Category: Formula Easter
- Constructor: Tallinna Autode Remondi Katsetehas
- Designer: Raul Sarap
- Predecessor: Estonia-20
- Successor: Estonia-22

Technical specifications
- Chassis: Tube frame
- Wheelbase: 2,400 mm (94 in)
- Engine: AvtoVAZ 1,294 cc (79.0 cu in) Straight-four engine
- Transmission: TARK 5-speed + 1 reverse
- Power: 85 hp (63 kW) @ 7,000 rpm 81 pound-feet (110 N⋅m) @ 3,400 rpm
- Weight: 435 kg (959 lb) including driver
- Fuel: Petrol

Competition history
Wins	Podiums	Poles	Titles
3	8	1	1

- Estonia-22 (1981) Built by Jüri Iva. The engine was from an IZh Jupiter 350 and the frame came from the Estonia 15. 1 made.
- Estonia 23 (1984) Ground effect test car, pull-rod suspensions.
- Estonia-24 (1985) Raul Sarap's next creation after the Estonia 21. An aluminum monocoque chassis was used and a Lada 1600 engine with fuel injection and electronic ignition was used. 4 made.
- Estonia-25 (1989) Designed by Aleksander Sadovsky and Jaanus Heinsar. It was their first production car with an aluminum monocoque. Monocoques (or "bathtubs") were built in a Russian military helicopter factory, and weighed just 39 kg. The car had push-rod suspension. Most cars were sold to Poland and East Germany. Aerodynamic solutions were tested at a Russian aircraft wind tunnel. Engines were 1600cc Lada engines and 1600–1800cc VW Golf GTI units for Scandinavian F4. Some cars were equipped with western racing components. 67 made.
- Estonia 26 (1994) Improved aerodynamics, VW Golf GTI engine. 6 made.
- Estonia 26-9 (2000) The last Estonia car. Improved aerodynamics, Hewland gearbox, AP brakes, dry sump VW engine, improved weight distribution, improved suspension. 1 made.

There was a plan to design and build an Estonia 27 car, but it was never implemented. However, factory CEO Juhan Sein mentored the Tallinn Formula Student team for their first cars, and so heritage and knowledge were passed on to the students. The TTTK/TTÜ F-Student team has been a success, being a top 10 contender early on.

- TARK Aleko JK173 (1989) This car was not produced by TARK at all. TARK facilities were planned to be used for production. The whole project was a scam and ended up as fiasco.

== Technical ==
All of the Estonia race cars were produced under difficult situations. The Soviet planned economy made acquiring engines and other components nearly impossible. Everything had to be "wizarded out" by personal connections in the automotive industry. That being said, the Republic of Estonia was considered more open than the rest of the USSR, so it was more possible to have some information about western racing technology. For example, it was possible to smuggle in racing magazines from Finland. Also, Finnish television broadcasts could be received in northern Estonia, so TARK engineers watched F1 championships. Because of this, modern F1 solutions made their way into Tallinn.

Early Estonia cars used motorcycle engines or Wartburg 2-stroke motors. Riders (or mechanics) usually prepared the engines themselves. Later, mostly Lada 1300 or 1600 engines were used. 1300cc engines were used in "Formula Vostok" and class rules were quite strict, allowing only the stock camshaft. Later, the 1600cc class was more free, and engine power grew accordingly - up to 165 hp or even more.

From the Estonia 16 onwards, TARK built their own gearboxes. They took the ZAZ-968 gearbox casing, turned it 180° over, and used their in-house developed gear system. All the gears were quickly interchangeable for different ratios.

All major components such as the steering rack, brakes, shock absorbers, ignition systems etc. were built at the TARK factory. They also made their own magnesium wheels.

Professional drivers such as Toomas Napa or Toivo Asmer had special cars from factory, featuring wider wheels and lighter titanium and magnesium parts.
