= Formula Easter =

Motorsport in the Soviet Union

Formula Easter (or Forma Easter) was a single-seater, open wheel, open cockpit circuit car racing series that ran from 1972 to 1988, specifically created for drivers from the communist bloc. Cars driven were created solely from parts manufactured by the COMECON industry or created from scratch as a citizens' initiative by Eastern Bloc residents. Nominally, the series belonged to FIA Formula Category 9 and Technical Group 8, although the FIA only acknowledged, and did not officially sanction, its existence.

== Technical specifics ==
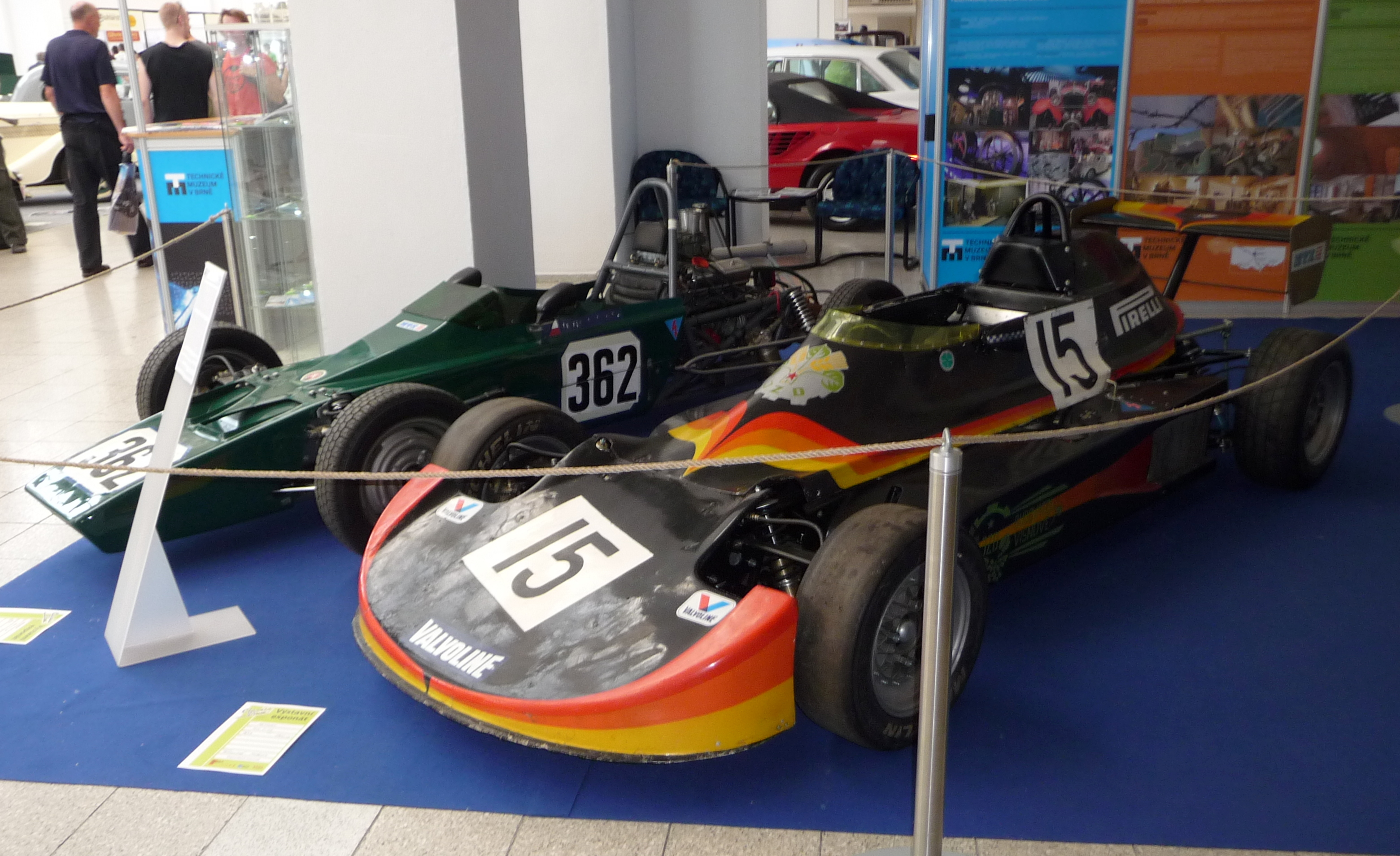
Formula MTX 1-02 and MTX 1-03

Engine displacement was restricted to 1300 cubic centimeters, which led to widespread adoption of the Lada (Zhiguli) 21011 engine block. These Soviet made inline-4 powerplants produced 70-75 hp off the assembly line, and could be tuned up to 90-110 hp with moderate effort.

The Formula Easter rulebook banned any modification of carburetors, pistons or the camshaft. Better financed and well-connected teams were able to source these parts from Lada cars specifically made for export markets outside the Eastern Bloc, as those batches exhibited better workmanship and more potential for tuning. Some teams opted for engines from the Dacia 1300, Polski Fiat 125p, Skoda 105 or Wartburg 353 cars, for national representation, but these were less popular in the series.

Lada-sourced engines were sometimes connected to Soviet-made, cast magnesium Zaporozhets ZAZ-968 car gearbox housings via custom-made, load-bearing interconnectors - which setup, made it easier to access and swap out the ratio gears in the pit stop. This helped to alleviate the limits imposed by 4-speed push-wheel or stick shift transmissions.

Suspension was usually adapted from the East German Barkas minivans and teams filled the strut legs with in-house mixed oils to enhance their performance. Half-axles often came from the Soviet-made UAZ all-terrain capable jeeps and minivans. Deceleration was provided by aftermarket-drilled Soviet Lada brake discs, paired with East German, four-piston Wartburg calipers. The steering assembly was often adopted from East German Trabant mini-compact cars, but required extensive modification to fit the available space.

== Supporting industry and economic background ==
Many teams decided to assemble their cars in their own garage or shed. The entire process sometimes took as long as 4 years, when including the welding of a space frame tubular chassis and the ply-laying of fiberglass or synthetic resin bodywork, with the aerodynamics usually augmented by adding simple front and rear downforce wings.

Better financed teams could buy a ready-to-run Formula Easter racecar or bodied chassis from Estonia in the Baltic SSRs or the Metalex garage in Czechoslovakia, but the controlling authority (technical committees) had a measure of success in enforcing the race series' declared and preferred a low entry and low running cost nature.

Tires also had to be of socialist origin to be race legal, but minor teams had difficulty sourcing enough new racing tires (Czech-made Barum or Soviet Prostor wheel sets) thereby leading to a second-hand market of used, sometimes dangerously worn, slicks. These were used during tests, so as not to degrade the precious few new racing tires before the race.

== At the races ==
International Formula Easter events were often held at Schleiz (GDR), Autodrom Most (CZ), Minsk (Byelorussian SSR) and Kyiv (Ukrainian SSR), as part of the Cup of Peace and Friendship series. Some countries also held national Formula Easter races, with up to a dozen participating cars.

The international series were mainly dominated by Estonia Formula cars, which were the most successful and won many titles, because Estonia was more open than the rest of the USSR, so it was easier to access information about western racing technology. Soviet, East German and Czech-Slovakian teams were also competitive because they could rely on a degree of support from their domestic car industries. Lesser teams, like the Hungarians (who had no domestic automobile manufacturing), had to resort to home-garage-built racers, equipped with stock non-export Lada engines or rely on friendly donations of disused Formula Junior and Formula Vee cars from East Germany, which had to be extensively reworked to qualify for Formula Easter.

After the fall of communism, many Formula Easter teams and drivers converted to the Formula Ford series.

== See also ==
- Keleti torpedok - Torpedoes of the East
- Autoversenyzok (Race car drivers), a Hungarian docu-movie, 94 minutes, year 1979, scripted by Attila Foldi, directed by Peter Rona, photography by Sandor Dobai
- Stiller, an amateur's struggle to race on the new Hungaroring (docu-drama aired by WDF, Westdeutscher Rundfunk Cologne television, 1986)
