= Biķernieki Complex Sports Base =

Sport venue in Riga, Latvia

- Logo of the Biķernieki Trase Circuit

- High Speed Ring - Ātruma Aplis (1968–present)
- Location: Riga, Latvia
- Coordinates: 56°57′59.04″N 24°13′17.4″E
- Broke ground: January 1966; 60 years ago
- Opened: July 1966; 59 years ago
- Major events: Current: FIA European Rallycross; Euro RX of Latvia (2016–2022, 2026); BaTCC (2000–present); Drift Masters (2016–present); Former: FIA World RX; World RX of Latvia (2016–2022); Cup of Peace and Friendship (1968, 1984–1986, 1988–1990)
- Website: http://www.bksb.lv

Large Combined Ring - Lielais Apvienotais Aplis (1968–present)
- Length: 5.949 km (3.697 mi)
- Turns: 28

High Speed Ring - Ātruma Aplis (1968–present)
- Length: 3.662 km (2.275 mi)
- Turns: 14

Ring of Skill - Meistarības Aplis (1966–present)
- Length: 3.580 km (2.225 mi)
- Turns: 21

Short Oval Circuit (1966–present)
- Length: 1.700 km (1.056 mi)
- Turns: 7

Biķernieki Complex Sports Base (Latvian: Biķernieku kompleksā sporta bāze), commonly known as Biķernieku trase, is a racing circuit and cross-country skiing course in the Biķernieki Forest in Riga, Latvia. It is adjacent to the racing circuit is the Riga Speedway Stadium.

== History ==
In 1962, the design of the track was started. Eduards Kiope was appointed director of the sports complex, and the project manager was Gunars Binde. A group of specialists were also invited: Pēteris Dzenis, Jānis Roops, Kārlis Rība and Vilnis Vasulis. During the first phase of the project, it was planned to create two circles which initially were to be used for motorcycle racing and kart racing.

In January 1966 the construction of the circuit began. The first difficulties appeared as there were swamps and underground springs at the start line for the karts, so in places, constructors had to dig up to seven metres deep and fill it with several tens of thousands of cubic metres of sand. Because of the difficulty of building the track, many local volunteers were involved in the project. In July of the same year, the first races were held there, with motorcycle races in six different classes taking place.

Fifty years later, a rallycross circuit was created after Latvia won a contract to host a round of the FIA World Rallycross Championship. This circuit also hosts rounds of the FIA European Rallycross Championship and the FIA NEZ Rallycross Championship. The rallycross rounds were held until 2022, the circuit was dropped from the 2023 season.

World RX layout of Biķernieku Kompleksā Sporta Bāze

In the 3.580 km (2.225 mi) Ring of Skill layout, Andrejs Grīnbergs broke the lap record with a time of 1:38.480 in superbike.

The track record is 1:12.725, set on 17 June 2024 by Tõnis Vanaselja with Estonian supercar Oldbac Kalana.

== Layouts ==
Track	Length	Maximum width	Minimum width	Surface	Maximum cars on track
Main	3.662 km (2.275 mi)	16 m (52 ft)	10 m (33 ft)	asphalt	38
Rallycross	1.295 km (0.805 mi)			asphalt (60%), dirt (40%)	
Karting	1.227 km (0.762 mi)	10 m (33 ft)	8 m (26 ft)	asphalt	17 (25 karts)
Small (ovāls)	1.700 km (1.056 mi)	16 m (52 ft)	10 m (33 ft)	asphalt	17
Big Circle	5.949 km (3.697 mi)	16 m (52 ft)	10 m (33 ft)	asphalt	49
Forest Circuit	2.375 km (1.476 mi)	10 m (33 ft)	8 m (26 ft)	asphalt	23

== See also ==
- Rallycross
- FIA World Rallycross Championship
- FIA European Rallycross Championship
