= 1984 Polish Car Racing Championships =

28th season of the Polish Car Racing Championships

1984 Polish Car Racing Championships refers to the 28th season of the Polish Car Racing Championships.

The season was contested in seven classes, though the planned introduction of Class 8, a class for production-model Polish Fiat 125p and Polonez, did not happen.

The 1984 Polish Car Racing Championships season consisted of five qualifying rounds, two of which were held at the tracks in Poznań (1 May, 7 October) and Kielce (27 May, 9 September), and one in Toruń (2 September). The race in Kielce on 27 May also served as a qualifying round for the Cup of Peace and Friendship. In addition, a competition not counting toward WSMP points was organized in Piotrków Trybunalski on 22 July, and on the occasion of three qualifying rounds, unofficial Grand Prix events were also held: the Grand Prix of Toruń (2 September), the Grand Prix of the Świętokrzyskie Mountains (9 September), and the Grand Prix of Poznań (7 October).

Based on the results, seven Polish champions for the 1984 season were chosen: Jacek Chojnacki, Dariusz Kinderman, Wojciech Cołoszyński, Wacław Janowski, Edward Kinderman, Jerzy Mazur, and Jerzy Krotoski. Janowski was the only driver to defend the title he had won the previous year.

== Background ==
In 1953, on the initiative of the Polish Automobile and Motorcycle Federation, which had been established three years earlier, the first season of the Polish Car Racing Championships was organized. In the early seasons, drivers mostly used their own designs, collectively known as SAM. However, in 1957, driver and designer Jerzy Jankowski built the Rak 650 – a modern race car powered by a Triumph engine. In 1958, the vehicle won the Polish Championships, and a year later, the runner-up title. The car was subsequently replaced by the Rak 1300.

During this period in Italy, due to the lack of competitiveness of the local Formula 3, a new racing series called Formula Junior was established. In 1959, the International Automobile Federation approved Formula Junior as an international formula category. In 1961, the first season of the Polish Championships was held under Formula Junior regulations. In the 1964 season, Formula Junior was replaced in Poland by Formula 3. However, due to the dwindling number of competitors in the championships and difficulties in finding suitable tracks, the Polish Car Racing Championships were suspended after 1967.

In the early 1970s, a drivers' strike took place, after which Longin Bielak undertook the reform of Polish racing. The reorganized championships were revived in 1972, introducing passenger car classes (including the Polish Fiat 125p and Fiat 126 classes). Single-seater races were held as part of Formula Easter, and from 1974 onward, also Formula Polonia. During this period, tracks were also built in Poznań and Kielce.

=== 1983 season ===
In the 1983 season, a production-car class for Fiat 126 (Class 1) was held for the first time. The class for Fiat 126p cars with engines up to 652 cm^{3} (with possible modifications), which had been held the previous year as Class 1, became Class 2 in 1983. The same applied to Class 3 (cars with engines up to 700 cm^{3} – Fiat 126p, Trabant) and Class 4 (a brand-specific class with engines up to 1,500 cm^{3} – Polish Fiat 125p and FSO Polonez, as well as cars manufactured in Eastern Bloc countries with engines up to 1,300 cm^{3}). In place of the abolished classes 5 (touring and GT cars with engines of 1,300–1,600 cm^{3}) and 6 (touring and GT cars with engines of 1,600–2,000 cm^{3}), Class 5 was introduced – passenger cars with engines up to 2,500 cm^{3} and Polish prototypes with engines up to 2,000 cm^{3}. Classes 6 and 7 were Formula Easter and Formula Polonia, respectively. The races took place at the Poznań (twice), Kielce (twice), and Toruń (once) circuits. The distance of each race was approximately 40 km.

In Class 1, the Polish champion was Krzysztof Caputa of the FSM factory team, who won three races. The Class 2 championship was won by Włodzimierz Krukowski, who triumphed in four races. In Class 3, Krukowski and Tomasz Barański each won two races, but Barański was crowned champion. Class 4 was won by Wacław Janowski (Zastava 1300), who finished first in four rounds. In Class 5 (from which Marian Bublewicz, driving a Stratopolonez, was excluded), Andrzej Koper triumphed three times and won the championships in a Renault 5 Alpine. The Class 6 champion was Andrzej Hołowiej, who won four rounds in an MTX 1-03. In Class 7, the title was won by Piotr Zaleski (Promot II), who finished one point ahead of Witold Nalewaj in the standings.

On 5 June 1983, during the Cup of Peace and Friendship qualifiers at Autodrom Chayka near Kyiv, an accident occurred in which Polish rider Christian Grochowski died. On the 13th lap of the race, Grochowski collided with Toomas Napa, who was lapping him. As a result of the accident, Grochowski lost consciousness, and his vehicle caught fire. Due to the inaction of emergency services, the rescue operation began late, and Grochowski died in the hospital from burns two days after the incident. He was the only Polish race car driver to die in a track accident during the Polish People's Republic era.

== Regulations ==
In 1984, as in previous years, the basis for establishing the classes was the classification of cars into groups according to the International Automobile Federation regulations, which were as follows:

- Group N – standard touring cars, manufactured in quantities of at least 5,000 units per year;
- Group A – touring cars with extensive modification potential, manufactured in quantities of at least 5,000 units per year;
- Group B – GT cars with extensive modification potential, produced in quantities of at least 200 units per year;
- Group C – closed-body sports cars with engines derived from Group A or B cars;
- Group E – racing cars of free formula and national formula.

On this basis, the Polish Automobile and Motorcycle Federation established eight classes in which the 1984 Polish Car Racing Championships were contested:

- Class 1 – production class – Fiat 126p with an engine up to 652 cm^{3} (Group N);
- Class 2 – production class – Fiat 126p with engine up to 652 cm^{3} (Group A);
- Class 3 – cars with engine up to 700 cm^{3} (Group A);
- Class 4 – production class – Polski Fiat 125p and FSO Polonez with engine up to 1,500 cm^{3}, and cars manufactured in Eastern Bloc countries with engine up to 1,300 cm^{3} (Group A);
- Class 5 – passenger cars with engine up to 2,500 cm^{3} (Group A, B, or C) and domestic prototypes with engine up to 2,000 cm^{3};
- Class 6 – Formula Easter – single-seater racing cars with an engine from a Group N or A car manufactured in Eastern Bloc countries, up to 1,300 cm^{3};
- Class 7 – Formula Polonia – single-seater racing cars with a Polish Fiat 125p engine of 1,300 cm^{3} and a Dacia or Zaporozhets gearbox;
- Class 8 – production class – Polish Fiat 125p, FSO 125p, and FSO Polonez with engine up to 1,500 cm^{3} (Group N).

Due to low interest in Class 8, no championship was ultimately held in that class, and drivers competing in such vehicles raced alongside Class 4.

50 points were awarded for a victory. The second-place driver received 46 points, and the third-place driver received 43 points. Subsequent positions were scored on a scale of 41-39-38-37-36, and so on. The final standings were determined by the four best results.

== Calendar ==
Two rounds of the 1984 Polish Car Racing Championships were held at the Poznań Circuit

As in the previous year, the 1984 Polish Car Racing Championships season consisted of five qualifying rounds. It began with a qualifying round in Poznań on 1 May (practice sessions were held the day before). The second race took place on 27 May in Kielce and also served as a qualifying round for the Cup of Peace and Friendship. The race was held at the Toruń airport circuit on 2 September, and a week later, again in Kielce. The season ended on 7 October with the second race in Poznań.

In addition to these events, three other races were scheduled for classes Classes 1–5, which did not count toward the championships standings. The first of these took place on 22 July in Piotrków Trybunalski. The second was held during the second round in Kielce on 9 September and was run as the Świętokrzyskie Mountains Grand Prix, while the third – the Grand Prix of Poznań – took place on 7 October in Poznań. On the occasion of the qualifying round in Toruń on 2 September, a handicap race, the Toruń Grand Prix, was held for Formula Polonia and Formula Easter cars, in which the Formula Polonia vehicles started 45 seconds ahead of the Formula Easter ones.

The distance of each race was approximately 40 kilometers.

Round	Date	Circuit	Laps	Distance (km)	Classes	Support events
1	1 May	(Poland) Poznań	10	40.850	all	
2	27 May	(Poland) Kielce	10	41.600	all	Cup of Peace and Friendship
3	2 September	(Poland) Toruń	14	42.000	all	Grand Prix of Toruń
4	9 September	(Poland) Kielce	10	41.600	all	Grand Prix of the Świętokrzyskie Mountains
5	7 October	(Poland) Poznań	10	40.850	all	Grand Prix of Poznań

== Season ==
=== Round 1: Poznań ===
The first round of the 1984 Polish Car Racing Championships season took place on 30 April (practice/qualifying) and 1 May (race). The race in each class consisted of 10 laps, bringing the total race distance to 40.850 km.

Defending champions, Andrzej Koper and Andrzej Hołowiej, did not compete in Poznań, and three drivers were not defending their titles due to moving to other classes. The event took place in rainy conditions, with relatively low spectator turnout.

In Class 1, Zbyszko Gaik secured pole position. Starting third, Zdzisław Brymora overtook second-place Robert Herba and rode right behind Gaik for the rest of the race, briefly taking the lead on the 5th lap. Ultimately, Gaik won the race with a 0.2-second lead over Brymora. Jacek Chojnacki finished third, 15.5 seconds behind.

Bogdan Pawlak started from pole position in Class 2. Jerzy Wierzbołowski, starting from third place, took the lead at the start, but Krzysztof Caputa overtook him on the third lap. A lap later, Wierzbołowski regained the lead. On the sixth lap, Dariusz Kinderman became the new leader. During the ninth lap, Wierzbołowski moved up from third to first place and won the race. Kinderman finished second, and Zbigniew Kordek third.

Włodzimierz Krukowski, starting from pole position in Class 3, led the entire race, winning it with a lead of nearly 50 seconds over Tomasz Barański. The podium, which was entirely made up of drivers in Fiat 126p cars, was completed by Wojciech Cołoszyński.

Wacław Janowski (Zastava 1300), who started from pole position in Class 4, was unable to maintain the lead after the start, as he was overtaken by Andrzej Mielcarek (Zastava 1300), Henryk Mandera (Lada 1300), and Adam Polak (Polish Fiat 125p). Janowski dropped out on the sixth lap. Mielcarek, who led throughout the race, lost his advantage a few kilometers before the finish line while lapping four competitors, but ultimately won the race. Mandera finished second, 0.4 seconds behind the winner, and Polak finished third, 0.8 seconds behind.

The MB-03 made its debut in Class 5; its designer and driver was Maciej Bogusławski. He started from third position, while pole position was secured by Edward Kinderman (Polonez Prototype 1800 with a Fiat 132 engine). Bogusławski took the lead on the first lap, but lost it to Andrzej Kleina (Opel Kadett) on the next lap. Bogusławski regained the lead on the sixth lap. Two laps later, Kleina was back in the lead, but on the ninth lap he was overtaken by Bogusławski, who ultimately won the race with a 2.4-second lead over Kleina. Third place went to Piotr Nowicki (Polish Fiat 125p).

Czechoslovak-made MTX 1-06 cars made their debut in Class 6, driven by Jacek Szmidt, Józef Kiełbania, and Jerzy Mazur. This race was the only one in Poznań to take place in dry conditions. Szmidt, who had secured pole position, dropped to fourth place at the start, with Kiełbania taking the lead. On the third lap, Szmidt overtook Kiełbania and won the race. Three kilometers before the finish line, Mazur spun out, allowing Stefan Banaszak (Promot 83) to finish second behind Kiełbania.

Andrzej Wojciechowski (Promot 76), who started first in Class 7, held the lead until the second lap, when he was overtaken by Jerzy Krotoski (Promot 82). Mariusz Podkalicki (Promot 76) finished behind Krotoski and Wojciechowski.

The Class 8 race, for which two drivers had registered, was canceled.

In the team standings, the round in Poznań was won by Greater Poland Automobilklub, which scored 150 points.

Class	1st place	2nd place	3rd place
1	Zbyszko Gaik (Fiat 126p)	Zdzisław Brymora (Fiat 126p)	Jacek Chojnacki (Fiat 126p)
2	Jerzy Wierzbołowski (Fiat 126p)	Dariusz Kinderman (Fiat 126p)	Zbigniew Kordek (Fiat 126p)
3	Włodzimierz Krukowski (Fiat 126p)	Tomasz Barański (Fiat 126p)	Wojciech Cołoszyński (Fiat 126p)
4	Andrzej Mielcarek (Zastava 1300)	Henryk Mandera (Lada 1300)	Adam Polak (Polish Fiat 125p 1500)
5	Maciej Bogusławski (MB-03)	Andrzej Kleina (Opel Kadett)	Piotr Nowicki (Polish Fiat 125p 1500)
6	Jacek Szmidt (MTX 1-06)	Józef Kiełbania (MTX 1-06)	Stefan Banaszak (Promot 83)
7	Jerzy Krotoski (Promot 82)	Andrzej Wojciechowski (Promot 76)	Mariusz Podkalicki (Promot 76)

=== Round 2: Kielce ===
The second qualifying round was held in Kielce on 26–27 May. Each class competed in a race over 10 laps (41.600 km). A race as part of the Cup of Peace and Friendship was also held at the Kielce circuit at that time.

In Class 1, Ireneusz Trzeszczkowski secured pole position. However, Jacek Chojnacki and Zdzisław Brymora battled for the lead throughout the race. Ultimately, Brymora was overtaken by Zbyszko Gaik, and Chojnacki, Gaik, and Brymora stood on the podium. After the race, three drivers were disqualified.

Dariusz Kinderman started the Class 2 race from pole position. He led the entire race except for the sixth lap, when Paweł Puchalski briefly took the lead. Kinderman won, Piotr Kolasiński finished second, and Andrzej Pięta came in third. After the race, 12 drivers, including Pięta, were disqualified for non-regulation flywheel weight or throttle bore diameter. As a result, Krzysztof Caputa took the podium.

Włodzimierz Krukowski won the Class 3 practice session. He led until the fifth lap, when Tomasz Barański overtook him. Barański dropped out of the race due to a mechanical failure, and Andrzej Godula (Trabant) took the lead, going on to win the race. Krukowski, who was in second place, dropped to fourth on the final lap due to engine problems, behind Kazimierz Sołtowski (Trabant) and Zbigniew Szwagierczak (Fiat 126p).

In Class 4, Wacław Janowski secured pole position. He led the entire race, finishing ahead of Andrzej Mielcarek and Henryk Mandera.

In Class 5, Maciej Bogusławski once again secured pole position with his prototype and went on to lead the entire race. Wacław Janowski, who had initially been in second place, dropped out on the fourth lap. Edward Kinderman therefore took second place in the race, and Andrzej Kleina took third.

Jacek Szmidt secured pole position in Class 6. However, Jerzy Mazur took the lead at the start of the race and held it until the finish line, claiming his first victory in Formula Easter. Józef Kiełbania, who had initially been running in third place, suffered an engine failure on the second lap. Stefan Banaszak finished behind Mazur and Szmidt.

Jerzy Krotoski, who had secured pole position in Class 7, lost the lead to Mariusz Podkalicki three laps into the race but managed to regain it later. On the final lap, Grzegorz Kamiński (Promot 82) took the lead and went on to win. After the race, Kamiński was disqualified, leaving Krotoski, Podkalicki, and Eugeniusz Kulawik (Promot 76) to finish in the top three.

The Class 8 race, for which two drivers had entered, was canceled again. They competed alongside Class 4.

The team classification was won, for the second time in a row, by Greater Poland Automobilklub, with a one-point lead over Lower Silesian Automobilklub.

Two races were held in the Cup of Peace and Friendship: one for touring cars (engine displacement up to 1,300 cm^{3}) and one for race cars (Formula Easter). In the touring car class, the top two spots were taken by Soviet competitors: Aleksei Grigoryev (VAZ 21011) and Yuri Serov (VAZ 2105), with Czechoslovak Petr Samohýl (Škoda 120 LS) taking the podium. In the nations' classification for this class, the Soviet Union triumphed ahead of Czechoslovakia and Bulgaria. In the racing car class, the top two positions were taken by Czechoslovaks: Jan Veselý (RAF 80) and Jiří Červa (MTX 1-06), while third place went to an East German driver, Ulli Melkus (MT 77). Czechoslovakia won the nations' classification in this class, ahead of East Germany and the Soviet Union.

Class	1st place	2nd place	3rd place
1	Jacek Chojnacki (Fiat 126p)	Zbyszko Gaik (Fiat 126p)	Zdzisław Brymora (Fiat 126p)
2	Dariusz Kinderman (Fiat 126p)	Piotr Kolasiński (Fiat 126p)	Krzysztof Caputa (Fiat 126p)
3	Andrzej Godula (Trabant 600)	Kazimierz Sołtowski (Trabant 600)	Zbigniew Szwagierczak (Fiat 126p)
4	Wacław Janowski (Zastava 1300)	Andrzej Mielcarek (Zastava 1300)	Henryk Mandera (Lada 1300)
5	Maciej Bogusławski (MB-03)	Edward Kinderman (Polonez Prototype 1800)	Andrzej Kleina (Opel Kadett)
6	Jerzy Mazur (MTX 1-06)	Jacek Szmidt (MTX 1-06)	Stefan Banaszak (Promot 83)
7	Jerzy Krotoski (Promot 82)	Mariusz Podkalicki (Promot 76)	Eugeniusz Kulawik (Promot 76)

=== Piotrków Trybunalski ===
On 22 July, the anniversary of the proclamation of the Manifesto of the Polish Committee of National Liberation, an unofficial competition with four races was held in Piotrków Trybunalski: Class 1, a combined Class 2 and 3 race, a combined Class 4 and 5 race, and a handicap race. In Class 1, Jacek Chojnacki triumphed ahead of Leszek Wojdaliński and Tomasz Olejnik. The Class 2+3 race was won by Wojciech Cołoszyński, followed by Jacek Chojnacki and Marek Miziak. In the Class 4+5 race, Robert Moritz (Lada 1600) proved to be the fastest, ahead of Waldemar Lasota and Zbigniew Janiec (Polish Fiat 125p). Moritz won the handicap race ahead of Janiec and Cołoszyński.

=== Round 3: Toruń ===
The third round of the 1984 Polish Car Racing Championships season took place at the Toruń airport circuit on 1–2 September. The race was run over 14 laps (42 km).

Jacek Chojnacki secured pole position in Class 1 and, leading throughout the race, won the event. Zdzisław Brymora and Leszek Wojdaliński finished behind Chojnacki. Four drivers were disqualified after the race.

Dariusz Kinderman secured pole position and won the Class 2 race. Jerzy Wierzbołowski, who started from second place, dropped out on the seventh lap. Krzysztof Caputa took second place in the race, and Wojciech Smorawiński took third.

In Class 3, Andrzej Godula started from pole position. However, he finished the race in 16th place. Adam Sowa won ahead of Wojciech Cołoszyński and Zbigniew Zapędowski (all in Fiat 126p cars).

Adam Polak – who had secured pole position in Class 4 – dropped out of the race on the third lap. Wacław Janowski triumphed, with Andrzej Mielcarek finishing the race less than 50 seconds behind him. Third place went to Marek Kozłowski (Lada 1300).

The Prototype 1300 made its debut in Class 5, driven by Mieczysław Dymek. Dymek qualified in 11th place, while Maciej Bogusławski set the fastest time in qualifying. Bogusławski led the race until the third lap, when he dropped out due to a mechanical failure in his MB-03. Adam Polak then took the lead and went on to win the race. Edward Kinderman finished second, and Grzegorz Niśkiewicz (Opel Manta E) took third place.

The pole sitter in Class 6, Jacek Szmidt, committed a false start, for which he received a 30-second penalty. Ultimately, he finished the race in third place, behind Jerzy Mazur and Stefan Banaszak.

Jerzy Krotoski, starting from pole position in Class 7, led the entire race and won it with a lead of nearly 13 seconds over Tomasz Sikora (Promot 82) and over 14 seconds over Piotr Górecki (Promot 77).

The team classification was won by Warsaw Automobilklub.

The Toruń Grand Prix was also held in conjunction with the Toruń qualifying round. It was a combined Formula Polonia and Formula Easter race with a handicap race, meaning that the Formula Polonia drivers started 45 seconds ahead of the Formula Easter competitors. Mariusz Podkalicki won this race ahead of Jacek Szmidt and Jerzy Krotoski.

Class	1st place	2nd place	3rd place
1	Jacek Chojnacki (Fiat 126p)	Zdzisław Brymora (Fiat 126p)	Leszek Wojdaliński (Fiat 126p)
2	Dariusz Kinderman (Fiat 126p)	Krzysztof Caputa (Fiat 126p)	Wojciech Smorawiński (Fiat 126p)
3	Adam Sowa (Fiat 126p)	Wojciech Cołoszyński (Fiat 126p)	Zbigniew Zapędowski (Fiat 126p)
4	Wacław Janowski (Zastava 1300)	Andrzej Mielcarek (Zastava 1300)	Marek Kozłowski (Lada 1300)
5	Adam Polak (Polish Fiat 125p 1500)	Edward Kinderman (Polonez Prototype 1800)	Grzegorz Niśkiewicz (Opel Manta E)
6	Jerzy Mazur (MTX 1-06)	Stefan Banaszak (Promot 83)	Jacek Szmidt (MTX 1-06)
7	Jerzy Krotoski (Promot 82)	Tomasz Sikora (Promot 82)	Piotr Górecki (Promot 77)

=== Round 4: Kielce ===
The fourth race of the season, like the second, took place at the Kielce circuit over a distance of 10 laps (41.600 km). It was held on 8–9 September.

In Class 1, Jacek Chojnacki secured pole position and went on to lead the entire race. Behind Chojnacki, five drivers battled for second place. Ultimately, Zbyszko Gaik took second place, and Zdzisław Brymora finished third. After the race, three competitors were disqualified for unauthorized car modifications. Thanks to his victory, Chojnacki secured his first title in Class 1.

Wojciech Smorawiński secured the pole position in Class 2 and led at the start of the race. Starting from sixth position, Dariusz Kinderman took the lead on the fourth lap and won the race. Smorawiński and Krzysztof Caputa battled for second place. Caputa, trying to catch up to his rival, rolled his car but managed to finish the race. Third place, behind Kinderman and Smorawiński, went to Sławomir Kruk. Kinderman, like Chojnacki in Class 1, secured his first title in the class.

Wojciech Cołoszyński, who had secured pole position in Class 3, fell behind Tomasz Barański at the start. Barański led all the way to the finish line and won the race. In the early stages of the race, Włodzimierz Krukowski was running in second place, but on the fifth lap he dropped out due to an engine failure in his Fiat 126p. Cołoszyński therefore took second place, and Adam Sowa took third. Before the final round, five drivers remained in contention for the championships (Cołoszyński, Barański, Andrzej Godula, Zbigniew Zapędowski, and Witalis Misiewicz).

At the start of the Class 4 race, Henryk Mandera, starting from pole position, was overtaken by Wacław Janowski. Janowski led throughout the race, while Adam Polak and Mandera battled for second place. Mandera spun his car twice (on the third and final laps), finishing the race in sixth place. Janowski won with a 37.7-second lead over Polak. Andrzej Mielcarek finished third. Only Janowski and Mielcarek remained in contention for the title after the Kielce round.

In Class 5, Maciej Bogusławski started from pole position. On the third lap, he lost the lead due to engine trouble, and Bogdan Wozowicz (Ford Escort 2000) took over as the new leader. Edward Kinderman, the leader in the Polish championship standings, dropped out on the fourth lap due to an engine failure. Wozowicz won the race ahead of Adam Polak and Piotr Nowicki. After the fourth round, Bogusławski led the standings with a nine-point advantage over Kinderman.

In Class 6, Jacek Szmidt secured pole position but lost to Jerzy Mazur at the start. On the fourth lap, while attempting to pass Mazur, a V-belt snapped in Szmidt's car, and the driver was forced to retire from the race. Behind Mazur, the race was finished by Stefan Banaszak and Hieronim Kochański (MTX 1-03). Before the final round, Mazur was the favorite for the title: winning the championships would require him to finish at least seventh in Poznań if Szmidt won.

Jerzy Krotoski, who secured pole position in Class 7, led the race until the fourth lap. He was then overtaken by Mariusz Podkalicki, who went on to win the race. Krotoski finished second, and Ryszard Zygmunt (Promot 82) third. By securing second place, Krotoski earned his second Formula Polonia title – he had won his first in 1982.

An additional handicap race for touring cars (Classes 1–5) was also organized in Kielce – the Grand Prix of the Świętokrzyskie Mountains. Adam Polak, Bogdan Wozowicz, and Dariusz Kinderman stood on the podium. The winners received Elf brand motor oil as a prize (30, 20, and 10 liters, respectively).

Class	1st place	2nd place	3rd place
1	Jacek Chojnacki (Fiat 126p)	Zbyszko Gaik (Fiat 126p)	Zdzisław Brymora (Fiat 126p)
2	Dariusz Kinderman (Fiat 126p)	Wojciech Smorawiński (Fiat 126p)	Sławomir Kruk (Fiat 126p)
3	Tomasz Barański (Fiat 126p)	Wojciech Cołoszyński (Fiat 126p)	Adam Sowa (Fiat 126p)
4	Wacław Janowski (Zastava 1300)	Adam Polak (Polish Fiat 125p 1500)	Andrzej Mielcarek (Zastava 1300)
5	Bogdan Wozowicz (Ford Escort 2000)	Adam Polak (Polish Fiat 125p 1500)	Piotr Nowicki (Polish Fiat 125p)
6	Jerzy Mazur (MTX 1-06)	Stefan Banaszak (Promot 83)	Hieronim Kochański (MTX 1-03)
7	Mariusz Podkalicki (Promot 76)	Jerzy Krotoski (Promot 82)	Ryszard Zygmunt (Promot 82)

=== Round 5: Poznań ===
The Poznań round was the final race of the 1984 Polish Car Racing Championships season, held on 6–7 October. As with the first Poznań round, the race distance for all classes was 40.850 km.

Jacek Chojnacki, who had already secured the title in Kielce, took pole position in Class 1. He maintained the lead until the first lap, after which he was overtaken by Zdzisław Brymora. On the third lap, Leszek Wojdaliński took the lead. Chojnacki regained the lead on the fourth lap, but two laps later he was overtaken by Brymora. On the eighth lap, Chojnacki took the lead for the third time and won the race ahead of Zbyszek Gaik and Krzysztof Witt. Less than two seconds separated the top five at the finish line.

Piotr Kolasiński secured pole position in Class 2. He led the race until the second lap. On the third lap, Wojciech Smorawiński overtook him and went on to win the race. Dariusz Kinderman finished behind Smorawiński and Kolasiński.

In Class 3, Tomasz Barański secured pole position. However, Włodzimierz Krukowski took the lead at the start of the race and held it until the finish. Barański finished second, and Wojciech Cołoszyński third, thereby becoming the Class 3 champion.

Adam Polak won the qualifying session in Class 4. At the start of the race, Henryk Mandera took the lead, but Polak regained it on the second lap and remained in the lead until the finish. Mandera finished second, and Wacław Janowski third, defending the championship title he had won the previous year.

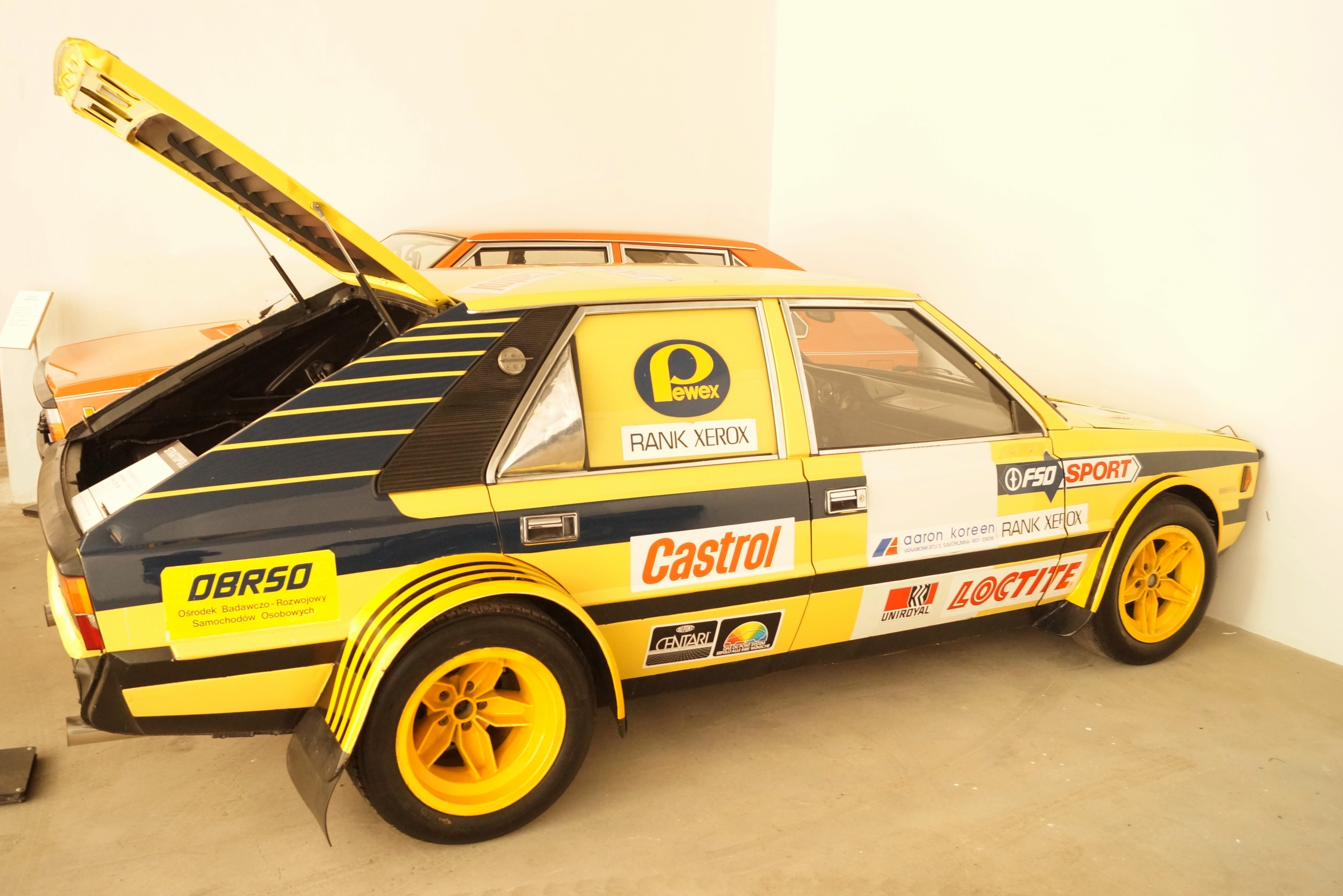
During the fifth qualifying round of the 1984 Polish Car Racing Championships (Poznań II), a Polonez 2500 driven by Marian Bublewicz entered the race

Marian Bublewicz entered the Poznań qualifying round in a Polonez 2500, colloquially known as the "Stratopolonez", equipped with a 2.5-liter Lancia Stratos engine. Bublewicz did not participate in the practice session, which was won by Adam Polak. Starting from last place, Bublewicz overtook all his competitors on the very first lap and took the lead, which he maintained until the finish line. Jerzy Dyszy (Lada), who finished second, was 4.2 seconds behind Bublewicz, although Bublewicz maintained that he had tried to drive slowly because his time would determine the handicap level for the Poznań Grand Prix scheduled later. However, Bublewicz did not earn any points in the Polish Car Racing Championships because his vehicle, classified as a domestic-foreign prototype, did not comply with Class 5 regulations. Formally, therefore, Dyszy claimed the victory, ahead of Edward Kinderman and Andrzej Kleina. Kinderman won the championship, as his rival for the title, Maciej Bogusławski, dropped out of the race due to a car failure.

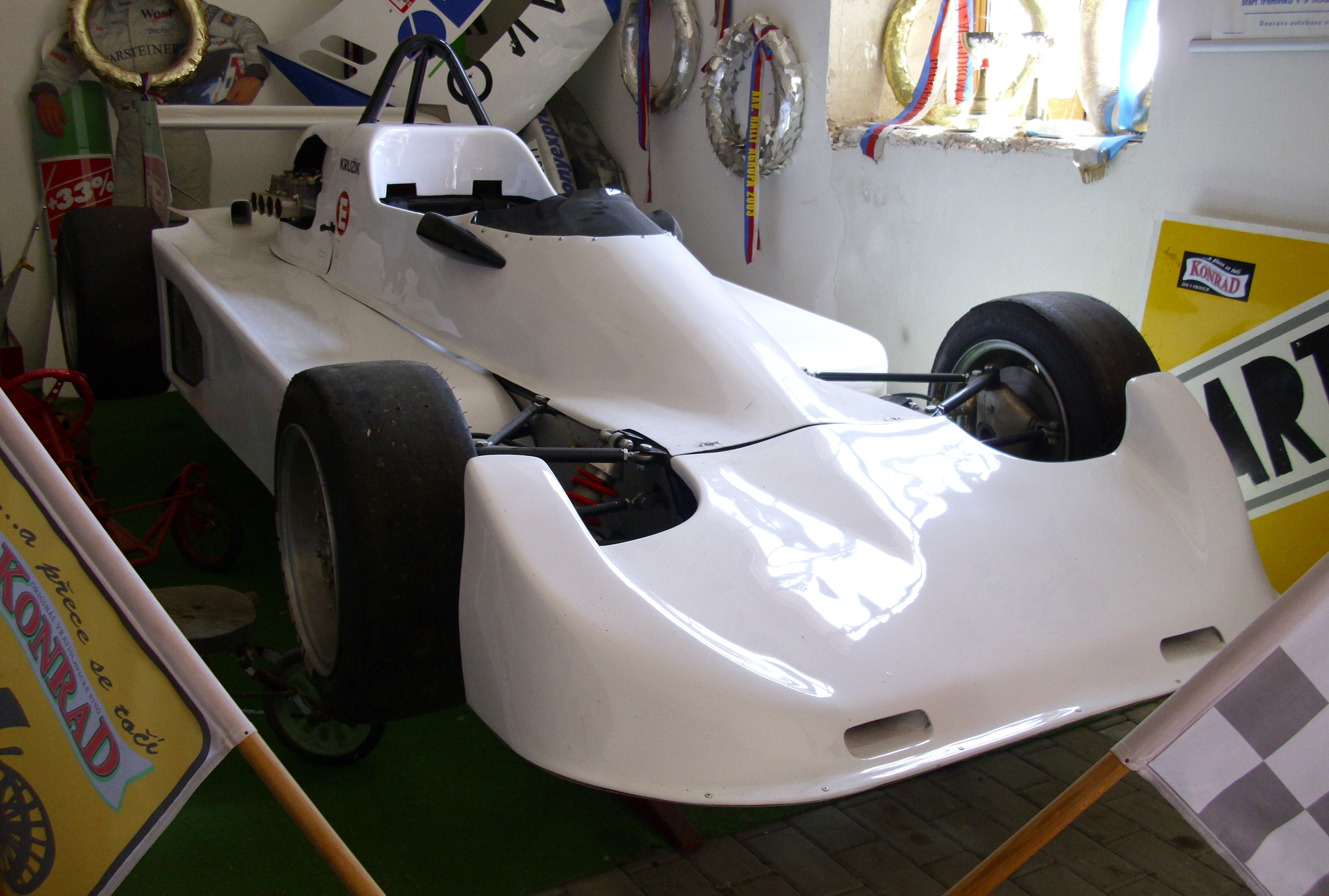
MTX 1-06 – the car in which Jerzy Mazur won the Class 6 championships

In Class 6, the pole position was secured by the championship leader, Jerzy Mazur, while his rival in the title race, Jacek Szmidt, started from seventh place. After the start, Mazur maintained the lead, and Szmidt moved up to fifth place. However, later in the race, due to a clutch failure, Szmidt pulled into the pit stop, where it took the mechanics one and a half laps to repair the problem. Meanwhile, on the third lap, Mazur lost the lead to Stefan Banaszak and was later overtaken by Andrzej Wojciechowski as well. Thus, Banaszek, Wojciechowski, and Mazur stood on the podium, marking the first victory for a Polish car (Promot) in the national Formula Easter series in 1984. Szmidt finished in 11th place, which meant that Jerzy Mazur won the Class 6 championship.

Mariusz Podkalicki secured the pole position in Class 7. He maintained the lead on the first lap. Polish champion Jerzy Krotoski, who started from fourth place, overtook Podkalicki on the second lap. On the eighth lap, Podkalicki regained the lead because Krotoski suffered a tire failure and withdrew from the race. Podkalicki won, with Grzegorz Kamiński and Ryszard Zygmunt rounding out the podium.

Warsaw Automobilklub, with 143 points, won the team classification in Poznań. However, the team championship title was won by Greater Poland Automobilklub.

The organizers of the qualifying rounds in Poznań also held the Poznań Grand Prix, a handicap race for classes 1–5 over a distance of ten laps. The advantage of the lower classes was determined by the times achieved during regular races. Thus, class 2 started 114 seconds after class 1. Class 3 started 54 seconds later. Class 4 started 3 minutes and 50 seconds after Class 1, and Class 5 started four seconds later. Marian Bublewicz started 5 minutes and 44 seconds after Class 1. Bublewicz won the race, ahead of Polak and Krukowski.

Class	1st place	2nd place	3rd place
1	Jacek Chojnacki (Fiat 126p)	Zbyszko Gaik (Fiat 126p)	Krzysztof Witt (Fiat 126p)
2	Wojciech Smorawiński (Fiat 126p)	Piotr Kolasiński (Fiat 126p)	Dariusz Kinderman (Fiat 126p)
3	Włodzimierz Krukowski (Fiat 126p)	Tomasz Barański (Fiat 126p)	Wojciech Cołoszyński (Fiat 126p)
4	Adam Polak (Polish Fiat 125p 1500)	Henryk Mandera (Lada 1300)	Wacław Janowski (Zastava 1300)
5	Jerzy Dyszy (Lada)	Edward Kinderman (Polonez Prototype 1800)	Andrzej Kleina (Opel Kadett)
6	Stefan Banaszak (Promot 83)	Andrzej Wojciechowski (Promot 76)	Jerzy Mazur (MTX 1-06)
7	Mariusz Podkalicki (Promot 76)	Grzegorz Kamiński (Promot 82)	Ryszard Zygmunt (Promot 82)

== Reception ==
Janusz Śmiłowski, editor of Sport, criticized the short, 40-kilometer race distances in the Polish Car Racing Championships, arguing that this diminished the appeal of the qualifying rounds. According to Śmiłowski, another problem was the lack of adequate promotion of the races themselves, as well as the location of the tracks far from city centers. In the editor's view, the multitude of classes did not positively highlight the competition among the race cars, which, after all, were participating in the Cup of Peace and Friendship. Śmiłowski criticized the engines used in the race cars, which were about 20 hp weaker than those of foreign rivals participating in the Cup of Peace and Friendship; the use of such engines stemmed from the fact that the Poles learned too late about the new regulations, which allowed for greater modification of Lada engines. Among the positive aspects of the Polish Car Racing Championships, Śmiłowski highlighted the excitement surrounding the races (despite the short distances) and the turnout of fans. In his summary of the 1984 season, Śmiłowski noted that Jacek Szmidt, considered the favorite in Class 6, failed to win the championship due to several unfortunate races (Toruń, Kielce II, Poznań II). In Class 5, the editor of Sport pointed out the unreliability of Maciej Bogusławski's MB-03 and the consistency of Edward Kinderman, thanks to which he won the title despite failing to win a single round. Śmiłowski named Stefan Banaszak and Mariusz Podkalicki as the season's breakthrough riders.

Zbigniew Kulczyński, an employee of the Technical and Supply Center that manufactured Promot cars, pointed out the poor condition of the equipment during the 1984 season. Kulczyński, like Śmiłowski, criticized the engines used in the race cars and also noted that the drivers themselves were modifying the engines. Kulczyński also stated that obtaining parts such as bolts or bearings was a problem, and that securing optimal tires posed an additional challenge, as Barum tires were in short supply in Poland.

Jacek Szmidt, however, noted that one of the problems was the safety of Polish tracks, which prevented drivers from safely exiting them in the event of an accident. In the case of the track in Kielce, Szmidt also pointed to the lack of run-off areas as a problem.

== Standings ==
Colour	Result
Gold	Winner
Silver	Second place
Bronze	Third place
Green	Points classification
Blue	Non-points classification
Blue	Non-classified finish (NC)
Purple	Retired, not classified (Ret)
Red	Did not qualify (DNQ)
Red	Did not pre-qualify (DNPQ)
Black	Disqualified (DSQ)
White	Did not start (DNS)
White	Withdrew (WD)
White	Race cancelled (C)
Blank	Did not practice (DNP)
Blank	Did not arrive (DNA)
Blank	Excluded (EX)

- **Bold** – Start from pole position
- Italics – Fastest lap of the race
- † – Did not finish, but classified after completing more than 90% of the race distance
- * – Season in progress
- 1/2/3 – Points-scoring position in the sprint

=== Drivers ===
==== Class 1 ====
Pos.	Driver	Team	Car	No.	Poznań	Kielce	Toruń	Kielce	Poznań	Points
1	Jacek Chojnacki	Warsaw Automobilklub	Fiat 126p	014	3	1	**1**	**1**	**1**	200
2	Zbyszko Gaik	Greater Poland Automobilklub	Fiat 126p	023	**1**	2	4	2	2	188
3	Zdzisław Brymora	Częstochowa Automobilklub	Fiat 126p	07	2	3	2	3	4	178
4	Leszek Wojdaliński	Warsaw Automobilklub	Fiat 126p	016	6	17	3	5	5	162
5	Robert Herba	Silesian Automobilklub	Fiat 126p	018	4	8	6	4	7	159
6	Sławomir Zagórski	Silesian Automobilklub	Fiat 126p	031	5	4	NC	6	6	159
7	Krzysztof Witt	Greater Poland Automobilklub	Fiat 126p	022	7	9	8	10	3	154
8	Adam Mazurek	Warsaw Automobilklub	Fiat 126p	011	10	13	7	7	9	147
9	Jacek Iwański	Warsaw Automobilklub	Fiat 126p	034	–	11	9	8	11	141
10	Bogusław Chałupnik	Beskids Automobilklub	Fiat 126p	017	11	7	10	12	–	140
11	Bogumił Kut	Silesian Automobilklub	Fiat 126p	020	14	DSQ	12	14	14	126
12	Henryk Wiśniak	Rzemieślnik Automobilklub	Fiat 126p	027	–	16	11	15	16	122
13	Witold Paradowski	Częstochowa Automobilklub	Fiat 126p	036	9	10	DSQ	9	–	107
14	Andrzej Kopczyński	Łódź Automobilklub	Fiat 126p	047	–	DSQ	14	13	13	95
15	Mirosław Świejkowski	Toruń Automobilklub	Fiat 126p	025	8	DSQ	5	DSQ	–	77
16	Andrzej Martynkin	Rzemieślnik Automobilklub	Fiat 126p	08	–	15	NC	–	8	67
16	Sławomir Wysmyk	Łódź Automobilklub	Fiat 126p	010	–	NC	DSQ	11	12	67
18	Piotr Tonderski	Rzemieślnik Automobilklub	Fiat 126p	05	13	12	–	–	–	65
19	Jarosław Jankun	Silesian Automobilklub	Fiat 126p	019	12	14	–	–	–	64
20	Krzysztof Mieszczański	Kalisz Automobilklub	Fiat 126p	02	17	NC	15	DSQ	–	58
21	Krzysztof Winkowski	Warsaw Automobilklub	Fiat 126p	012	–	5	NC	–	–	40
22	Robert Krotoski	Greater Poland Automobilklub	Fiat 126p	015	NC	6	NC	–	–	39
23	Krzysztof Bociąga	Rzemieślnik Automobilklub	Fiat 126p	049	–	–	–	–	10	35
24	Bogdan Ślęga	Rzemieślnik Automobilklub	Fiat 126p	04	–	–	13	–	–	32
25	Leszek Grynhoff	Greater Poland Automobilklub	Fiat 126p	021	15	–	–	–	–	30
25	Andrzej Habas	Silesian Automobilklub	Fiat 126p	033	–	–	DSQ	NC	15	30
27	Ireneusz Trzeszczkowski	Toruń Automobilklub	Fiat 126p	09	16	**NC**	DSQ	DSQ	–	29
NC	Jerzy Janik	Beskids Automobilklub	Fiat 126p	024	NC	–	–	–	–	0
NC	Włodzimierz Pawluczuk	Rzemieślnik Automobilklub	Fiat 126p	03	–	–	NC	–	–	0
NC	Krzysztof Caputa	Beskids Automobilklub	Fiat 126p	038	–	–	NC	–	–	0

==== Class 2 ====
Pos.	Driver	Team	Car	No.	Poznań	Kielce	Toruń	Kielce	Poznań	Points
1	Dariusz Kinderman	Silesian Automobilklub	Fiat 126p	190	2	**1**	**1**	1	3	196
2	Piotr Kolasiński	Greater Poland Automobilklub	Fiat 126p	158	5	2	4	5	**2**	173
3	Krzysztof Caputa	FSM Bielsko – Beskids Automobilklub	Fiat 126p	109	4	3	2	9	4	171
4	Antoni Skudło	Silesian Automobilklub	Fiat 126p	123	10	5	9	8	5	153
5	Stanisław Dawid	Częstochowa Automobilklub	Fiat 126p	149	8	DSQ	10	4	6	152
6	Wojciech Smorawiński	Greater Poland Automobilklub	Fiat 126p	125	–	–	3	**2**	1	139
7	Jerzy Wierzbołowski	Lower Silesian Automobilklub	Fiat 126p	177	1	4	NC	NC	8	128
8	Waldemar Mrówczyński	Greater Poland Automobilklub	Fiat 126p	119	23	NC	6	15	15	121
9	Jarosław Koziczak	Greater Poland Automobilklub	Fiat 126p	108	NC	–	5	10	7	113
10	Zbigniew Kordek	Beskids Automobilklub	Fiat 126p	128	3	NC	13	NC	10	110
11	Zbigniew Czarnocki	Warsaw Automobilklub	Fiat 126p	153	16	NC	7	NC	11	101
12	Włodzimierz Pawluczuk	Rzemieślnik Automobilklub	Fiat 126p	103	11	–	19	NC	9	96
13	Wojciech Ryszewski	Włocławek Automobilklub	Fiat 126p	131	21	DSQ	11	11	–	92
14	Andrzej Grabowski	Morski Automobilklub	Fiat 126p	122	18	–	NC	14	16	87
15	Piotr Rakowski	Cieszyn Automobilklub	Fiat 126p	132	–	–	8	7	–	75
16	Sławomir Kruk	Świętokrzyski Automobilklub	Fiat 126p	140	19	NC	–	3	–	69
17	Tadeusz Suchoń	Rzemieślnik Automobilklub	Fiat 126p	143	17	–	–	6	–	67
18	Andrzej Pięta	Łódź Automobilklub	Fiat 126p	173	6	DSQ	21	NC	–	63
19	Marek Greszta	Lower Silesian Automobilklub	Fiat 126p	118	–	–	17	12	–	61
20	Angelo Gilli	Beskids Automobilklub	Fiat 126p	107	15	DSQ	16	NC	–	59
21	Ireneusz Trzeszczkowski	Toruń Automobilklub	Fiat 126p	09	24	DSQ	–	NC	13	53
21	Andrzej Martynkin	Rzemieślnik Automobilklub	Fiat 126p	08	–	–	20	–	17	53
23	Bogdan Pawlak	Warsaw Automobilklub	Fiat 126p	110	**7**	NC	–	–	–	38
24	Jacek Marcinkiewicz	Silesian Automobilklub	Fiat 126p	144	9	DSQ	–	–	–	36
25	Piotr Polak	Beskids Automobilklub	Fiat 126p	165	12	–	–	–	–	33
25	Tadeusz Kotas	Cieszyn Automobilklub	Fiat 126p	159	–	DSQ	12	NC	–	33
25	Krzysztof Winkowski	Warsaw Automobilklub	Fiat 126p	116	–	NC	NC	–	12	33
28	Paweł Puchalski	Warsaw Automobilklub	Fiat 126p	130	13	NC	–	–	–	32
28	Marek Przybyła	Beskids Automobilklub	Fiat 126p	102	–	DSQ	–	13	–	32
30	Andrzej Chełstowski	Szczecin Automobilklub	Fiat 126p	141	14	–	–	–	–	31
30	Bogdan Ślęga	Rzemieślnik Automobilklub	Fiat 126p	04	–	–	14	NC	–	31
30	Bogumił Kut	Silesian Automobilklub	Fiat 126p	020	–	–	–	–	14	31
33	Jacek Chojnacki	Warsaw Automobilklub	Fiat 126p	014	–	–	15	–	–	30
34	Mariusz Stuszewski	Warsaw Automobilklub	Fiat 126p	179	–	–	18	NC	–	27
34	Mario Stula	Silesian Automobilklub	Fiat 126p	148	–	NC	NC	NC	18	27
36	Witold Witkowski	Szczecin Automobilklub	Fiat 126p	142	20	DSQ	–	–	–	25
37	Andrzej Polkowski	Lublin Automobilklub	Fiat 126p	198	22	DSQ	–	–	–	25
38	Kazimierz Krawczyk	Zielona Góra Automobilklub	Fiat 126p	121	25	–	–	–	–	25
NC	Jacek Czyżewski	Rzemieślnik Automobilklub	Fiat 126p	133	NC	DSQ	NC	NC	–	0
NC	Jarosław Adamiak	Szczecin Automobilklub	Fiat 126p	156	NC	–	–	–	–	0
NC	Bogusław Pająk	Szczecin Automobilklub	Fiat 126p	169	NC	–	–	–	–	0
NC	Robert Gajór	Morski Automobilklub	Fiat 126p	199	NC	–	–	–	–	0
NC	Robert Herba	Silesian Automobilklub	Fiat 126p	018	–	NC	–	–	–	0
NC	Piotr Zuber	Beskids Automobilklub	Fiat 126p	112	–	DSQ	NC	–	–	0
NC	Grzegorz Grabowski	Warsaw Automobilklub	Fiat 126p	145	–	NC	–	–	–	0
NC	Andrzej Stachurski	Lublin Automobilklub	Fiat 126p	196	–	NC	–	–	–	0

==== Class 3 ====
Pos.	Driver	Team	Car	No.	Poznań	Kielce	Toruń	Kielce	Poznań	Points
1	Wojciech Cołoszyński	Warsaw Automobilklub	Fiat 126p	294	3	NC	2	**2**	3	178
2	Tomasz Barański	Łódź Automobilklub	Fiat 126p	203	2	NC	14	1	**2**	173
3	Andrzej Godula	Kraków Automobilklub	Trabant 600	257	4	1	16	4	–	161
4	Zbigniew Zapędowski	Łódź Automobilklub	Fiat 126p	254	NC	5	3	7	10	156
5	Witalis Misiewicz	Lublin Automobilklub	Fiat 126p	146	–	10	6	5	7	152
6	Zbigniew Szwagierczak	Greater Poland Automobilklub	Fiat 126p	227	19	3	NC	6	4	149
7	Włodzimierz Krukowski	Świętokrzyski Automobilklub	Fiat 126p	266	**1**	**4**	NC	NC	1	141
7	Wojciech Ryszewski	Włocławek Automobilklub	Fiat 126p	131	NC	12	4	10	13	141
9	Piotr Zuber	Beskids Automobilklub	Fiat 126p	112	–	11	5	19	5	140
10	Włodzimierz Pawluczuk	Rzemieślnik Automobilklub	Fiat 126p	103	10	7	13	11	–	139
11	Adam Michalski	Warsaw Automobilklub	Fiat 126p	253	17	13	8	14	11	134
12	Andrzej Stachurski	Lublin Automobilklub	Fiat 126p	196	–	14	9	13	12	132
13	Michał Adamski	Łódź Automobilklub	Fiat 126p	256	6	6	NC	–	6	117
14	Marian Czapka	Cieszyn Automobilklub	Fiat 126p	214	NC	–	12	8	8	107
15	Adam Sowa	Rzemieślnik Automobilklub	Fiat 126p	217	NC	NC	1	3	–	93
15	Iwona Mianowska	Kraków Automobilklub	Fiat 126p	287	–	NC	11	16	15	93
17	Witold Witkowski	Szczecin Automobilklub	Fiat 126p	142	16	17	15	–	–	87
18	Kazimierz Sołtowski	Szczecin Automobilklub	Trabant 600	260	12	2	–	–	–	79
19	Tadeusz Bryczek	Beskids Automobilklub	Fiat 126p	226	7	9	–	NC	–	74
20	Marek Greszta	Lower Silesian Automobilklub	Fiat 126p	118	–	–	10	–	14	66
21	Jerzy Wierzbołowski	Lower Silesian Automobilklub	Fiat 126p	177	5	20	DNF	–	–	65
21	Mirosław Krachulec	Częstochowa Automobilklub	Fiat 126p	252	8	–	17	–	–	65
23	Paweł Puchalski	Warsaw Automobilklub	Fiat 126p	130	14	19	–	–	–	57
23	Andrzej Polkowski	Lublin Automobilklub	Fiat 126p	198	15	18	–	–	–	57
25	Andrzej Grabowski	Morski Automobilklub	Fiat 126p	122	NC	–	NC	18	16	56
26	Krzysztof Winkowski	Warsaw Automobilklub	Fiat 126p	116	–	NC	7	–	–	38
27	Dariusz Kinderman	Silesian Automobilklub	Fiat 126p	190	–	8	NC	–	–	37
28	Piotr Polak	Beskids Automobilklub	Fiat 126p	165	9	–	–	–	–	36
28	Tadeusz Suchoń	Rzemieślnik Automobilklub	Fiat 126p	143	–	–	–	9	–	36
28	Wojciech Urbański	Silesian Automobilklub	Fiat 126p	270	–	–	NC	–	9	36
31	Stanisław Dawid	Częstochowa Automobilklub	Fiat 126p	149	11	NC	–	–	–	34
32	Angelo Gilli	Beskids Automobilklub	Fiat 126p	107	–	–	NC	12	–	33
33	Andrzej Chełstowski	Szczecin Automobilklub	Fiat 126p	141	13	–	–	–	–	32
34	Sławomir Kruk	Świętokrzyski Automobilklub	Fiat 126p	140	NC	15	–	–	–	30
34	Tadeusz Kotas	Cieszyn Automobilklub	Fiat 126p	159	–	–	NC	15	–	30
36	Klaudiusz Rak	Silesian Automobilklub	Fiat 126p	238	–	16	NC	–	–	29
37	Mario Stula	Silesian Automobilklub	Fiat 126p	148	–	–	NC	17	–	28
38	Jacek Czyżewski	Rzemieślnik Automobilklub	Fiat 126p	133	18	NC	NC	NC	–	27
NC	Zbigniew Kordek	Beskids Automobilklub	Fiat 126p	128	NC	NC	NC	–	–	0
NC	Robert Gajór	Morski Automobilklub	Fiat 126p	199	NC	–	–	–	–	0
NC	Mirosław Kordek	Beskids Automobilklub	Fiat 126p	220	NC	NC	–	–	–	0
NC	Antoni Skudło	Silesian Automobilklub	Fiat 126p	123	–	–	NC	–	–	0
NC	Piotr Kolasiński	Greater Poland Automobilklub	Fiat 126p	158	–	–	NC	–	–	0
NC	Jacek Niglus	Silesian Automobilklub	Fiat 126p	230	–	–	NC	–	–	0
NC	Andrzej Kowalski	Kraków Automobilklub	Fiat 126p	244	–	–	NC	NC	–	0
NC	Bogusław Ejsmont	Szczecin Automobilklub	Fiat 126p	269	–	–	NC	–	–	0
NC	Andrzej Lasek	Kraków Automobilklub	Fiat 126p	271	–	–	–	NC	–	0

==== Class 4 ====
Pos.	Driver	Team	Car	No.	Poznań	Kielce	Toruń	Kielce	Poznań	Points
1	Wacław Janowski	Lower Silesian Automobilklub	Zastava 1300	4	**NC**	**1**	1	1	3	193
2	Andrzej Mielcarek	Greater Poland Automobilklub	Zastava 1300	29	1	2	2	3	–	185
3	Henryk Mandera	Silesian Automobilklub	Lada 1300	8	2	3	NC	**6**	2	174
4	Marek Kozłowski	Lublin Automobilklub	Lada 1300	9	5	5	3	NC	4	164
5	Krzysztof Godwod	Rzemieślnik Automobilklub	Polski Fiat 125p	19	4	4	9	4	6	164
6	Andrzej Bajuk	Włocławek Automobilklub	Polski Fiat 125p	2	–	6	5	9	8	152
7	Jerzy Bekas	Greater Poland Automobilklub	Polski Fiat 125p	5	10	7	6	8	–	149
8	Adam Polak	Warsaw Automobilklub	Polish Fiat 125p 1500	16	3	NC	**NC**	2	**1**	139
9	Władysław Starkowski	Lower Silesian Automobilklub	Zastava 1100	31	6	NC	8	NC	5	116
10	Czesław Trzeszczkowski	Toruń Automobilklub	Polski Fiat 125p	36	12	–	4	7	–	112
11	Andrzej Krzywda	Silesian Automobilklub	Polski Fiat 125p	17	9	8	NC	10	–	108
12	Wiesław Wielochowski	Warsaw Automobilklub	Polski Fiat 125p	91	–	8	NC	10	–	73
13	Stanisław Polkowski	Lublin Automobilklub	Polski Fiat 125p	23	7	11	–	–	–	72
14	Tadeusz Kudłaty	Lower Silesian Automobilklub	Polski Fiat 125p	6	8	NC	–	11	–	71
15	Romuald Chałas	Warsaw Automobilklub	Polski Fiat 125p	88	11	9	–	–	–	70
16	Zbigniew Janiec	Piotrków Automobilklub	Polski Fiat 125p	21	–	–	–	5	–	40
17	Andrzej Kutelski	Szczecin Automobilklub	Polish Fiat 125p 1500	32	–	–	–	–	7	38
NC	Piotr Nowicki	Greater Poland Automobilklub	Polski Fiat 125p	1	NC	NC	–	–	–	0
NC	Ryszard Kozłowski	Lublin Automobilklub	Lada 1300	3	–	NC	–	–	–	0

==== Class 5 ====
Pos.	Driver	Team	Car	No.	Poznań	Kielce	Toruń	Kielce	Poznań	Points
1	Edward Kinderman	Silesian Automobilklub	Polonez Prototype 1800	51	**5**	2	2	NC	2	178
2	Piotr Nowicki	Greater Poland Automobilklub	Polish Fiat 125p 1500	1	3	–	4	3	6	166
3	Jerzy Dyszy	Rzemieślnik Automobilklub	Polish Fiat 125p 1500; Lada	60	6	8	6	NC	1	165
4	Andrzej Pazdor	Kraków Automobilklub	Prototype 1500	65	NC	6	5	7	7	155
5	Maciej Bogusławski	Rzemieślnik Automobilklub	MB-03	43	1	**1**	**NC**	**4**	NC	141
6	Andrzej Kleina	AMK Drwęca	Opel Kadett	52	2	3	NC	–	3	132
7	Adam Polak	Warsaw Automobilklub	Polish Fiat 125p 1500	16	–	NC	1	2	–	96
8	Stanisław Polkowski	Lublin Automobilklub	Polish Fiat 125p	23	8	5	–	–	–	77
9	Janusz Podleśny	Lublin Automobilklub	Polish Fiat 125p	7	–	9	–	–	5	76
10	Włodzimierz Pawluczuk	Rzemieślnik Automobilklub	Fiat 126p 800	103	–	–	7	8	–	75
11	Bogdan Wozowicz	KS Maraton Warszawa	Ford Escort 2000		–	–	–	1	–	50
12	Grzegorz Niśkiewicz	Łódź Automobilklub	Opel Manta E	57	–	–	3	–	–	43
13	Wacław Janowski	Lower Silesian Automobilklub	Zastava 1300	4	4	NC	NC	–	–	41
13	Władysław Starkowski	Lower Silesian Automobilklub	Zastava 1300	31	–	4	NC	–	–	41
13	Jerzy Franek	Cieszyn Automobilklub	Lada 1600 MTX	72	–	–	–	–	4	41
16	Tadeusz Kudłaty	Lower Silesian Automobilklub	Polish Fiat 125p 1500	6	–	NC	–	5	–	40
17	Mieczysław Dymek	Kraków Automobilklub	Prototype 1300	66	–	–	NC	6	–	39
18	Andrzej Krzywda	Silesian Automobilklub	Polish Fiat 125p 1500	17	7	NC	–	NC	–	38
18	Adam Sowa	Rzemieślnik Automobilklub	Fiat 126p 1500	217	–	7	NC	–	–	38
20	Robert Moritz	Warsaw Automobilklub	Lada 1600	68	9	NC	–	–	–	36
20	Marek Kozłowski	Warsaw Automobilklub	Lada 1300	9	NC	–	–	9	–	36
NC	Ryszard Granica	Cieszyn Automobilklub	Lada 1600 MTX	69	–	NC	–	–	–	0
NC	Włodzimierz Krukowski	Kielce Automobilklub	Fiat 126p	266	–	NC	–	–	–	0
NC	Mirosław Krachulec	Częstochowa Automobilklub	Ford Escort 2000	22	–	–	–	NC	–	0

==== Class 6 ====
Pos.	Driver	Team	Car	No.	Poznań	Kielce	Toruń	Kielce	Poznań	Points
1	Jerzy Mazur	Lower Silesian Automobilklub	MTX 1-06	3	8	1	1	1	**3**	193
2	Stefan Banaszak	Szczecin Automobilklub	Promot 83	10	3	3	2	2	1	185
3	Jacek Szmidt	Toruń Automobilklub	MTX 1-06	5	**1**	**2**	**3**	NC	11	173
4	Józef Kiełbania	Świętokrzyski Automobilklub	MTX 1-06	2	2	12	5	5	4	167
5	Hieronim Kochański	Warsaw Automobilklub	MTX 1-03	6	6	NC	4	3	5	163
6	Tomasz Szczęsny	Warsaw Automobilklub	Promot 83	17	NC	10	10	7	6	147
7	Marek Kostikow	Greater Poland Automobilklub	Promot 79	23	10	8	13	10	–	139
8	Romuald Chałas	Warsaw Automobilklub	Promot 79	14	13	9	12	11	–	135
9	Piotr Zaleski	Morski Automobilklub	Promot 83	8	4	–	6	4	–	121
10	Tomasz Jeromin	Świętokrzyski Automobilklub	Promot 79	4	5	5	8	NC	–	117
11	Piotr Lenartowicz	Świętokrzyski Automobilklub	Promot 79	15	9	NC	–	6	7	113
12	Lech Wojciechowski	Kalisz Automobilklub	Promot 83	18	12	NC	9	8	–	106
13	Andrzej Sumara	Morski Automobilklub	MTX 1-03	11	7	11	NC	13	–	104
14	Ryszard Plucha	Warsaw Automobilklub	Promot 77	13	–	–	14	9	10	102
15	Zbigniew Pokorski	Świętokrzyski Automobilklub	Promot 76	24	11	13	NC	12	–	99
16	Andrzej Wojciechowski	Silesian Automobilklub	Promot 83	9	–	–	7	NC	2	84
17	Witold Nalewaj	Szczecin Automobilklub	MTX 1-03	7	NC	7	11	–	–	72
18	Józef Gutmacher	Silesian Automobilklub	Promot 76	21	NC	4	15	–	–	71
19	Marek Obarski	Greater Poland Automobilklub	Promot 79	19	NC	14	NC	–	9	67
20	Marek Głowacki	Szczecin Automobilklub	Promot 76; Promot 83	16	–	6	NC	–	–	39
21	Mariusz Podkalicki	Szczecin Automobilklub	MTX 1-03	7	–	–	–	–	8	37
22	Andrzej Kuchta	Beskids Automobilklub	Promot 69	26	–	–	–	–	12	33
23	Jan Kościuszko	Kraków Automobilklub	Promot 70	20	–	15	–	–	–	30

==== Class 7 ====
Pos.	Driver	Team	Car	No.	Poznań	Kielce	Toruń	Kielce	Poznań	Points
1	Jerzy Krotoski	Greater Poland Automobilklub	Promot 82	60	**1**	**1**	**1**	**2**	NC	196
2	Mariusz Podkalicki	Szczecin Automobilklub	Promot 76	48	3	2	–	1	**1**	189
3	Tomasz Sikora	Świętokrzyski Automobilklub	Promot 82	57	5	6	2	5	–	165
4	Ryszard Zygmunt	Morski Automobilklub	Promot 82	54	4	NC	7	3	–	165
5	Piotr Górecki	Morski Automobilklub	Promot 77	41	13	8	3	6	6	158
6	Janusz Orłowski	Szczecin Automobilklub	OPO5 83	58	6	7	4	7	–	156
7	Eugeniusz Zarzycki	Rzemieślnik Automobilklub	Promot 81	51	NC	4	16	4	5	151
8	Jarosław Podsiadło	Świętokrzyski Automobilklub	Promot 75	44	7	NC	9	8	8	148
9	Marek Oryński	Kraków Automobilklub	Promot 77	46	–	9	5	12	7	147
10	Kazimierz Sołtowski	Szczecin Automobilklub	Promot 82	47	10	10	6	11	–	143
11	Artur Skwarzyński	Rzemieślnik Automobilklub	Promot 82	56	11	–	14	10	4	141
12	Artur Makowski	Świętokrzyski Automobilklub	Promot 76	45	17	12	15	14	11	128
13	Grzegorz Kamiński	Toruń Automobilklub	Promot 82	55	9	–	DSQ	9	2	118
14	Andrzej Proć	Częstochowa Automobilklub	Promot 81	52	NC	NC	13	13	9	100
15	Mirosław Kłoda	Świętokrzyski Automobilklub	Promot 76	63	–	11	11	15	–	98
16	Marek Bogusz	Kalisz Automobilklub	Promot 77	42	18	–	10	16	–	91
17	Andrzej Wojciechowski	Silesian Automobilklub	Promot 76	65	2	5	NC	–	–	86
18	Eugeniusz Kulawik	Silesian Automobilklub	Promot 76	53	8	3	NC	NC	–	80
19	Tomasz Osterloff	Toruń Automobilklub	Promot 75	43	15	NC	8	NC	–	67
20	Dariusz Nowaczyński	Greater Poland Automobilklub	Promot 77	61	–	NC	12	17	–	61
21	Krzysztof Kotowicz	Greater Poland Automobilklub	Promot 74	64	NC	NC	NC	–	10	35
22	Andrzej Grochowski	Warsaw Automobilklub	Promot 81	49	12	–	–	–	–	33
22	Robert Gajór	Morski Automobilklub	Promot 76	65	–	–	–	NC	12	33
24	Aleksander Majerczak	Greater Poland Automobilklub	Promot 75	62	14	–	–	–	–	31
25	Wojciech Skowroński	Toruń Automobilklub	Promot 81	50	16	–	NC	–	–	29

== Bibliography ==
- Chyła, Grzegorz (2015). Polskie wyścigi samochodowe 1980–1989 [Polish Motor Racing 1980–1989] (in Polish). Toruń: Automobilklub Toruński. ISBN 978-83-942405-0-9.
- Steć, Robert (2011). Polskie samochody wyścigowe [Polish Racing Cars] (in Polish). Opole: Studio conTEXT. ISBN 978-83-930306-4-4.
