= Rak 650 =

Polish racing car

- Category: Polish Motor Racing Championships
- Designer(s): Jerzy Jankowski
- Successor: Rak 1300

Technical specifications
- Chassis: Truss of steel tubes, aluminium body
- Suspension (front): Transverse control arms, coil spring, Girling oil shock absorber
- Suspension (rear): Longitudinal control arms, coil spring, Girling oil shock absorber
- Engine: Triumph T110 0.65 I2
- Transmission: NSU

Competition history
- Notable drivers: Jerzy Jankowski
- Debut: Polish Motor Racing Championships 1958 in Łódź
| Races | Wins | Poles | F/Laps |
|---|---|---|---|
| 12 | 8 | Unknown | Unknown |

Rak 650 was a Polish racing car designed and built in 1957 by Jerzy Jankowski under the Rak brand. Jankowski also served as its driver. Powered by a 0.65-litre Triumph engine, the car competed primarily in the Polish Motor Racing Championships, securing two Polish championship titles for Jankowski in 1958. After the 1959 season, Jankowski modified the car, which was raced as the Rak 1300 from 1961.

== Background ==
Jerzy Jankowski, a constructor and former motorcycle racer, ended his racing career in 1953 after a severe leg injury sustained during the International Six Days Enduro in Czechoslovakia. While recovering in hospital, he designed a racing motorcycle named Moto-Rak, inspired by his zodiac sign, Cancer. The Moto-Rak, equipped with a 125 cm³ engine and an innovative frame and fairing design, never raced, and development ceased in 1958. In October 1957, Jankowski became head of the Performance Car Development Centre in Warsaw.

During this period, the Polish Motor Racing Championships featured vehicles known as SAMs, amateur-built cars often based on pre-World War II components. The SAM concept originated from a 1952 competition by the automotive magazine Motor, encouraging the construction of custom vehicles. The first racing SAM, built by Marian and Stanisław Wierzba, used parts from a Lancia Aprilia. Other constructors, including Michał Nahorski and Wiesław Gawron, followed suit. SAM drivers dominated the Polish championships from 1953 to 1960. These vehicles competed in the championships until 1964.

In this context, Jankowski conceived the idea of building Poland's first purpose-built racing car, independent of specific formula racing requirements. At the time, Europe widely hosted the affordable Formula Three, which used motorcycle-derived engines, often from motorcycle speedway. Plans for similar championships existed in Poland, with debates over whether new cars should adhere to Formula Three or the emerging Formula Junior specifications. Regardless, Jankowski opted for a lightweight space frame design, powered by a motorcycle engine and using minimal production car components. By 1957, the car's design was nearly complete. The chassis was built by late 1957, and the car was finished in early 1958. Alongside Jankowski, Krzysztof Brun (who contributed to the bodywork), Zbigniew Kulczyński, and Jerzy Przybysz assisted in its development. Named "Rak" after the zodiac sign shared by its creators, the car was intended as a testbed for innovative solutions.

== Engine and transmission ==
The Rak 650 was powered by a Triumph engine from the Triumph T110, producing approximately 45 hp. The engine was rigidly mounted on the right side of the frame, near the driver's arm, to minimize vibrations typical of such units. The engine was unmodified except for the addition of two Amal R27 carburetors, replacing the single carburetor of the original design. To further reduce vibrations, the carburetors' float chambers were mounted separately on the frame and connected by flexible tubing. Persistent vibrations initially caused bodywork cracks, prompting Jankowski to mount the engine in rubber-metal bushings, which resolved the issue.

The transmission was sourced from an NSU motorcycle, with the clutch derived from a JAP speedway motorcycle clutch. Gear changes were facilitated by a tubular linkage.

The car lacked a differential. Instead, it used a magnesium alloy rear axle housing containing two ball bearings supporting rotating sleeves. These sleeves were connected to the rear half-shafts, a chain sprocket, and a brake drum.

== Chassis and suspension ==
The Rak 650's truss was constructed from steel tubes alloyed with chromium and molybdenum, with main tubes having a 1.5 mm wall thickness. The frame's triangular design ensured high rigidity, weighing 21.5 kg. The body was made of aluminium, featuring deep front cutouts for aerodynamic efficiency. Two openings in the front fenders, covered with thin rubber film, allowed telescopic tubes to extend beyond the fender profile during maximum suspension compression. The body consisted of two detachable sections for easy disassembly. The dashboard included a tachometer, oil pressure gauge, and oil temperature indicator.

The front suspension comprised transverse control arms paired with telescopic tubes connected by a piston pin. The tubes were mounted at the top in a sliding sleeve, secured with a silentblock in V-shaped frame extensions. The wheel steering knuckles were attached to the tubes via kingpins. Coil spring, housing the telescopic tubes, and Girling oil shock absorber served as the damping elements, providing a 120 mm suspension travel.

The rear suspension featured wheels mounted on open, single-joint half-shafts guided by longitudinal control arms. These used identical damping components to the front, with a 130 mm travel. Lateral forces were transmitted directly through the half-shafts to the bearings of the chain-driven rear axle housing.

The dual-circuit brake system included two brake pumps positioned ahead of the driver's pedals, operated via an adjustable yoke to modify brake balance. The front wheels used 250 mm aluminium drum brakes based on the Fiat 1100, with ventilation holes and aluminium air scoops for cooling. The rear wheels shared a single brake operating through the half-shafts.

The steering system used a rack and pinion from an IFA F8, driving two equal-length tie rods. The steering wheel, sourced from DKW, was removable.

The car had two fuel tanks: a 25-litre main tank behind the driver's seat and a header tank behind the driver's head. A mechanical fuel pump, driven by a pushrod and shock absorber arm, transferred fuel from the main to the header tank, which fed the carburettors; excess fuel returned to the main tank. The oil tank, located under the passenger seat, was connected to the engine via an oil filter.

The front track was 1,200 mm, the rear 1,100 mm, and the wheelbase 2,100 mm. The 15-inch wheels, sourced from the Fiat 1100, contributed to the car's dry weight of 280 kg.

Although regulations required a two-seat configuration, the Rak 650's engine, drivetrain, and centrally positioned pedals allowed easy conversion to a single-seater. Only one Rak 650 was built.

== Racing history ==
=== 1958 ===
Assigned the number 74 in the Polish Motor Racing Championships, the Rak 650, driven by Jerzy Jankowski, debuted on 22 June 1958 in Łódź. In the 750 cm³ class, Jankowski finished second behind Longin Bielak's SAM, but won the 1,300 cm³ class. On 13 July in Opole, despite practice issues, Jankowski won both classes and set the fastest lap in the 1,300 cm³ race. He skipped the third round in Warsaw on 28 September. On 26 October in Częstochowa, Jankowski won both classes, achieving an average speed of 125.4 km/h in the 750 cm³ race and a national record of 133 km/h in the 1,300 cm³ race, securing Polish championship titles in both classes.

On 10 August 1958, Jankowski and Bielak competed in an international race in Budapest, with Jankowski driving the Rak 650 and Bielak a Krab. As the only 750 cm³ cars, they faced stronger competitors, including Milivoj Božić's Porsche 1500 RS and single-seater Škodas. Jankowski secured pole position but fell back due to clutch issues at the start. Bielak led until his Krab's transmission failed. Jankowski overtook the Škodas of Václav Čížkovský and Václav Bobek but, hampered by a deflating rear tyre, finished second behind Božić.

=== 1959 ===
Before the 1959 season, the Polish Motor Racing Championships eliminated class divisions. Modifications to the Rak 650 included moving the steering wheel forward, replacing front shock absorbers, separating suspension coil springs, and adding an air duct to improve engine cooling and reduce drag. The duct, positioned near the driver's right arm, covered the passenger area. Higher side body panels, higher pistons, and alcohol-blended fuel increased engine power to 60 hp, though this fuel was not always permitted.

Jankowski won the season's first race on 7 June in Opole and the subsequent race in Lublin. On 20 September in Wrocław, Rudolf Wrocławski won, with Jankowski finishing sixth. The final round on 11 October in Częstochowa included three heats. A spark plug failure affected the first heat, but Jankowski set the fastest lap and finished third in the second. He earned the Polish vice-championship, behind Wrocławski, and won an international race in Budapest.

== Later history ==
After two years of racing, the Rak 650's engine and body required repairs. To enhance competitiveness, Jankowski rebuilt it with two Triumph T110 engines linked to a Wartburg transmission, achieving approximately 100 hp and a top speed of 200 km/h. This necessitated repositioning the driver, altering the chassis and bodywork. The modified car, named Rak 1300 (also referred to as Rak 2T or Rak T2), debuted in the 1961 season on 21 May in Opole, where Jankowski won. He also won another Opole race, defeating East German drivers Max Byczkowski and Heinz Melkus in Melkus cars. Jankowski finished second in the 1961 championship. In 1962, Władysław Paszkowski drove the Rak 1300, winning in Kraków and finishing second in Szczecin. In 1963, Zbigniew Sucharda drove the car, but a fuel line failure during the Lublin race caused a fire, severely damaging the vehicle. Due to new regulations introduced after 1964, it was not rebuilt.

The car's whereabouts were unknown until around 1996, when the Rak 1300 was discovered in a chicken coop near Radom. It had been modified for road use, with provisions for lighting, a Syrena drivetrain, and a widened frame centre. In the early 2000s, it was offered for sale. In 2010, Robert Steć purchased it, restored the chassis, and planned to return it to its original configuration.

== Bibliography ==
- Steć, Robert (2011). Polskie samochody wyścigowe [Polish Racing Cars] (in Polish). Opole: Studio conTEXT. ISBN 978-83-930306-4-4.
