= Toruń Airport =

Toruń Airport Port Lotniczy Toruń
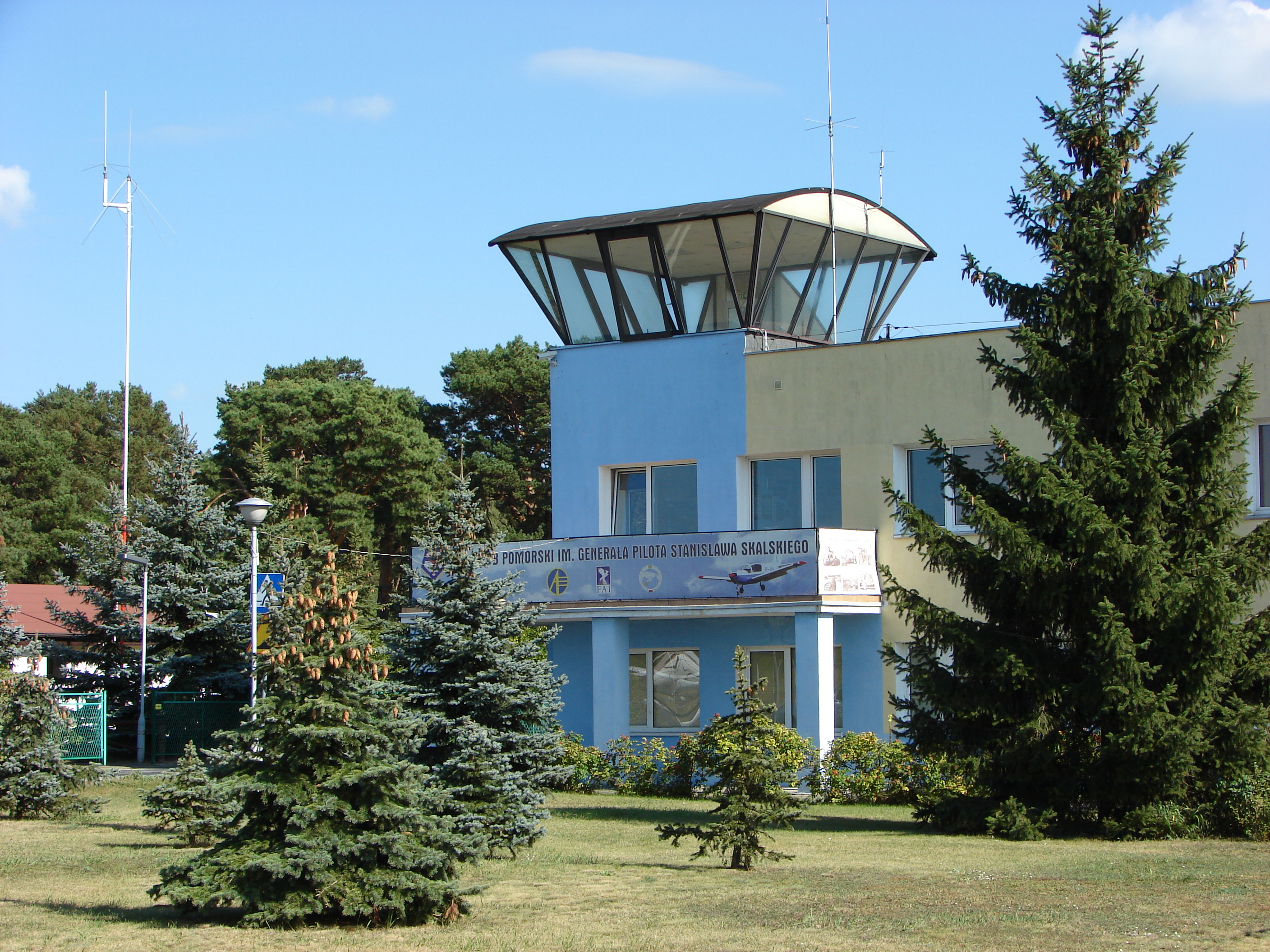
- IATA: none; ICAO: EPTO

Summary
- Airport type: Public
- Owner: Aeroklub Toruń
- Serves: Toruń, Poland
- Coordinates: 53°01′45″N 18°32′45″E

Map
- Location of airport in Poland

Runways
Direction	Length		Surface
Direction	m	ft	Surface
0	1,300	4,100	Concrete

Statistics (2007 +/- change from 2006)
- Passengers: 0
- Cargo (in tons): 0
- Takeoffs/Landings: 0
- Source: Polish AIP at EUROCONTROL

Toruń is a city of 209 thousand inhabitants (0,6 million in a two-city agglomeration). The airport in Toruń already possesses a runway of 4100 ft. There is pressure from local politicians to adapt the local airport to serve domestic flights, and, after expanding the landing strip by (version 1–200 meters, version II- 500) meters to over (v.I- 1500 meters, version II-2000 meters), also international flights to this tourist destination; due to its unique gothic-styled city-centre, it is on the UNESCO world heritage list and is one of the favourite Polish tourist destinations.

== History ==
The airport was opened before World War I in 1912-1913. It served military purposes.

The third round of the 1984 Polish Car Racing Championships season took place at the Toruń airport circuit on 1–2 September.

== Airport infrastructure ==
There exists a railroad line nearby the terminal that can be used for passenger service.
