= Promot =

Polish motorcycle and race car manufacturer

- Industry: Automotive
- Headquarters: Warsaw, Poland
- Area served: Poland
- Products: Motorcycles, open-wheel cars
- Parent: Ośrodek Techniczno-Zaopatrzeniowy

Promot was a motorcycle and race car manufacturer based in Warsaw, Poland, that operated from 1967 to 1986. It belonged to Ośrodek Techniczno-Zaopatrzeniowy. Promot manufactured competition, rally, and motocross motorcycles, as well as open-wheel cars.

== History ==
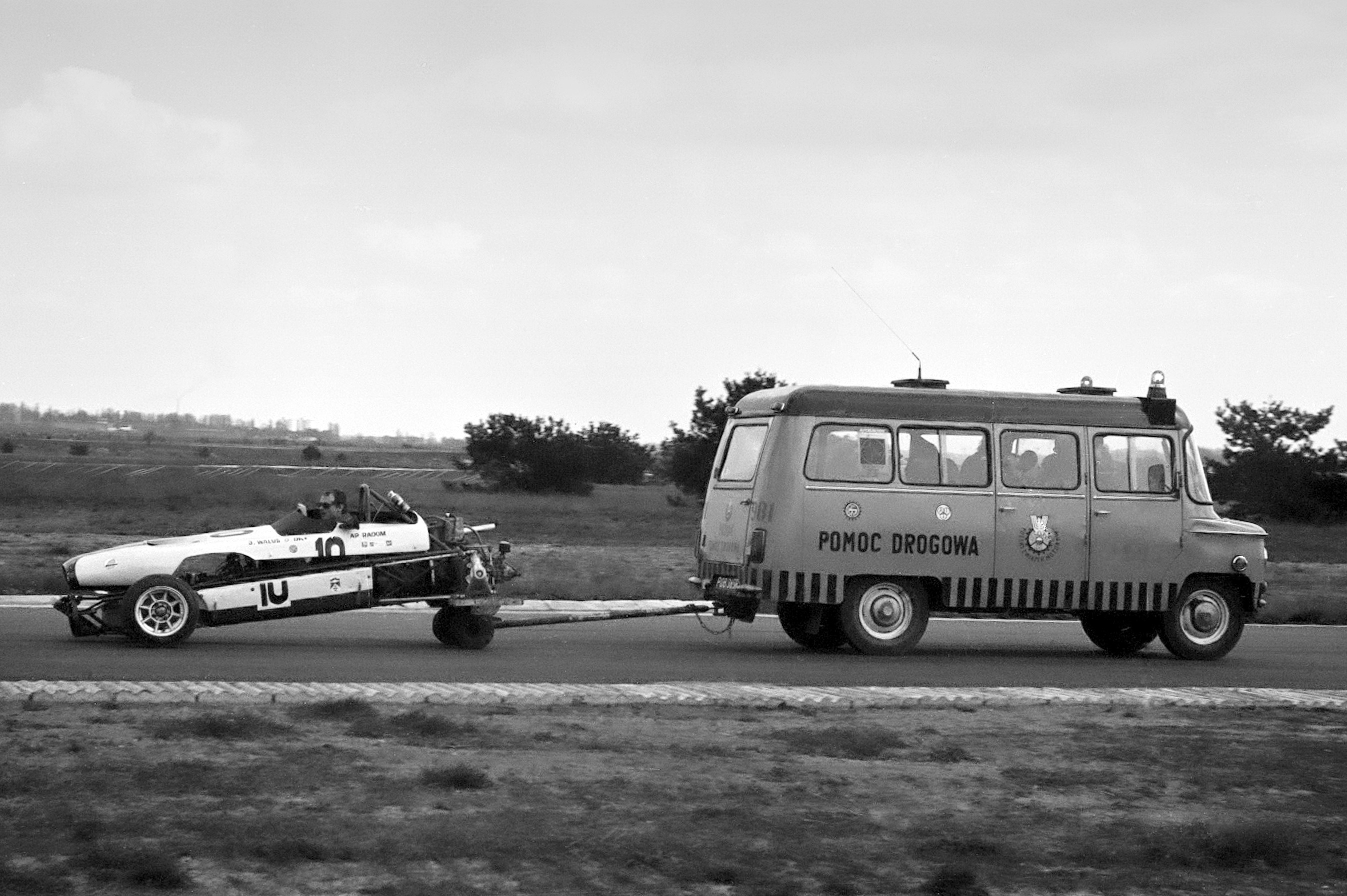
Promot-Rak 67 towed by ZSD Nysa van in 1980 at Poznań Racetrack.

Promot was operated by Ośrodek Techniczno–Zaopatrzeniowy based in Warsaw, Poland. It manufactured competition, rally, (Junior 250) and motocross (MR and MC) motorcycles with 175, 250, and 300 cm^{3} engines. In 1967, it manufactured its first open-wheel race car, Promot-Rak 67. In 1970 it began development of the prototype racing cars for Formula Polonia. The first car for that series was Promot Polonia I, which manufacture began in 1974. In 1979 the company presented the next series of that car, Promot II, which could race in Formula Polonia and Formula Easter races. In 1984, it presented the third series of the car, Promot III, which was manufactured until 1986, and was the last open-wheel car manufactured by a Polish-based company. In total 62 Promot cars had been manufactured.

== Vehicle models ==
=== Motorcycles ===
- Promot Junior 250
- Promot MC
- Promot MR
- Promot NC 125

=== Race cars ===
- Promot-Rak 67
- Promot Polonia I
- Promot II
- Promot III

== Citations ==
=== Bibliography ===
- Robert Steć: Polskie samochody wyścigowe. Opole: Studio ConTEXT, 2011, ISBN 978-83-930306-4-4.
- Mała Encyklopedia Sportu, Warsaw: Wydawnictwo Sport i Turystyka, 1984
