= Jerzy Jankowski =

Racing designer and driver (1920–1986)

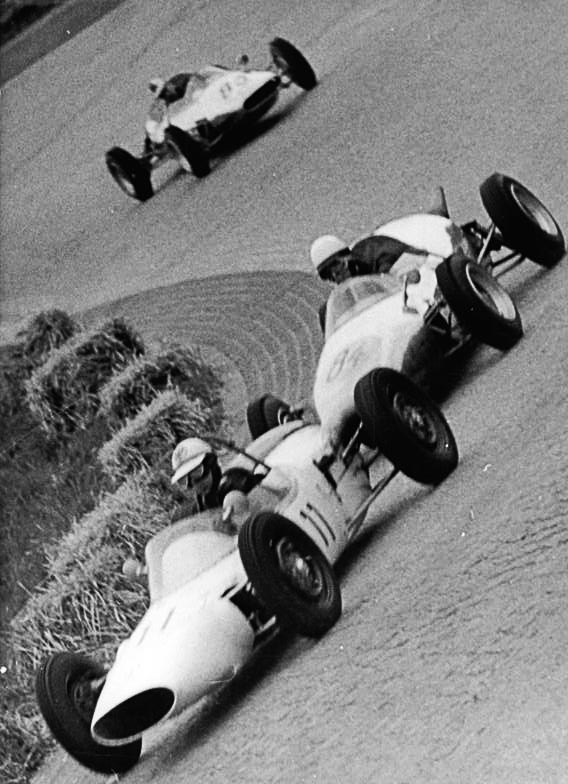
- Born: 4 July 1920; Będzin
- Died: 27 November 1986 (aged 66); Warsaw
- Occupations: Motorcycle designer and racer; car designer and racing driver

Jerzy Jankowski was a Polish motorcycle and car racer/designer.

== Early life ==
He was born in 1920 in Będzin. In 1936 he started racing racing motorcycles in the colors of the Pogoń Dąbrowa Górnicza club. Then he raced in the colors of Polonia Bytom and Legia Warsaw. In 1939 he modified the DKW RT3 motorcycle, which was described by the magazine Motorcycle and Cyclecar.

== Career ==
=== Motorcycling ===
In 1947 he won the gold medal in the Six-Day Race. In the same year he organized a sports team of the SHL plant. In 1948, together with the team, he won the International Motorcycle Marathon, organized in Poland and Czechoslovakia. After working for SHL, he found employment at WFM. There he co-created sports motorcycles and the WFM Osa scooter.

In 1953, he ended his career as a motorcycle racer due to a serious leg injury sustained on the Sześciodniówka. During his stay in hospital, Jankowski developed a prototype of the Moto-Rak motorcycle, which did not go into production.

=== Driving career and engineering ===
In October 1957, he became the head of the Centre for the Construction of Performance Cars. During this period, Jankowski developed the first Polish racing car built from scratch, designated Rak 650. This vehicle, based on a lightweight space frame, was powered by a Triumph engine. In 1958, Jankowski won the Polish Championship title with this vehicle.

In 1959 he won the Budapest Grand Prix. During this period he began developing a car compliant with Formula Junior regulations – Rak Junior I. In 1963 he co-initiated the Cup of Peace and Friendship, which was held until 1990, in which drivers from socialist countries competed.

After the international regulations changed from Formula Junior to Formula 3 after 1963, Jankowski began developing a car to that specification. The result was the Rak 64, with which Jankowski won the Polish championship title in 1964 and the inaugural Cup of Peace and Friendship. In 1966, he won the race at the Strahov Stadium. After 1966, Jankowski ended his racing career. The last racing car he designed was the Promot-Rak 67.

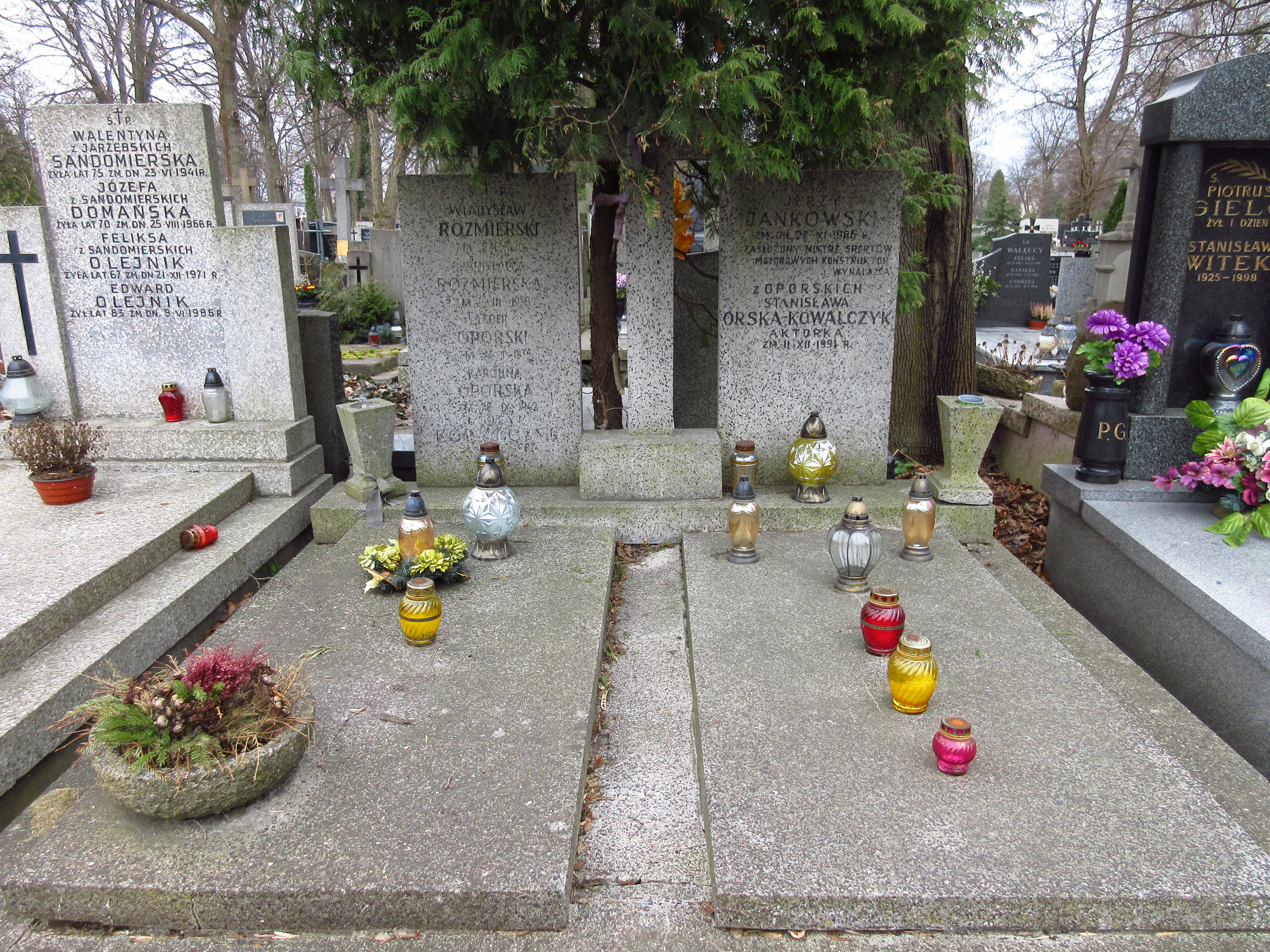
The grave of Jerzy Jankowski at the Bródnowski Cemetery (right).

In total, Jankowski was the author of 23 racing motorcycle and car designs and 19 patents. In the years 1950–1953 he was the Polish champion and vice-champion ten times in motorcycle racing, and was also a three-time Polish champion in auto racing.

== Death ==
He died on 27 November 1986. He was buried at the Bródnowski Cemetery in Warsaw, Poland.
