= Zastava Skala =

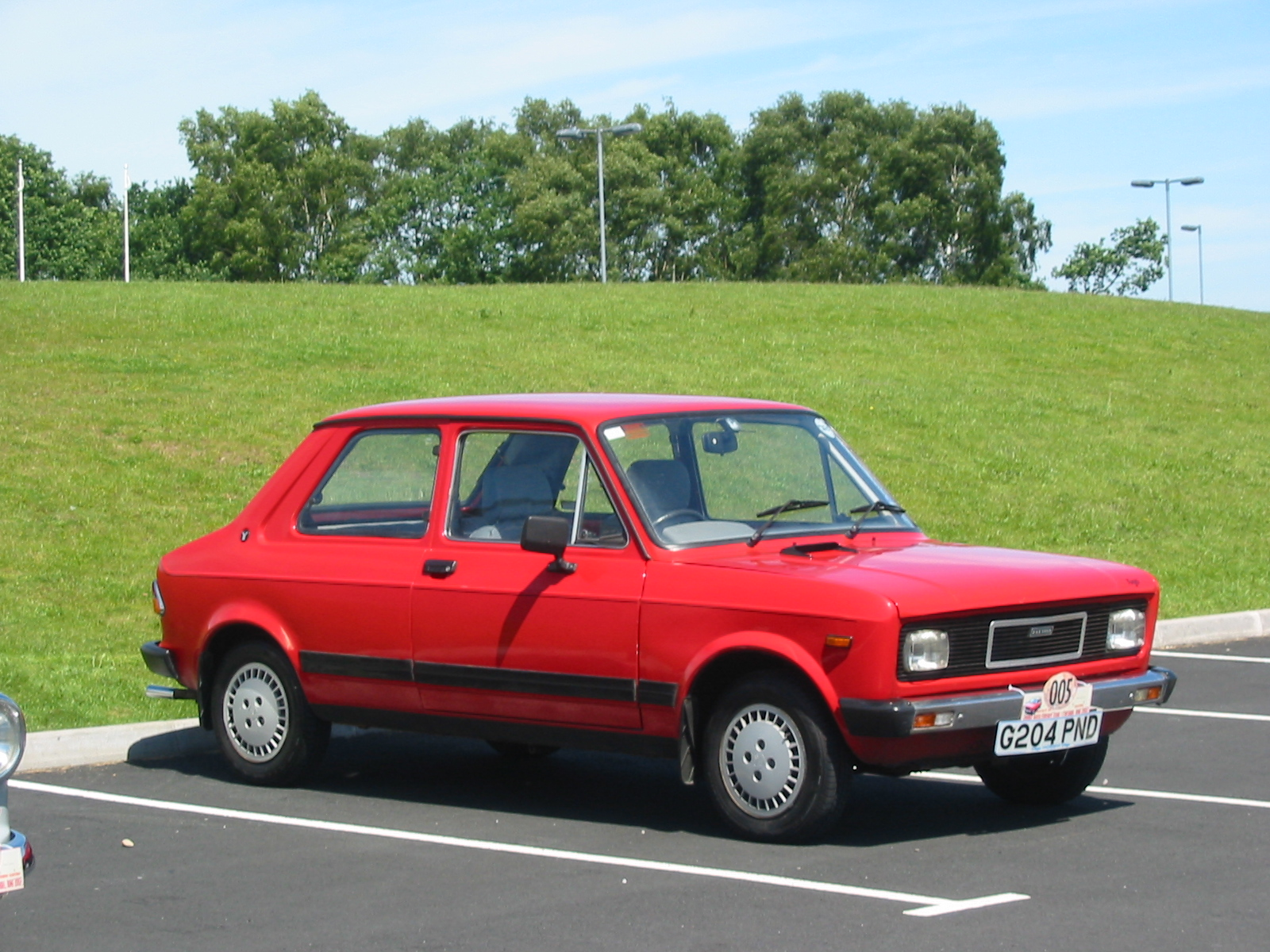
- 1989 Yugo 311 (UK)

Overview
- Manufacturer: Zastava
- Also called: Zastava 101; Zastava 1100/1300; Zastava GTL; Yugo 311-513 (UK); Yugo Skala; Fiat 128 Z (Finland only)
- Production: 15 October 1971 – 20 November 2008 (limited production up until December 2010 at Zastava Special Automobiles)
- Assembly: Yugoslavia / Serbia: Kragujevac

Body and chassis
- Class: Small family car
- Body style: 3/5-door liftback 2-door pick-up
- Related: Fiat 128

Powertrain
- Engine: 1.1 L SOHC I4; 1.3 L SOHC I4
- Transmission: 4/5-speed manual

Zastava Skala (pronounced [ˈzâːstaʋa ˈskǎːla]), also known as Yugo Skala (pronounced [ˈjûɡo ˈskǎːla]), is a generic name for a family of cars built by Yugoslav and then Serbian, manufacturer Zastava Automobili. Based on the Fiat 128 sedan, it was introduced in 1971 and sold as a 3 or 5-door liftback, a style that had not been issued or manufactured in Italy and was specifically targeted for the Balkan market, under the names Zastava 101, Zastava 1100, Zastava 1300, Zastava GTL, Yugo Skala 55c and Yugo Skala 65c.

Later in 1979 it became available as a 4-door sedan, identical to the Fiat 128 but sold under the name Zastava 128. The Zastava 128 model was discontinued in 2003. In its domestic market, the Zastava 101 was widely known by the nicknames "Stojadin" (pronounced [stoˈjǎdin], a male name, from the similarity with Serbo-Croatian for 101, "sto jedan") and (in Slovenia) "Stoenka" ("101-ette").

In the final years of production, the Zastava Skala was available in a single trim level: the 55-horsepower, 1.1-liter, 5-door Skala 55. In 2008, a new Skala could be purchased for just under 4,000 euros, undercutting the Zastava Koral (an ameliorated Yugo).

Production of the Zastava Skala continued for some time after the discontinuation of the Zastava 128. The Skala features a fifth door, making it impressively functional at this price level. Dropping down the rear seat increases the cargo space from 325 to 1,010 liters. Due to its practicality and robustness, and thanks to its low price, the Skala 55 continued to sell well in Serbia until the end of production in 2008. 1,273,532 units have been built since 1971. Zastava in late 2007 estimated that the Skala 55 was the world's second most-affordable car at the time.

== Brief history ==
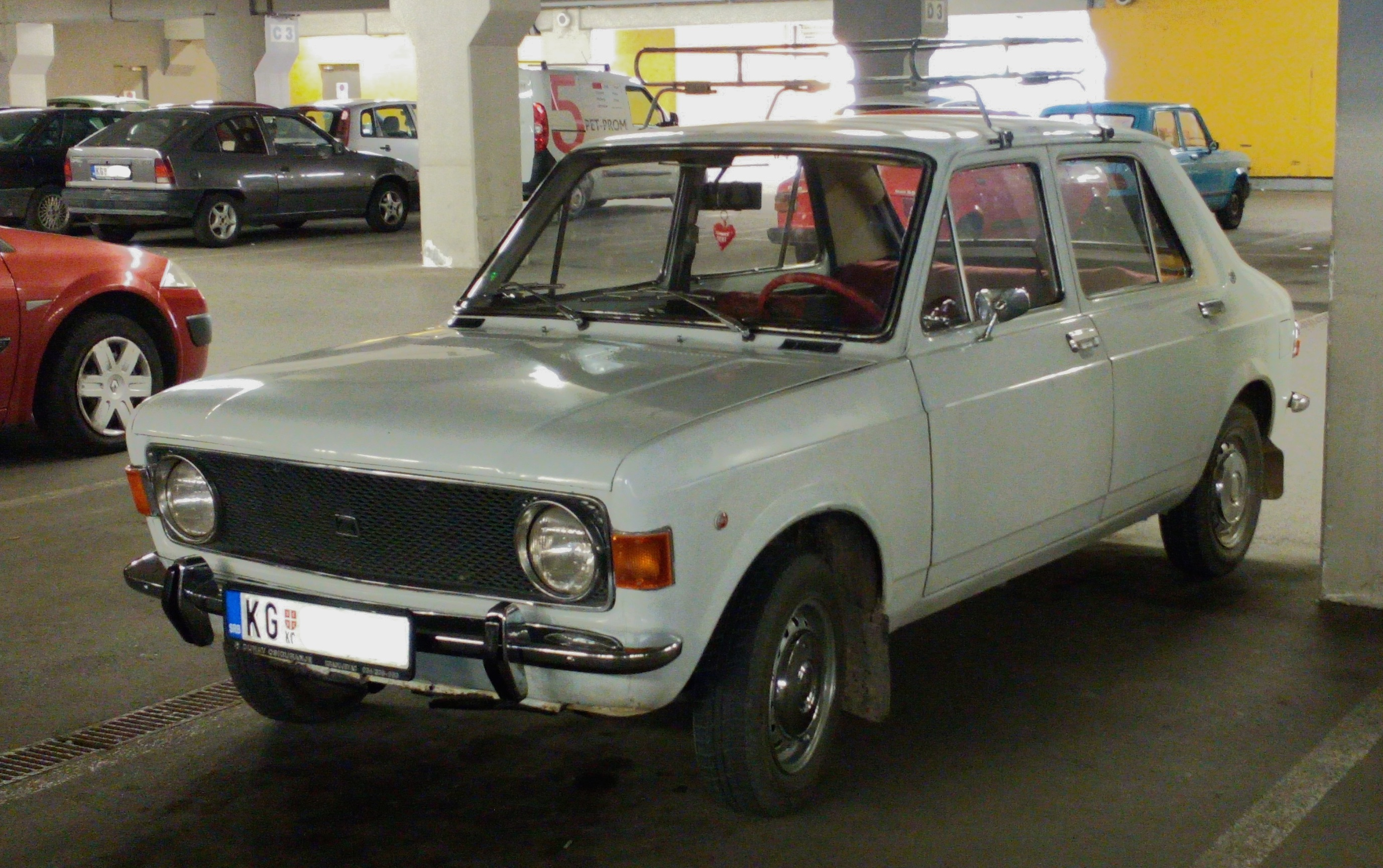
Early model with round headlights and chromed bumpers

The Skala 55 first emerged on 15 October 1971 as the Zastava 101 (internationally, the Zastava 1100 or 311/ 313/ 511/ 513). Derived from Italy's Fiat 128, which Zastava also produced (Zastava 128), the 101 added a practical fifth door.

Arriving a full three years before Fiat's own 128 3P and Volkswagen's Golf, the 101 was among the first hatchbacks with engine and gearbox located astride each other. Front-wheel-drive in an era when most manufacturers were still years away from making the switch, the 101 offered excellent space utilization. Independent rear suspension coped well with challenging Eastern European roads, while engines designed by the legendary Aurelio Lampredi worked best at heady rpms.

In 1973, the Zastava 101 won its class in the 17th international Tour d'Europe rally. The following year, Yugoslav driver J. Paliković was reportedly piloting his 101 faster than his Porsche competition over several stages.

In February 1975, Zastava organized an expedition from its hometown of Kragujevac to Kilimanjaro. Five brand-new, standard Zastava 101 cars and 11 crew members travelled African deserts and savanna, finishing their 45-day expedition on the top of Kilimanjaro. Zastava consequently markets the car as Vozilo uspeha (roughly translated, vehicle of success). In Poland, the FSO factory produced the Zastava 101 through 1976. In 1979, 88,918 Zastava 101 models left Kragujevac lines. Two years later, the car had been crowned Yugoslavia's Car of the Decade.

The early 1980s saw the 101 become quite popular in the United Kingdom, where the cars were aimed squarely at the budget end of the market. Advertised under the slogan Go New! Go Yugo!, the 311/ 313/ 511/ 513 is the cheapest new car available to British buyers. In 1984, the range's entry-level model costs less than £2,400, roughly half the price of the equivalent Ford Escort. In order to avoid rust caused by road gritting, hard PVC coating was used throughout the underside, sills and valances. In 1991, the millionth 101 (Yugo Skala) was produced.

=== Improvements for 2008, end ===
At the 2008 Belgrade Car Show, Zastava showed a revised Skala 55, next to the Zastava Koral, Zastava 10, and the new Florida TDC diesel. Under the hood, a new aluminum radiator had been installed. New wheel bearings and CV joints came from the Zastava 10. Behind the wheel was a new instrument cluster, complete with tachometer, in a new, more rounded housing. New, softer seats provided a higher driving position. The 2008 Yugo Skala 55 also shared a horn, adjustable side mirrors, and rear-view mirror with the Zastava 10. The door locks came from Zastava's In (Zastava Koral and Zastava Florida) range; owners finally received a single key to operate the doors and ignition.

Optionally, the 101 Yugo Skala 55 could be equipped to run on natural gas, with a factory-installed Lovato 40-liter tank and feed. The Skala 55 was Serbia's most-affordable automobile, but production ended November 20, 2008. This was the 1,045,258th Zastava 101 built, making for a total of 1,273,532 Fiat 128-based Zastavas (including 228,274 Zastava 128s).

== Complete model break-down ==
In the beginning, two versions of the Zastava 101 were available: Standard and De Luxe. Standard models offered seats trimmed in imitation black leather, with a black, spherical gear shifter. De Luxe trim brought forth red seats and carpet, chrome trim across the interior door panels and exterior sides of the car, and imitation wood ahead of the front passenger. Zastava's logo was embedded within a transparent shifter knob.

The following years saw the radiator grille painted black (rather than grey). In 1976, the 101L replaced the De Luxe model, featuring new bumpers with rubber trim, flat-folding seat backs, chrome-trimmed radiator grille, reverse light, electric windshield-washer pump, coolant-temperature gauge, cigarette lighter and servo brakes.

All models used a 1,116 cc engine, with an 8.8:1 compression ratio and various carburetors (Weber 32 icev 10, Holley Europea 32 ICEV 10, IPM 32 MGV 1 or Solex C 32 DISA 20). In 1976, all engines - beginning with #0076986 - used a new camshaft, 20-millimeters wide to the outgoing camshaft's 14-millimeter width. No further significant changes were made until 1979, when the Zastava 101B replaced the Standard model. Both the 101B and 101L now shared the same, upmarket seats, with integrated headrests. Zastava 101 L 1300 was the first model with an engine of 1290 cc and 73 hp (54 kW), with an original Italian gearbox (Fiat 128 Coupe). Produced in small number of exemplars.

Also in 1979, Zastava launched the 101S (Super) and SC (Super Confort). They had new bumpers, square headlamps, a new radiator grille with chrome surround, black side mirror, black wipers, small black wheel caps, standard rear defroster and two new warning lamps (hand-brake on, brake-pad warning). Interior colors were added, as was a new, 1,290 cc engine, featuring 9.1:1 compression and an IPM 32 MGV 25/250 carburetor. The SC model used a two-barrel Weber 30/32 DMTR 90/250 carburetor and 4-2-1 exhaust, boosting power to 64 hp (48 kW).

Compression on the 1,116 cc engine was raised to 9.2:1. The motor now used an IPM 32 MGV 10 carburetor. Later in the year came the Special, with complete instrumentation including oil-pressure gauge and tachometer, and the most powerful engine ever installed in this car: a 73 horsepower (54 kW) version of the 1,290 cc motor, with Weber 32/32 DMTR 90/250 carburetor and 4-2-1 exhaust.

A 3-door Mediteran model used either the base, 1,116 cc engine (55 horsepower) or the Special's 73 horsepower (54 kW) motor. It had round headlamps, like the earliest 101s. All 1979 Zastava 101s had a new steering wheel, with either Zastava or the company logo (101S/ 101SC) inscribed on the center horn button. In 1983, Zastava launched the 101 GT/GTL 55/65. New, wider chrome bumpers boasted integrated parking and indicator lights. A new radiator mask debuted, along with new side skirts and a new wheel design. The interior was redesigned, with a new dashboard, steering wheel, gear shifter and hand brake. The suspension was softer, and the car now sat lower, for better stability. The GTL model featured revisions to the brakes.

The standard, 1,116 cc motor produced 55 horsepower (41 kW) with a one-barrel IPM 32 MGV 12 carburetor, while the 1,301 cc engine made 65 horsepower (48 kW) with a two-barrel Weber 30/32 DMTR 90/250. A new cable connected the accelerator and carburetor.

In 1987, Zastava applied the YUGO name to the cars, in honor of their success in the United States. The pair was now called the YUGO 1.1 and 1.3 GX. A Y insignia was used instead of a Z. More interior colors debuted. All models used 4-2-1 exhaust systems. In 1988, the name was changed to YUGO Skala 55 and YUGO Skala 65. The butterfly-type front side windows were removed, while new plastic bumpers - much larger than those of old - debuted. The interiors were redesigned again, finished in grey or Sahara yellow. A Bosch ignition system was installed. The Skala 65 used a new two-barrel Weber 7Y2M-RA carburetor with an electronic choke atop its 1,301 cc engine, mated to a 5-speed gearbox.

These two models were produced until 1994, when their suspensions and gear-boxes were modified and their names were changed to Skala 55C and Skala 65C. For the 2008 model year, several revisions debuted (described above). The Zastava Skala 55 (101) remains something of a legend in Serbia: a solid, inexpensive car which can still be seen in all its generations, across ex-Yugoslavian territory and Eastern Europe.

== Gallery ==
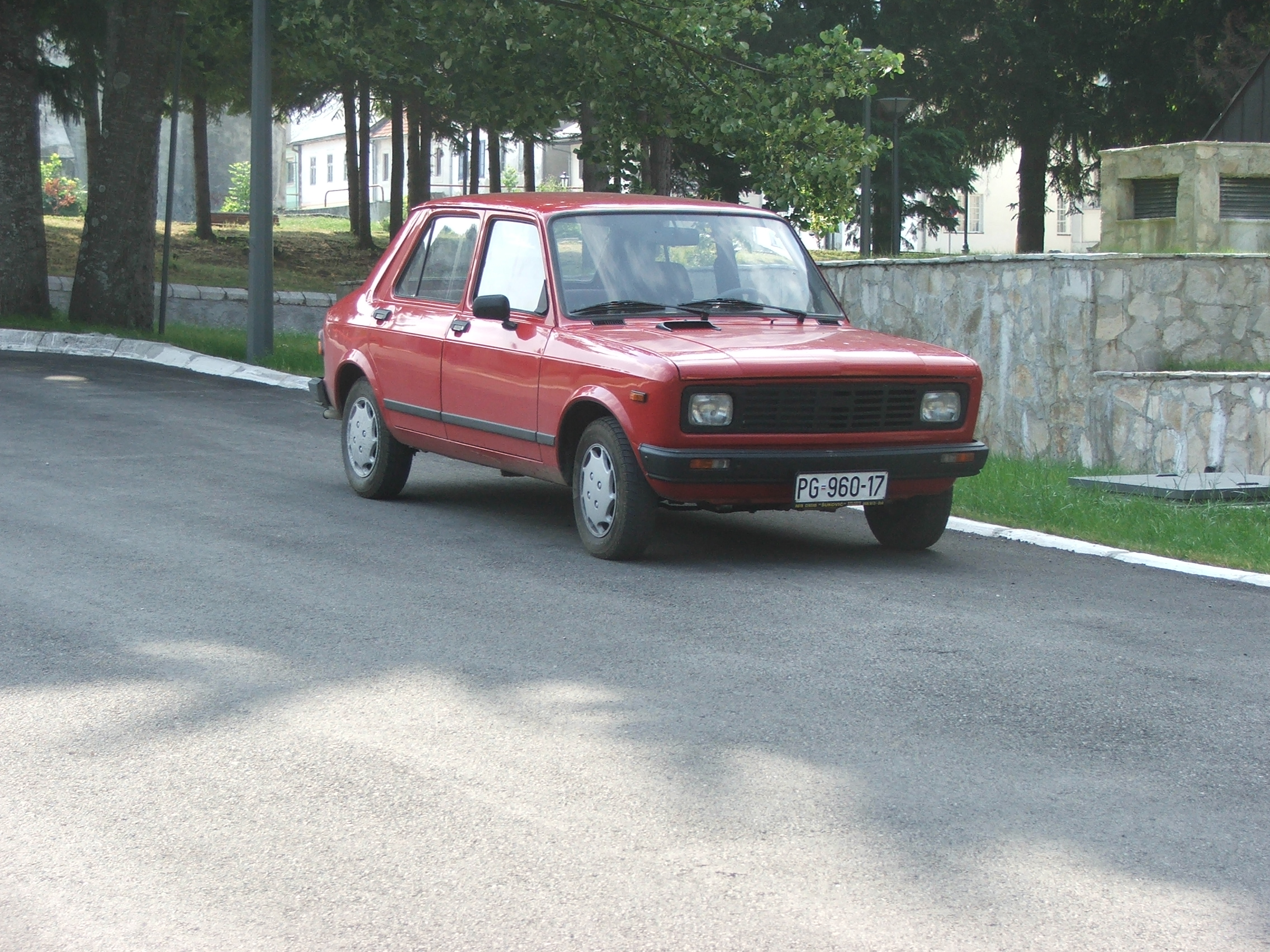
2006 Zastava Skala

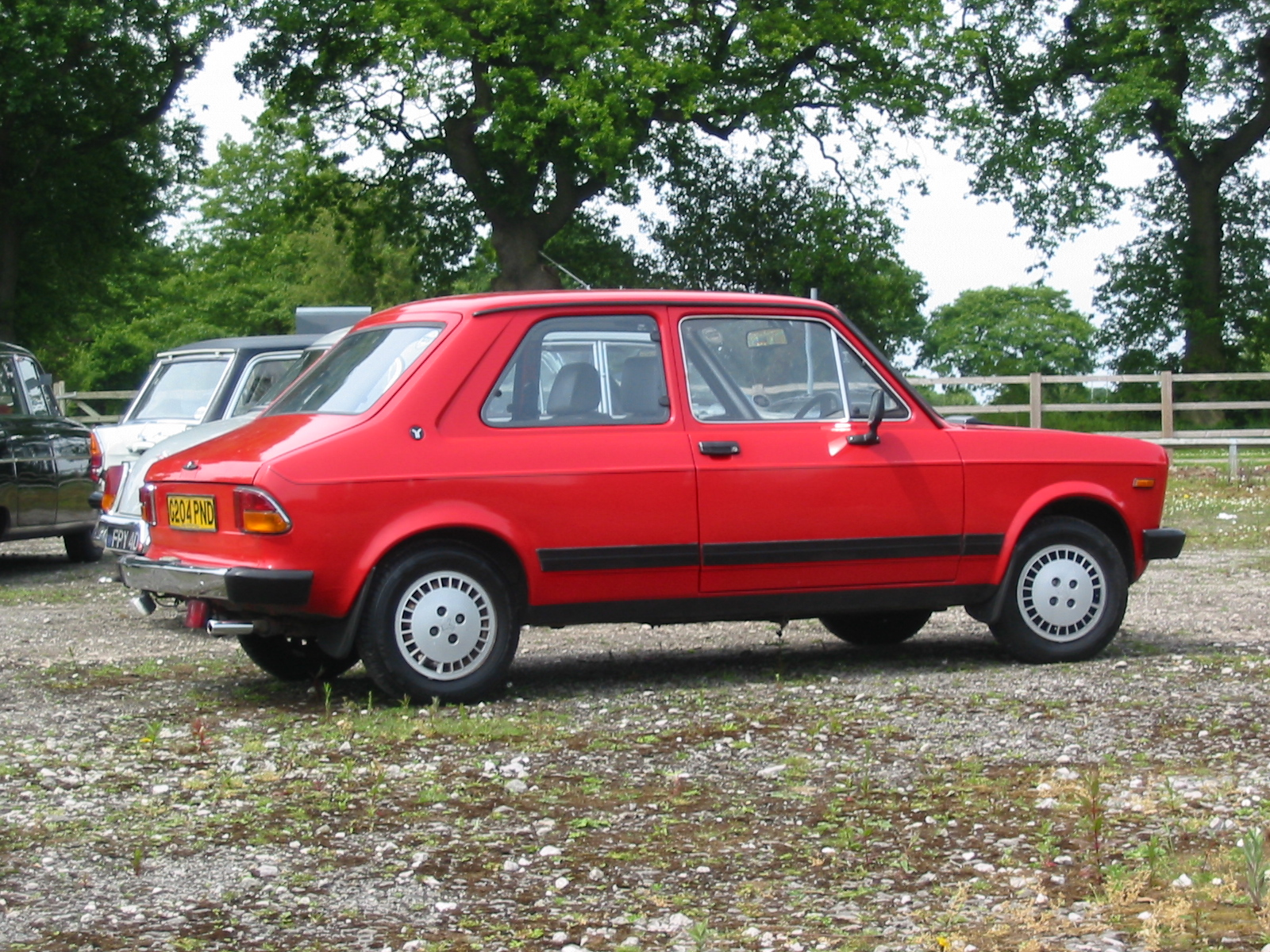
Zastava Yugo 311 (side view)

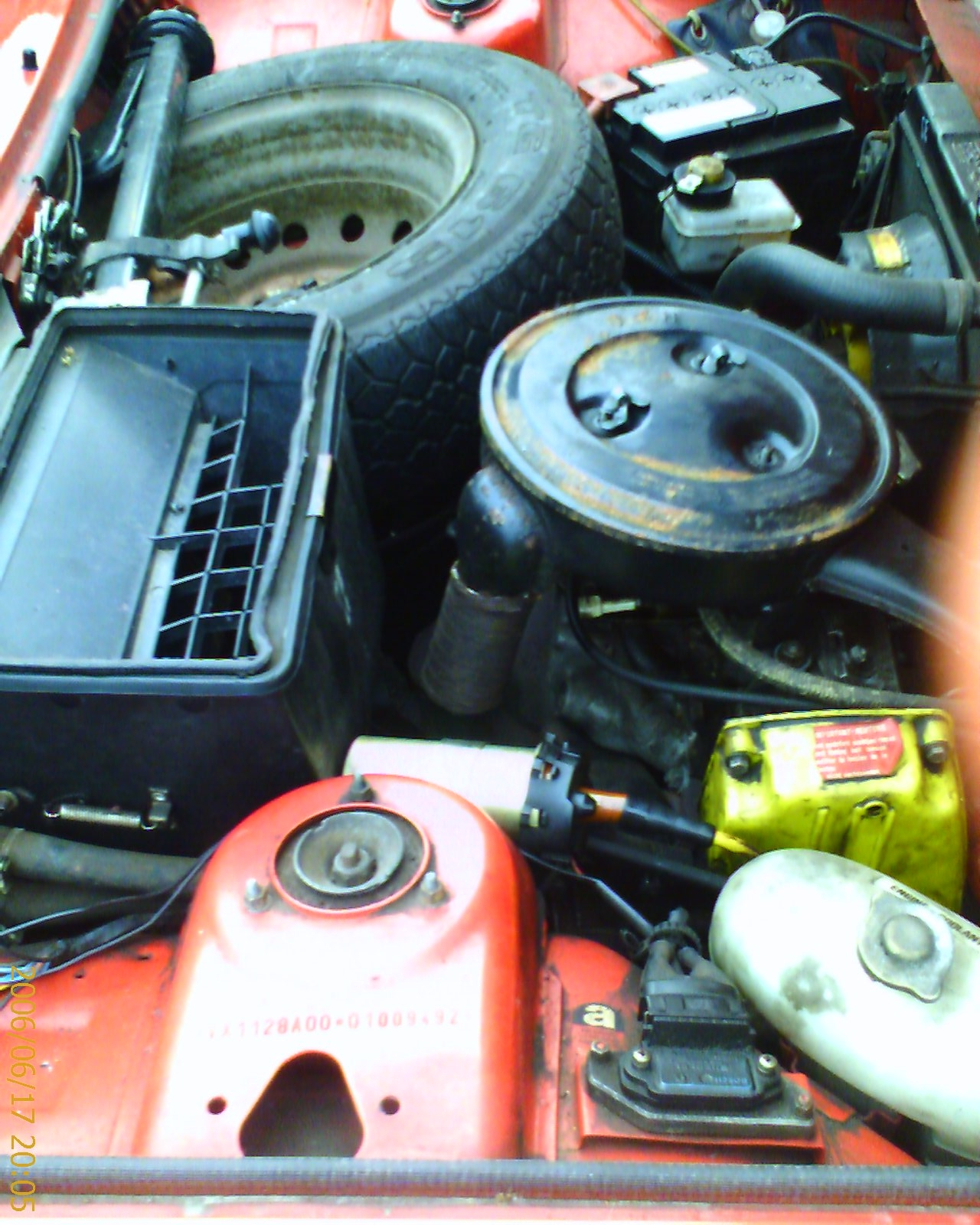
Zastava Yugo 311 (under bonnet)

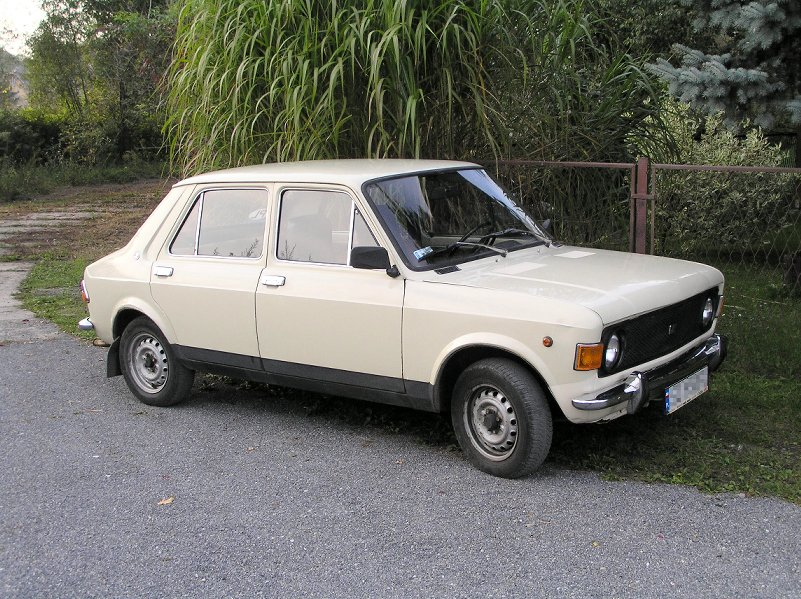
Zastava 1100p (built by FSO under license)

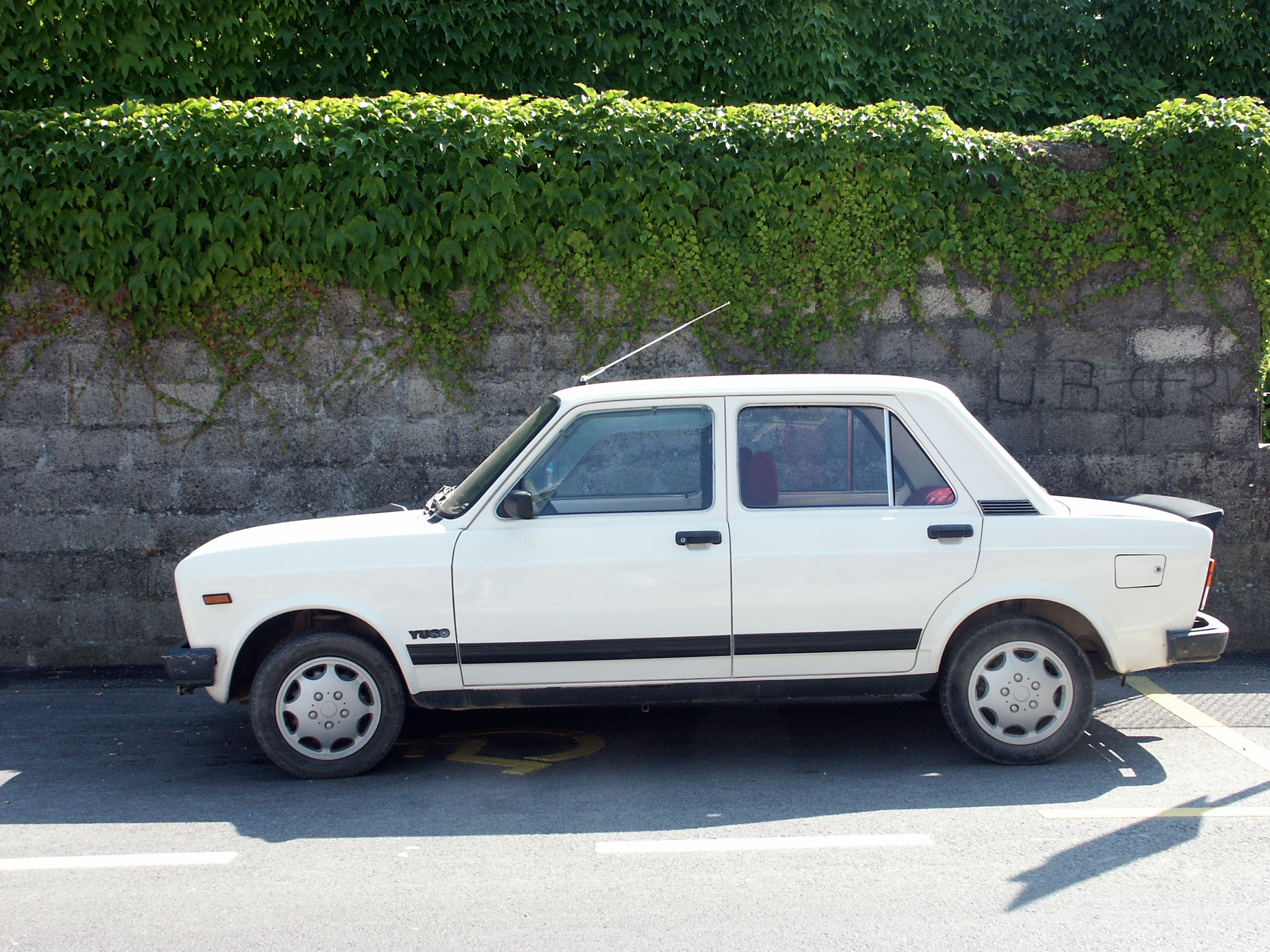
Zastava 128 Skala 55

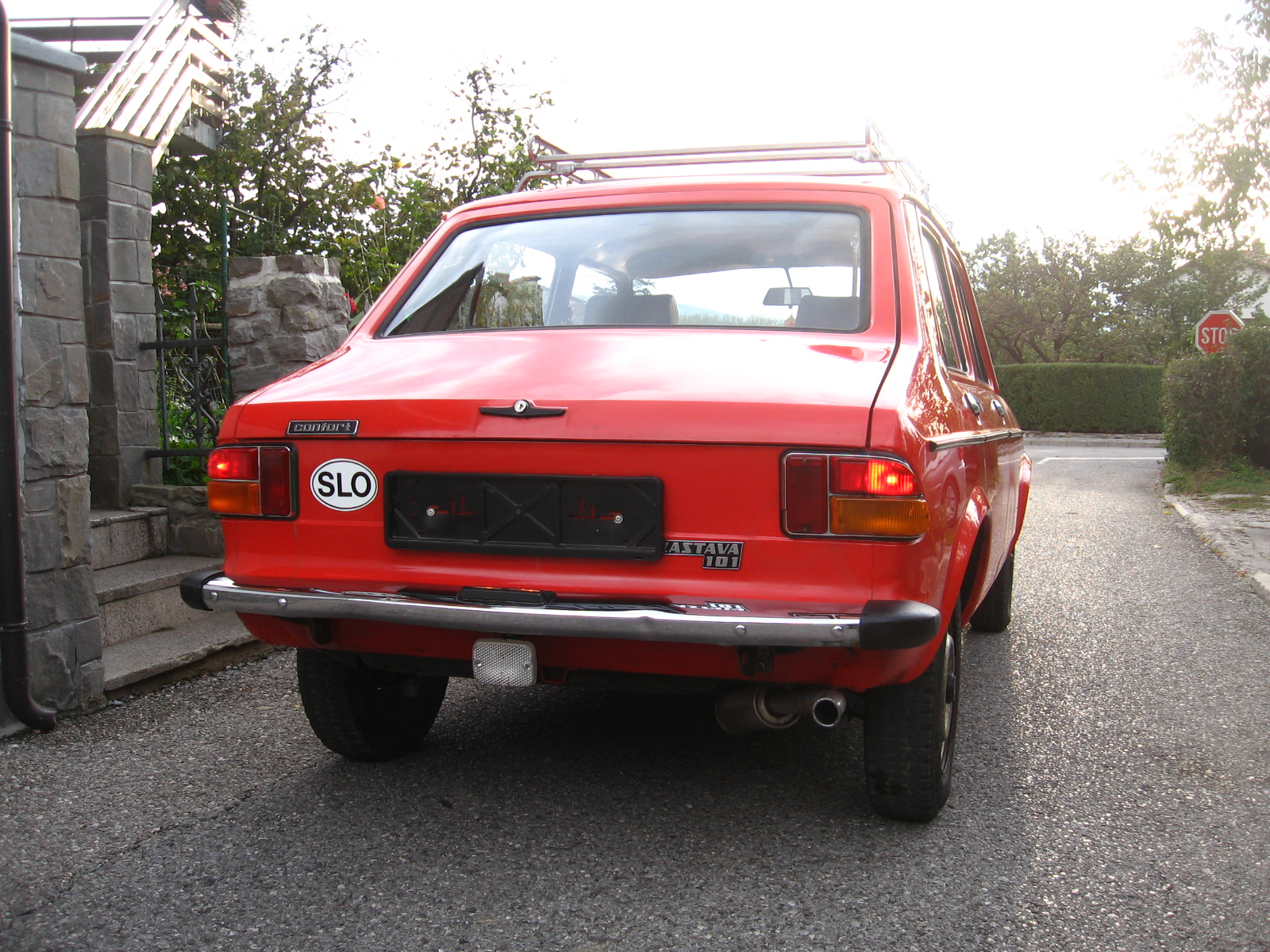
Zastava 101 Confort, 1982

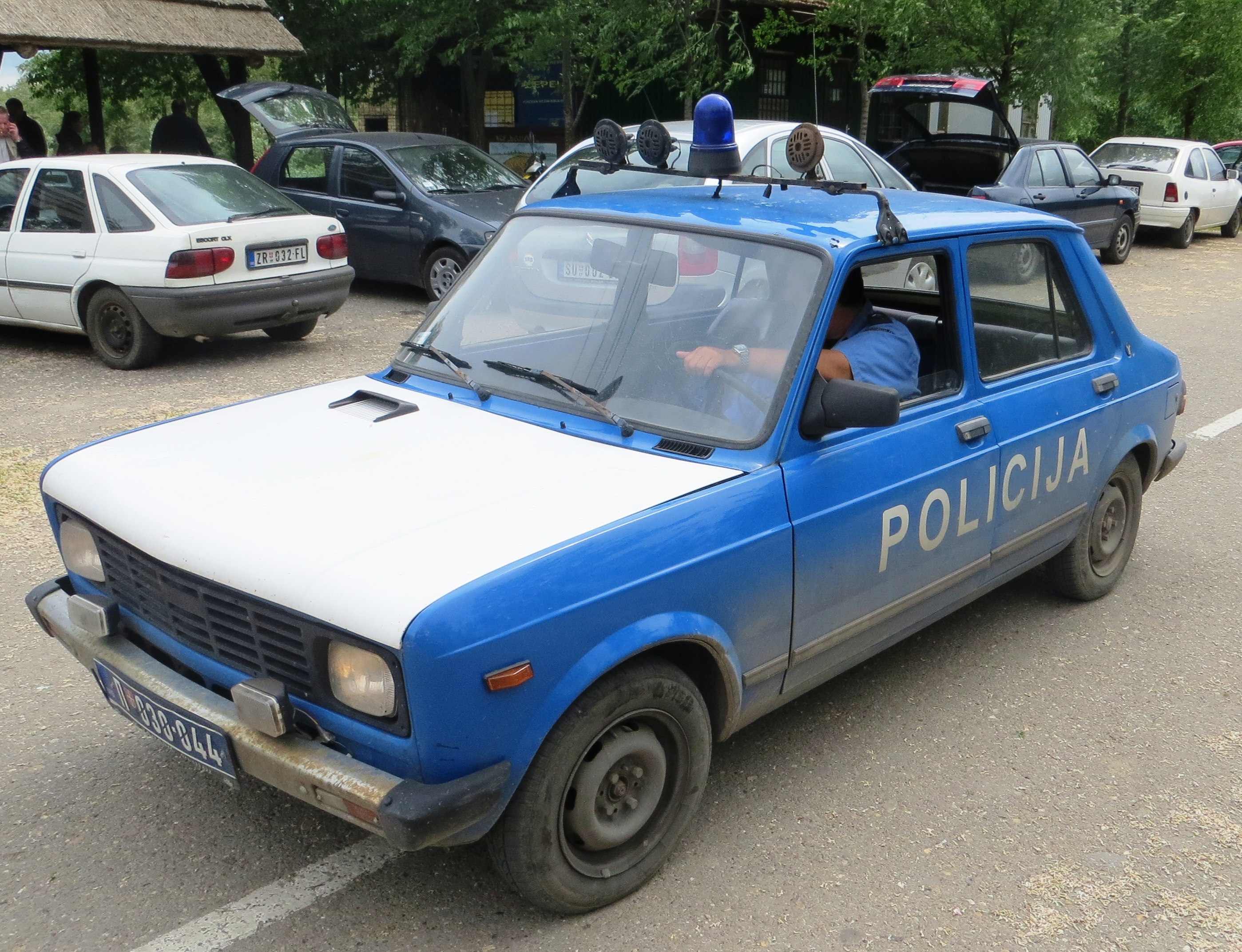
Serbian Police Zastava Yugo Skala 55C patrol car.
