= SAM (automotive) =

Self built vehicle

SAM (from Samochód Amatorski Motoru; Amateur Motor Car), in Polish law, is a kind of vehicle, usually car, motorcycle or tractor made by yourself or in a workshop. It is made in a single copy, less often in a small series. It is created by a thorough alteration of a serial vehicle or by building it from scratch. A vehicle brand "SAM" under the Act Polish: Prawo o ruchu drogowym, lit. 'Road Traffic Law' is a vehicle built using body, chassis or frame, own design. The construction uses many components of serial vehicles. The name derives from the popular in the 1950s in Poland by the competition of the weekly Motor called Auto Amatorski Motoru, in which the editors of the magazine presented handcrafted constructions by workers or craftsmen.

"SAM" tractors are used in agriculture and horticulture, most often without approval and registration - hence they are not allowed for road traffic on public roads.

Vehicle registration requires technical inspection.

The scope of tests allowing for admission to traffic is specified in the regulation by the Minister of Infrastructure of October 22, 2004 (Journal of Laws No. 238, item 2395) on tests of compliance of historic vehicles and "SAM" brand vehicles with technical conditions.

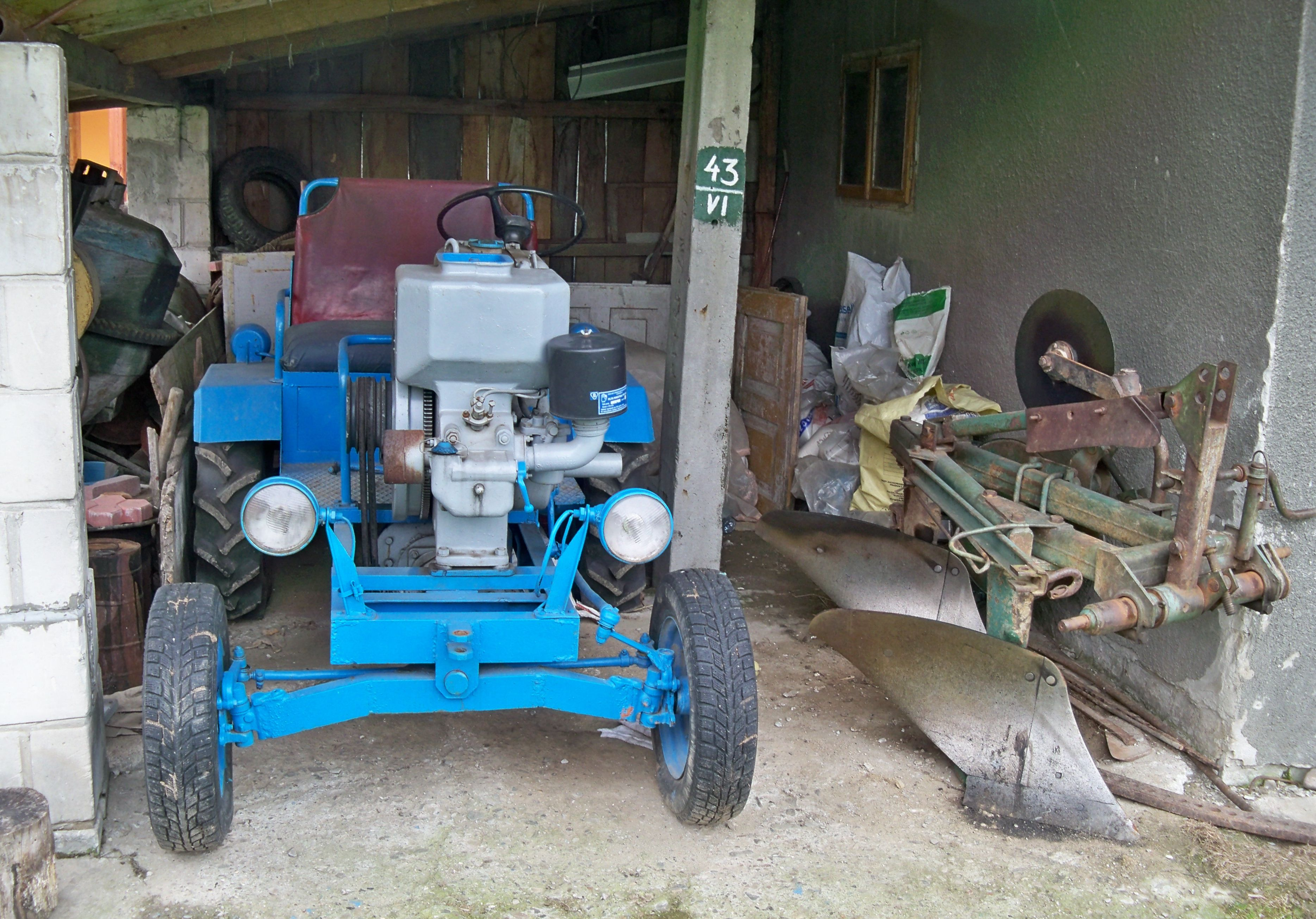

Reservations regarding registration:

- Self-built vehicle using Body, Chassis or frame of own design, brand of which is referred to as "SAM" without specifying model type
- Engine and you cannot build it yourself - documents for the complete engine assembly must be submitted for registration.
