= 2009 Bronze Helmet (Poland) =

The 2009 Silver Helmet (Polish: Turniej o Brązowy Kask, BK) is the 2009 version of Bronze Helmet organized by the Polish Motor Union (PZM). The Final took place on 11 September in Wrocław and was won by Maciej Janowski (Atlas Wrocław). Janowski beat Patryk Dudek (Falubaz Zielona Góra) and Łukasz Sówka (KM Lazur Ostrów Wlkp.).

== Semi-final ==
=== Bydgoszcz ===
- Semi-Final 1
- 20 August 2009
- Bydgoszcz
- Referee: Leszek Demski
- Change:

No. 9 Mateusz Łukowiak (ZIE) → Kamil Adamczewski (LES)
No. 14 Piotr Machnik (KRO) → (17) Marcin Bubel (CZE)
No. 16 Paweł Machnik (KRO) → (18) Adrian Osmólski (CZE)
No. 19 Edward Mazur (TAR) → None

Pos.	Rider	Points	Details
1	(6) Damian Sperz (GDA)	15	(3,3,3,3,3)
2	(11) Patryk Dudek (ZIE)	12	(3,3,M,3,3)
3	(1) Szymon Woźniak (BYD)	12	(3,3,2,2,2)
4	(7) Maciej Janowski (WRO)	10	(1,2,3,3,1)
5	(12) Sławomir Musielak (LES)	9	(2,2,3,M,2)
6	(13) Kamil Pulczyński (TOR)	8	(3,0,2,0,3)
7	(2) Damian Adamczak (BYD)	8	(1,2,1,2,2)
8	(15) Emil Pulczyński (TOR)	8	(2,2,2,1,1)
9	(4) Michał Curyło (BYD)	7+3	(2,3,1,1,M)
10	(9) Kamil Adamczewski (LES)	7+2	(0,0,2,2,3)
11	(5) Cyprian Szymko (GDA)	6	(2,1,0,1,2)
12	(8) Marcel Szymko (GDA)	5	(0,1,3,0,1)
13	(16) Adrian Osmólski (CZE)	5	(1,0,1,3,0)
14	(3) Kamil Cieślar (CZE)	4	(0,1,1,2,0)
15	(14) Marcin Bubel (CZE)	3	(0,1,0,1,1)
16	(9) Mateusz Łukaszewski (LES)	1	(1,R3,0,F3,M)

Heat 21: Adamczewski (Gate A), Curyło (B)

=== Poznań ===
- Semi-Final 2
- 20 August 2009
- Poznań
- Referee: Ryszard Bryła
- Best time: 66.82 - Przemysław Pawlicki in Heat 4
- Change:

No. 6 Mateusz Lampkowski (TOR) → Tomasz Wolniewicz (OPO)
No. 16 Piotr Szóstak (OST) → Łukasz Piecha (RYB)
No. 17 Tobiasz Musielak (LES) → None

Pos.	Rider	Points	Details
1	(14) Przemysław Pawlicki (LES)	15	(3,3,3,3,3)
2	(2) Dawid Lampart (RZE)	14	(3,2,3,3,3)
3	(9) Paweł Zmarzlik (GOR)	12	(3,3,2,2,2)
4	(10) Jakub Jamróg (TAR)	9	(0,1,3,3,2)
5	(15) Łukasz Sówka (OST)	9	(0,3,2,3,1)
6	(11) Łukasz Cyran (GOR)	9	(2,2,3,R4,2)
7	(4) Mateusz Chochliński (RYB)	9	(2,3,2,1,1)
8	(1) Kacper Gomólski (GNI)	9	(1,2,2,1,3)
9	(8) Mariusz Konsek (ŁÓD)	6+3	(1,2,1,2,0)
10	(3) Łukasz Kret (RZE)	6+2	(0,1,0,2,3)
11	(13) Patryk Kociemba (OST)	5	(2,1,1,1,X)
12	(16) Łukasz Piecha (RYB)	5	(1,1,1,1,1)
13	(12) Tadeusz Kostro (TAR)	4	(1,T,1,2,F)
14	(5) Kamil Fleger (RYB)	3	(3,Fx,0,F1x,N)
15	(6) Tomasz Wolniewicz (OPO)	2	(R4,R4,0,0,2)
16	(7) Rafał Klimek (LUB)	2	(2,R4,N,N,N)

== The Final ==
- 11 September 2009 (19:00 UTC+2)
- Wrocław
- Referee: Marek Smyła
- Best time: 65.6 - Patryk Dudek in Heat 3
- Change:

(5) injury Przemysław Pawlicki (LES) → Reserve 18

Placing	Rider	Total	1	2	3	4	5	6	7	8	9	10	11	12	13	14	15	16	17	18	19	20	Pts	Pos	21
1	(1) Maciej Janowski (WRO)	15	3				3				3				3				3				15	1	
2	(12) Patryk Dudek (ZIE)	13			3					2		3			2						3		13	2	3
3	(6) Łukasz Sówka (OST)	13		3				3			2							3			2		13	3	2
4	(4) Sławomir Musielak (LES)	12	2							3				3				1				3	12	4	
5	(10) Emil Pulczyński (TAR)	9			2			0						2			3		2				9	5	
6	(11) Paweł Zmarzlik (GOR)	8			0				3		1					3						1	8	6	
7	(14) Damian Sperz (GDA)	8				3		2					Fx		1							2	8	7	
8	(9) Dawid Lampart (RZE)	7			1		2						Fx					2		2			7	8	
9	(8) Łukasz Cyran (GOR)	6		2						1			F			2			1				6	9	
10	(16) Kamil Pulczyński (TOR)	5				2				R	0						F			3			5	10	
11	(13) Kacper Gomólski (GNI)	5				1	1							1		1					1		5	11	
12	(7) Damian Adamczak (BYD)	3		0					2					0	0					1			3	12	
13	(17) Mikołaj Curyło (BYD)	2										2	F				T	R			M		2	13	
14	(2) Jakub Jamróg (TAR)	2	1					1				Fx				N				N			2	14	
15	(5) Mariusz Konsek (ŁÓD)	1		1			0					F					Fx					M	1	15	
16	(3) Szymon Woźniak (BYD)	0	0						M				-				-				-		0	16	
17	(15) Mateusz Chochliński (RYB)	0				R3			X			-						-	-				0	17	
Placing	Rider	Total	1	2	3	4	5	6	7	8	9	10	11	12	13	14	15	16	17	18	19	20	Pts	Pos	21

m - exclusion for exceeding two minute time allowance • t - exclusion for touching the tapes • x - other exclusion • e - retired or mechanical failure • f - fell • ns - non-starter • nc - non-classify

gate A - inside	gate B	gate C	gate D - outside

== See also ==
- 2009 Individual Speedway Junior Polish Championship
