= 2008 Golden Helmet (Poland) =

2008 Polish speedway event

Seasons
- ← 2007 2009 →

The 48th Golden Helmet Polish: Turniej o Złoty Kask, ZK was the 2008 version of the Golden Helmet organized by the Polish Motor Union (PZM). It took place on October 25 in the Olympic Stadium in Wrocław, Poland. Defending Winner is Grzegorz Walasek from Zielona Góra.

Original date of Final was October 17, but after canceled of German Grand Prix and restarted Final Grand Prix on October 18, Main Comminsion for Speedway Sport decided aboute change date. After resignations top riders, Main Commission decided that top three riders are automatically qualify for 2010 Speedway Grand Prix Qualification without Domestic Qualifications.

The Golden Helmet was won by Damian Baliński from Unia Leszno, who beat Jarosław Hampel (Unia Leszno also) and Adrian Miedziński (Unibax Toruń). It was first time in history, when Baliński won in Golden Helmet; in 2005 he was second. Hampel was third in 2003, and Miedziński never won medal in this competition.

== Starting positions draw ==
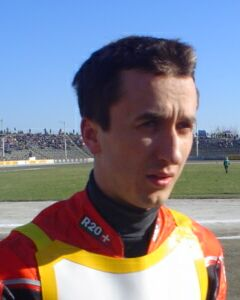
2007 Golden Helmet Winner Grzegorz Walasek.

Main Commission for Speedway Sport (Główna Komisja Sportu Żużlowego, GKSŻ) which is a part of the Polish Motor Union nominated 20 riders (12+3 track reserve from Ekstraliga and 4+1 from First League). Rafał Dobrucki, Tomasz Jędrzejak and Norbert Kościuch later replaced the injured Adrian Gomólski, Tomasz Gapiński and Krzysztof Buczkowski. After changed of Final date, Janusz Kołodziej must resigned, because on October 24 he was started in friendly match United States vs. Rest of the world. A few days before The Final, Tomasz Gollob, Rune Holta, Rafał Dobrucki and Robert Kościecha resigned. Next riders who resigned was Krzysztof Kasprzak, Krzysztof Jabłoński, Tomasz Chrzanowski, Sebastian Ułamek and Wiesław Jaguś, Mariusz Węgrzyk, Marcin Rempała, Maciej Kuciapa and Patryk Pawlaszczyk.

=== Original riders ===
1. ~~Krzysztof Kasprzak (Unia Leszno SSA)~~
2. ~~Adrian Gomólski (KM Ostrów)~~
3. ~~Tomasz Chrzanowski (Lotos Gdańsk)~~
4. Adrian Miedziński (Unibax Toruń)
5. ~~Tomasz Gapiński (CKM Złomrex Włókniarz Częstochowa)~~
6. ~~Sebastian Ułamek (CKM Złomrex Włókniarz Częstochowa)~~
7. Jarosław Hampel (Unia Leszno SSA)
8. ~~Tomasz Gollob (Caeleum Stal Gorzów)~~
9. Damian Baliński (Unia Leszno SSA)
10. Piotr Świderski (RKM Rybnik)
11. Grzegorz Walasek (ZKŻ Kronopol Zielona Góra)
12. ~~Robert Kościecha (Unibax Toruń)~~
13. ~~Rune Holta (Caeleum Stal Gorzów)~~
14. ~~Janusz Kołodziej (Unia Tarnów ŻSSA)~~
15. Adam Skórnicki (PSŻ Milion Team Poznań)
16. ~~Wiesław Jaguś (Unibax Toruń)~~
17. ~~Rafał Dobrucki (ZKŻ Kronopol Zielona Góra)~~
18. **Tomasz Jędrzejak** (ATLAS Wrocław)
19. ~~Piotr Protasiewicz (ZKŻ Kronopol Zielona Góra)~~
20. ~~Krzysztof Buczkowski (Polonia Bydgoszcz)~~

Note: riders in bold type is Wrocław' rider.

=== Final participants ===
1. Sławomir Drabik (Unia Tarnów ŻSSA)
2. Piotr Protasiewicz (ZKŻ Kronopol Zielona Góra)
3. None
4. Adrian Miedziński (Unibax Toruń)
5. **Tomasz Jędrzejak** (Atlas Wrocław)
6. Roman Povazhny (Marma Polskie Folie Rzeszów)
7. Jarosław Hampel (Unia Leszno SSA)
8. Norbert Kościuch (PSŻ Poznań)
9. Damian Baliński (Unia Leszno SSA)
10. Piotr Świderski (RKM Rybnik)
11. Grzegorz Walasek (ZKŻ Kronopol Zielona Góra)
12. **Daniel Jeleniewski** (Atlas Wrocław)
13. Grzegorz Zengota (ZKŻ Kronopol Zielona Góra)
14. Rafał Trojanowski (PSŻ Milion Team Poznań)
15. Adam Skórnicki (PSŻ Milion Team Poznań)
16. Jacek Rempała (Unia Tarnów ŻSSA)
17. Patryk Pawlaszczyk (RKM Rybnik)

== Heat details ==
- 2008-10-25, 19:00 CEST
- Referee: Wojciech Grodzki

Placing	Rider	Total	1	2	3	4	5	6	7	8	9	10	11	12	13	14	15	16	17	18	19	20	Pts	Pos
1	(9) Damian Baliński (LES)	14			3		3						3					3		2			14	1
2	(7) Jarosław Hampel (LES)	13		3					2					2	3					3			13	2
3	(4) Adrian Miedziński (TOR)	11	3							3				3				1				1	11	3
4	(10) Piotr Świderski (RYB)	9			2			2						1			3		1				9	4
5	(6) Roman Povazhny (RZE)	8		0				0			3							2			3		8	5
6	(15) Adam Skórnicki (POZ)	8				3			3			2						0	0				8	6
7	(5) Tomasz Jędrzejak (WRO)	8		1			2					0					2					3	8	7
8	(12) Daniel Jeleniewski (WRO)	8			E1					1		3			2						2		8	8
9	(8) Norbert Kościuch (POZ)	8		2						2			2			0			2				8	9
10	(11) Grzegorz Walasek (ZIE)	8			1				1		2					2						2	8	10
11	(2) Piotr Protasiewicz (ZIE)	7	1					3				1				1				1			7	11
12	(13) Grzegorz Zengota (ZIE)	6				1	1							0		3					1		6	12
13	(1) Sławomir Drabik (TAR)	5	2				0				0				0				3				5	13
14	(16) Jacek Rempała (TAR)	3				2				0	1						0			0			3	14
15	(14) Rafał Trojanowski (POZ)	3				0		1					1		1							0	3	15
Placing	Rider	Total	1	2	3	4	5	6	7	8	9	10	11	12	13	14	15	16	17	18	19	20	Pts	Pos

m - exclusion for exceeding two minute time allowance • t - exclusion for touching the tapes • x - other exclusion • e - retired or mechanical failure • f - fell • ns - non-starter • nc - non-classify

gate A - inside	gate B	gate C	gate D - outside

=== Heat after heat ===
1. Miedziński, Drabik, Protasiewicz
2. Hampel, Kościuch, Jędrzejak, Povazhny
3. Baliński, Świderski, Walasek, Jeleniewski (d1)
4. Skórnicki, Rempała, Zengota, Trojanowski
5. Baliński, Jędrzejak, Zengota, Drabik
6. Protasiewicz, Świderski, Trojanowski, Povazhny
7. Skórnicki, Hampel, Walasek
8. Miedziński, Kościuch, Jeleniewski, Rempała
9. Povazhny, Walasek, Rempała, Drabik
10. Jeleniewski, Skórnicki, Protasiewicz, Jędrzejak
11. Baliński, Kościuch, Trojanowski
12. Miedziński, Hampel, Świderski, Zengota
13. Hampel, Jeleniewski, Trojanowski, Drabik
14. Zengota, Walasek, Protasiewicz, Kościuch
15. Świderski, Jędrzejak, Rempała
16. Baliński, Povazhny, Miedziński, Skórnicki
17. Drabik, Kościuch, Świderski, Skórnicki
18. Hampel, Baliński, Protasiewicz, Rempała
19. Povazhny, Jeleniewski, Zengota
20. Jędrzejak, Walasek, Miedziński, Trojanowski

== See also ==
- Speedway in Poland
