= 1948 Polish speedway season =

Motorcycle racing competition

The 1948 Polish Speedway season was the 1948 season of motorcycle speedway in Poland.

== Individual ==
=== Polish Individual Speedway Championship ===
The individual event was cancelled.

Start list Kraków, October 24

- First league
  - Jan Wąsikowski – PKM Warszawa (35)
  - Józef Olejniczak – LKM Leszno (32)
  - Jan Najdrowski – Olimpia Grudziądz (31)
  - Jerzy Dąbrowski – PKM Warszawa (30)
  - Alfred Smoczyk – LKM Leszno (29)
  - Jan Krakowiak – DKS Łódź (28)
  - Tadeusz Zwoliński – Olimpia Grudziądz (26)
  - Marian Rejek – KM Ostrów Wlkp. (26)
  - Tadeusz Kołeczek – Tramwajarz Łódź (25)
  - Stefan Maciejewski – KM Ostrów Wlkp. (24)
  - Czesław Szałkowski – Olimpia Grudziądz (24)
  - Władysław Kamrowski – GKM Gdańsk (21)
- Second league
  - Jerzy Jankowski – Polonia Bytom (35)
  - Jan Filipczak – Legia Warszawa (26)
  - Bogusław Osowiecki – Legia Warszawa (25)
  - Jan Paluch – Polonia Bytom (24)

Points in League events

== Team ==
=== Team Speedway Polish Championship ===
The 1948 Team Speedway Polish Championship season was the first season of the contest used to determine the Polish team champions. PKM Warszawa were crowned the first winners of the competition.

Rules

Composition First and Second Leagues were established after qualifications with three rounds. Every team consisted of three riders, but only one were exposed to every round. Every event consisted of 20 races. Score was 4–3–2–1 and 0 it no-completion heat. Engine capacity was not considered.

First, Second and Third League included 9 teams. Matches were played with part three teams. Terms were made up of six drivers plus reserve. Game consisted with 9 races. In one day were played 3 three-cornered matches. For winning match team received 3 points, for second place 2 points and for third 1 point. The drivers with the main squad of a team started in the match three times. The quantity of small points was added up.

==== First and Second Leagues ====
Qualification

Pos	Team	Points
1	PKM Warszawa	55
2	Motoklub Rawicz	48
3	LKM Leszno	47
4	GKM Gdańsk	43
5	Olimpia Grudziądz	41
6	Tramwajarz Łódź	40
7	DKS Łódź	39
8	KM Ostrów Wlkp.	39
9	OM TUR Okęcie Warszawa	38
10	SSM Gdynia	37
11	RKM Budowlani Rybnik	35
12	Legia Warszawa	31
13	Unia Poznań	23
14	CTCiM Częstochowa	22
15	Polonia Bydgoszcz	18
16	Pogoń Katowice	9
res.	Polonia Bytom	-
res.	Lechia Poznań	-

==== First League ====
Pos	Team	Match	Match Pts	Heats Pts
1	PKM Warszawa	4	11	90
2	LKM Leszno	4	11	82
3	Olimpia Grudziądz	4	10	82
4	KM Ostrów Wlkp.	4	8.5	69
5	Motoklub Rawicz	4	7.5	65
6	OM Tur Okęcie Warszawa	4	6	50
7	Tramwajarz Łódź	4	6	50
8	GKM Gdańsk	4	6	52
9	DKS Łódź	4	6	59

==== Second League ====
Pos	Team	Match	Match Pts	Heats Pts
1	Polonia Bytom	4	11	83
2	RKM Budowlani Rybnik	4	11	76
3	Polonia Bydgoszcz	4	10	89
4	Pogoń Katowice	4	8	59
5	Legia Warszawa	4	7	65
6	Lechia Poznań	4	7	62
7	CTCiM Częstochowa	4	6	58
8	SSM Gdynia	4	6	54
9	Unia Poznań	4	5	41

Medalists

PKM Warszawa	Jan Wąsikowski, Jerzy Dąbrowski, Stanisław Brun, Mieczysław Chlebicz
LKM Leszno	Józef Olejniczak, Antoni Osiecki, Stanisław Przybylski, Alfred Smoczyk, Jan Tomkowiak
Olimpia Grudziądz	Jan Najdrowski, Władysław Gątkiewicz, Tadeusz Zwoliński, Jan Matczak, Czesław Szałkowski, B.Nowakowski, Zbigniew Sander, Stanisław Stęplowski

==== Third League (Local) ====
Only teams from Greater Poland (Poznań district) participated in Poznań District League. (Poznańska Liga Okręgowa). ZZK Poznań played only in first round and was replaced by Unia Zielona Góra.

Pos	Team	Match	Match Pts	Heats Pts
1	Motoklub Rawicz II	4	12	95
2	LKM Leszno II	4	11	89
3	Unia Chodzież	4	9	71
4	Unia Gniezno	4	9	?
5	Unia Gostyń	4	8	?
6	Unia Gorzów Wlkp.	4	6.5	?
7	Unia Zielona Góra	3	5.5	50
8	ŚKS Śrem	4	5	?
9	HCP Poznań	4	5	41
10	ZZK Poznań	1	4	?

Race-Off
Pos	Team	Points
1	Motoklub Rawicz II	24
2	Unia Chodzież	14
3	Unia Gniezno	?
