= 2010 Silver Helmet (Poland) =

The 2010 Silver Helmet (Polish: Turniej o Srebrny Kask, SK) is the 2010 version of Silver Helmet organized by the Polish Motor Union (PZM). The Final took place on 12 August in Bydgoszcz.

== Semi-final ==
=== Gdańsk ===
- (Poland) Gdańsk
- 2 July 2010
- Referee: Andrzej Terlecki (Gdynia)
- Beat Time: 62.93 - Artur Mroczka in Heat 2
- Attendance: 200
- Change:

Draw 14. injured Kamil Pulczyński (TOR) → Reserve 17
Draw 18. injured Damian Adamczak (BYD)

Pos.	Rider	Points	Details
1	(8) Artur Mroczka (GRU)	15	(3,3,3,3,3)
2	(16) Emil Pulczyński (TOR)	12	(3,2,3,3,1)
3	(4) Adrian Szewczykowski (POZ)	12	(3,1,3,3,2)
4	(2) Damian Celmer (POZ)	12	(2,3,3,1,3)
5	(11) Patryk Dudek (ZIE)	11	(2,3,1,2,3)
6	(3) Marcel Szymko (GDA)	9	(1,2,2,1,3)
7	(1) Damian Sperz (GDA)	8	(0,1,2,3,2)
8	(10) Szymon Woźniak (BYD)	8	(3,2,2,0,1)
9	(5) Bartosz Szymura (KRA)	7+R	(2,R,2,2,1)
10	(13) Rafał Fleger (RYB)	7+X	(2,2,1,0,2)
11	(9) Łukasz Sówka (ZIE)	4	(1,3,0,F,0)
12	(14) Mateusz Lampkowski (GDA)	4	(X,1,1,2,0)
13	(6) Cyprian Szymko (PIŁ)	3	(1,Fx,0,2,0)
14	(12) Mikołaj Curyło (BYD)	3	(F4,0,1,1,1)
15	(15) Kamil Fleger (RYB)	2	(1,1,Fx,-,-)
16	(7) Jakub Jamróg (TAR)	2	(T/-,0,0,0,2)
17	(19) Mateusz Łukaszewski (LES)	1	(0,1,0)

=== Krosno ===
- (Poland) Krosno
- 2 July 2010
- Referee: Jerzy Najwer
- Beat Time: 71.0 - Paweł Zmarzlik in Heat 3
- Attendance: 350
- Changes:

Draw 2. Dawid Lampart (RZE) → Reserve 17
Draw 6. Borys Miturski (CZE) → Reserve 19
Draw 8. Kacper Gomólski (GNI) → Szymon Kiełbasa
Draw 13. Tobiasz Musielak (RAW) → Reserve 18

Pos.	Rider	Points	Details
1	(11) Paweł Zmarzlik (GOR)	14	(3,3,3,2,3)
2	(10) Maciej Janowski (WRO)	14	(2,3,3,3,3)
3	(12) Przemysław Pawlicki (GOR)	13	(1,3,3,3,3)
4	(8) Szymon Kiełbasa (TAR)	13	(3,2,3,3,2)
5	(9) Łukasz Cyran (GOR)	11	(0,3,2,3,3)
6	(15) Sławomir Musielak (LES)	10	(3,2,2,2,1)
7	(3) Marcel Kajzer (OST)	8	(3,1,0,2,2)
8	(6) Mateusz Domański (RYB)	6+3	(1,2,2,1,Fx)
9	(16) Sławomir Pyszny (RYB)	6+2	(2,1,1,1,1)
10	(4) Marcin Piekarski (OPO)	5	(1,0,2,0,2)
11	(7) Mateusz Kowalczyk (ŁÓD)	5	(0,0,1,2,2)
12	(14) Marcin Bubel (CZE)	4	(1,0,1,1,1)
13	(13) Tadeusz Kostro (LUB)	4	(0,2,0,1,1)
14	(5) Oskar Fajfer (GNI)	3	(2,1,1,0,F)
15	(1) Mateusz Szostek (KRO)	2	(2,0,0,0,-)
16	(2) Karol Sroka (OST)	1	(0,1,0,R,R)
17	() Mateusz Wieczorek (KRO)	0	(R)

== The Final ==
- (Poland) Bydgoszcz
- 12 August 2009
- Referee:

Placing	Rider	Total	1	2	3	4	5	6	7	8	9	10	11	12	13	14	15	16	17	18	19	20	Pts	Pos
	(1) Damian Celmer (POZ)	0																					0	
	(2) Szymon Kiełbasa (TAR)	0																					0	
	(3) Adrian Szewczykowski (POZ)	0																					0	
	(4) Patryk Dudek (ZIE)	0																					0	
	(5) Paweł Zmarzlik (GOR)	0																					0	
	(6) Łukasz Cyran (GOR)	0																					0	
	(7) Damian Sperz (GDA)	0																					0	
	(8) Sławomir Musielak (LES)	0																					0	
	(9) Maciej Janowski (WRO)	0																					0	
	(10) Marcel Szymko (GDA)	0																					0	
	(11) Przemysław Pawlicki (GOR)	0																					0	
	(12) Emil Pulczyński (TOR)	0																					0	
	(13) Mateusz Domański (RYB)	0																					0	
	(14) Artur Mroczka (GRU)	0																					0	
	(15) Marcel Kajzer (OST)	0																					0	
	(16) Szymon Woźniak (BYD)	0																					0	
	(17) Bartosz Szymura (KRA)	0																					0	
	(18) Sławomir Pyszny (RYB)	0																					0	
Placing	Rider	Total	1	2	3	4	5	6	7	8	9	10	11	12	13	14	15	16	17	18	19	20	Pts	Pos

m - exclusion for exceeding two minute time allowance • t - exclusion for touching the tapes • x - other exclusion • e - retired or mechanical failure • f - fell • ns - non-starter • nc - non-classify

gate A - inside	gate B	gate C	gate D - outside

== See also ==
- 2010 Individual Speedway Junior Polish Championship
