= 2010 Polish Domestic Qualifications to World and European Speedway Championships =

The Polish Motor Union (PZM) determined Polish riders to World and European Championships in several domestic qualifications meetings.

== European Championship ==
Main Commission of Speedway Sport nominated eight riders to championships:

- Qualifying Round One - Mureck
  - (Draw 6) Rafał Trojanowski
  - (13) Robert Miśkowiak
- Qualifying Round Two - Diedenbergen
  - (4) Adrian Gomólski
  - (13) Michał Szczepaniak
- Semi-Final One - Ljubljana
  - (5) Szymon Kiełbasa
  - (16) Sebastian Ułamek
- Semi-Final Two - Balakovo
  - (10) Dawid Stachyra
- Semi-Final Three - Berghaupten
  - (3) Sławomir Musielak

== Under-19 European Championship ==
- 3 May 2010
- Rawicz, Greater Poland Voivodeship
- Florian Kapała Stadium (Length: 330 m)
- Referee: Leszek Dembski
- Beat Time: 61.37 - Patryk Dudek in Heat 7
- Attendance: 50

Przemysław Pawlicki is a defending Under-19 European Champion. Maciej Janowski (draw 7) after crashed on 1 May in Ekstraliga match (Wrocław vs. Leszno) decided about resigned from this competitions. and was replaced by Łukasz Cyran. Janowski was second in 2009 championship. Patryk Dudek was started in last year European final also (was fifth), and Kacper Gomólski was track reserve.

Pos.	Rider	Points	Details
1	(11) Patryk Dudek ZIE	14	(3,3,3,3,2)
2	(7) Łukasz Cyran GOR	14	(3,2,3,3,3)
3	(3) Przemysław Pawlicki GOR	13	(3,1,3,3,3)
4	(12) Emil Pulczyński TOR	10	(1,3,3,1,2)
5	(14) Kacper Gomólski GNI	9	(1,3,2,0,3)
6	(1) Tobiasz Musielak RAW	9	(T/-,3,1,2,3)
7	(13) Marcel Szymko GDA	8+3	(3,2,2,0,1)
8	(2) Mateusz Łukaszewski LES	8+2	(2,1,2,1,2)
9	(15) Kamil Cieślar CZE	7	(2,0,R,3,2)
10	(4) Marcin Bubel CZE	7	(1,2,1,2,1)
11	(6) Damian Adamczak BYD	6	(2,2,2,F,0)
12	(18) Mikołaj Curyło BYD	5	(1,1,2,1)
13	(10) Kamil Pulczyński TOR	4	(2,F,F,2,Z)
14	(16) Jakub Jamróg TAR	3	(0,1,0,1,1)
15	(9) Łukasz Sówka ZIE	1	(F,0,0,1,0)
16	(17) Kamil Adamczewski LES	1	(X,X,1,F,0)
17	(5) Patryk Kociemba WRO	0	(F/N,-,-,-,-)
18	(8) Szymon Woźniak BYD	0	(F/N,-,-,-,-)

Kociemba crashed Woźniak in Heat 2. Kociemba was replaced by reserve 18, and Woźniak was replaced by reserve 17. Reserve 17 was ride in Heat 1 also, replaced rider 1.

== See also ==
- 2010 in sports
- Speedway in Poland
