= 2009 Golden Helmet (Poland) =

Seasons
- ← 2008 2010 →

The 2009 Golden Helmet (Polish: Turniej o Złoty Kask, ZK) is the 2009 version of Golden Helmet organized by the Polish Motor Union (PZM). The Finals took place on 30 April 2010 in Zielona Góra. The Golden Helmet was won by Janusz Kołodziej who beat Piotr Protasiewicz and Krzysztof Kasprzak. It was his second win (after 2005 season). Kołodziej was also the 2010 Golden Helmet host on September.

Like in 2008 Final, top three riders automatically qualified for 2011 Speedway Grand Prix Qualification in 2010 season without Domestic Qualifications. Because Kołodziej (1st) and Grzegorz Zengota (4th) won the qualify in the Domestic Final, Adrian Miedziński (5th) qualified also. Because all top five riders get the quality, Kasprzak (3rd) and Miedziński (5th) did not ride in the Run-Off heats and lost the chance for the highest place.

== Date controversy ==
Original date of Finals was October 10, 2009, but one day later in Zielona Góra was expected Speedway Ekstraliga Final. Main Commission of Speedway Sport (GKSŻ) decided about change date to October 2.

However, the meeting was cancelled because the track was deemed unsafe (after the rain) by the Referee and was delayed to October 14. After that, GKSŻ, moved the Finals date to October 15. On this day, meeting was cancelled again, because the track was deemed unsafe (after the rain again). Because, the Ekstraliga Final at Zielona Góra, was delayed four times, the GKSŻ decided about hosting the Golden Helmet Final in 2010 season.

In 2010 season, original date was March 27, but was moved to April 17, because the Zielona Góra stadium was remounted. But three days before the Final, GKSŻ decide about not hosting 2009 edition. One week later, GKSŻ change a decision and expected the Final' day to April 30.

== Start list ==
Original starting position draw

1. Krzysztof Kasprzak (Unia Leszno SSA)
2. Krzysztof Jabłoński (TŻ Start Gniezno)
3. Tomasz Gollob (Stal Gorzów SA)
4. Wiesław Jaguś (KST Unibax SA Toruń)
5. Tomasz Gapiński (CKM Włókniarz SA Częstochowa)
6. Grzegorz Walasek (ZKŻ SSA Zielona Góra)
7. Jarosław Hampel (Unia Leszno SSA)
8. Piotr Świst (KS Speedway Polonia Piła)
9. Rune Holta (Stal Gorzów SA)
10. Piotr Protasiewicz (ZKŻ SSA Zielona Góra)
11. Sebastian Ułamek (Unia Tarnów ŻSSA)
12. Stanisław Burza (KŻ Orzeł Łódź)
13. Janusz Kołodziej (Unia Tarnów ŻSSA)
14. Rafał Dobrucki (ZKŻ SSA Zielona Góra)
15. Piotr Świderski (Unia Tarnów ŻSSA)
16. Adrian Miedziński (KST Unibax SA Toruń)
17. Daniel Jeleniewski (WTS SA Wrocław)
18. Tomasz Jędrzejak (WTS SA Wrocław)
19. Ronnie Jamroży (RKM Rybnik)
20. Jacek Rempała (SKMŻ Lublin)

Changes:

Draw 3. Tomasz Gollob → Tomasz Gapiński
Draw 5. Tomasz Gapiński → Grzegorz Zengota
Draw 6. Grzegorz Walasek → Tomasz Jędrzejak
Draw 15. Piotr Świderski → Ronnie Jamroży

Emply:

Draw 9. Rune Holta
Draw 12. Stanisław Burza

== Results ==
- 30 April 2010
- Zielona Góra
- Referee: Leszek Demski (Ostrów Wlkp.)

Placing	Rider	Total	1	2	3	4	5	6	7	8	9	10	11	12	13	14	15	16	17	18	19	20	Pts	Pos
1	(13) Janusz Kołodziej (LES)	15				3	3							3		3					3		15	1
2	(10) Piotr Protasiewicz (ZIE)	11			3			3						1			1		3				11	2
3	(1) Krzysztof Kasprzak (TAR)	11	3				2				2				2				2				11	3
4	(5) Grzegorz Zengota (ZIE)	10		3			1					3					0					3	10	4
5	(16) Adrian Miedziński (TOR)	10				0				2	3						3			2			10	5
6	(7) Jarosław Hampel (LES)	9		1					2					0	3					3			9	6
7	(14) Rafał Dobrucki (ZIE)	9				1		2					3		1							2	9	7
8	(11) Sebastian Ułamek (TAR)	9			2				3		1					2						1	9	8
9	(4) Wiesław Jaguś (TOR)	8	0							3				2				3				0	8	9
10	(3) Tomasz Gapiński (GOR)	7	1						1				1				2				2		7	10
11	(15) Ronnie Jamroży (RYB)	6				2			0			2						2	0				6	11
12	(2) Krzysztof Jabłoński (GNI)	6	2					1				1				1				1			6	12
13	(8) Piotr Świst (PIŁ)	4		0						1			2			0			1				4	13
14	(6) Tomasz Jędrzejak (TAR)	3		2				0			0							1			X		3	14
	(9) Emply	0																					0	
	(12) Emply	0																					0	
Placing	Rider	Total	1	2	3	4	5	6	7	8	9	10	11	12	13	14	15	16	17	18	19	20	Pts	Pos

m - exclusion for exceeding two minute time allowance • t - exclusion for touching the tapes • x - other exclusion • e - retired or mechanical failure • f - fell • ns - non-starter • nc - non-classify

gate A - inside	gate B	gate C	gate D - outside

== See also ==
- 2009 Individual Speedway Polish Championship
