= Marcin Nowak (speedway rider) =

Polish speedway rider

- Born: 18 August 1995 (age 31); Leszno, Poland
- Nationality: Polish

Career history

Poland
- 2011, 2013: Leszno
- 2012, 2013: Ostrów
- 2013, 2016: Kraków
- 2014–2016: Grudziądz
- 2017–2018: Gniezno
- 2019: Poznań
- 2020–2022: Łódź
- 2023–2025: Rzeszów

Sweden
- 2018-2019: Griparna - Allsvenskan
- 2020: Vetlanda
- 2021: Masarna
- 2022: Piraterna
- 2024–2025: Vargarna

Great Britain
- 2021, 2023: Glasgow

Denmark
- 2024: SES

Marcin Nowak (born 18 August 1995) is a Polish speedway rider.

== Speedway career ==
Nowak rode in his native Poland for Grudziądz from 2016 to 2017. In 2021, Nowak signed his first British team contract when he joined the Glasgow Tigers for the SGB Championship 2021. In 2022, he rode for Lodz in Poland and Avesta in Sweden. He also competed in the 2022 Speedway European Championship.

In 2023, Nowak re-signed for Glasgow for the SGB Championship 2023 but left early to return to his Polish club Stal Rzeszów.

In 2024, Nowak signed for Vargarna.
