= Michał Łopaczewski =

Polish speedway rider

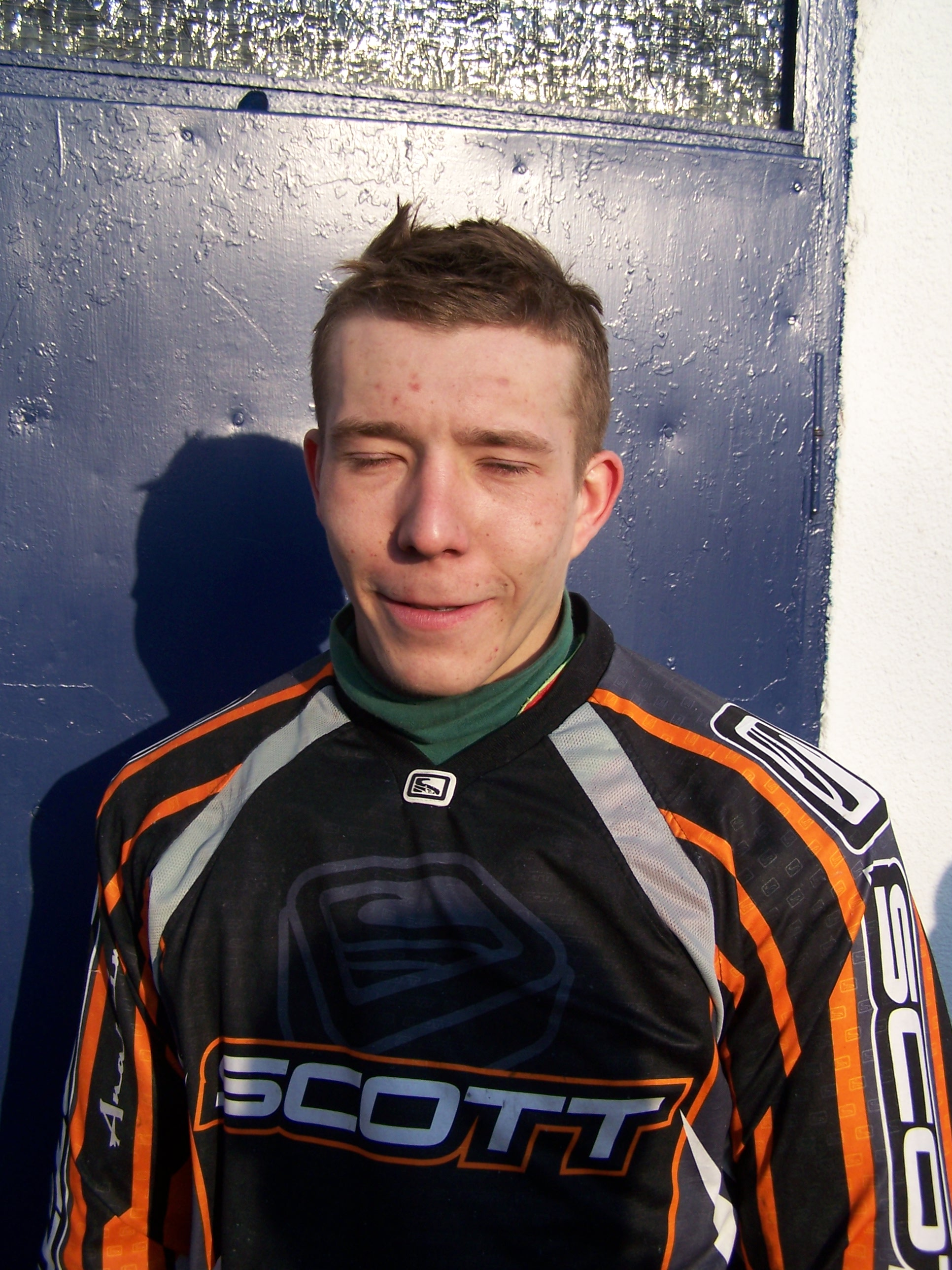
- Born: 2 May 1989 (age 37); Poland
- Nationality: Poland
- Website: Łopaczewski-Racing.pl

Current club information
- Polish league: Polonia Piła

Career history
- 2007: Łódź (POL)
- 2008: Bydgoszcz (POL)
- 2009: Piła (POL)

Michał Łopaczewski (born 2 May 1989 in Poland) is a Polish motorcycle speedway rider who was a member of Poland U-19 national team.

== Career details ==
=== European Championships ===
- Individual U-19 European Championship:
  - 2007 - 9th place in Semi-Final 3
  - 2008 - 10th place in Semi-Final 1
- Team U-19 European Championship:
  - 2008 - (Poland) Rawicz - 4th place (0 pts)

=== Domestic competitions ===
- Individual Polish Championship
  - 2009 - 17th place in Quarter-Final 2 as track reserve
- Individual U-21 Polish Championship:
  - 2008 - (Poland) Rybnik - 16th place (0 pts)
  - 2009 - 14th place in Qualifying Round 1
- Polish Silver Helmet (U-21)
  - 2008 - windraw in Semi-Final 1
  - 2009 - 15th place in Semi-Final 2
- Polish Bronze Helmet (U-19)
  - 2008 - (Poland) Gdańsk - 7th place (8 pts)

== See also ==
- Poland national speedway team
