= Józef Olejniczak =

Polish speedway rider

- Born: 5 September 1918; Haspe, Poland
- Died: 13 March 2001 (aged 82); Leszno, Poland
- Nationality: Polish

Career history

Poland
- 1948–1956: Unia Leszno

Individual honours
- 1950: Polish champion

Team honours
- 1949, 1950, 1951 1952, 1953, 1954: Polish league champions

Józef Olejniczak (5 September 1918 – 13 March 2001) was a motorcycle speedway rider from Poland. He was the 1950 Polish champion.

== Career ==
Olejniczak became the champion of Poland after he won gold at the Polish Individual Speedway Championship in 1950, during the 1950 Polish speedway season.

From 1949 to 1954, Olejniczak won six consecutive Team Speedway Polish Championships, as part of the Unia Leszno team that dominated the Polish leagues from the 1949 Polish speedway season, through to the 1954 Polish speedway season. The Leszno team included riders such as Alfred Smoczyk, Jan Malinowski and Henryk Żyto.

In 2021, the Unia Leszno club applied to the authorities for the square outside the Alfred Smoczyk Stadium to be named after Olejniczak.
