= Moto Arena Łódź =

Stadium in Łódź, Poland

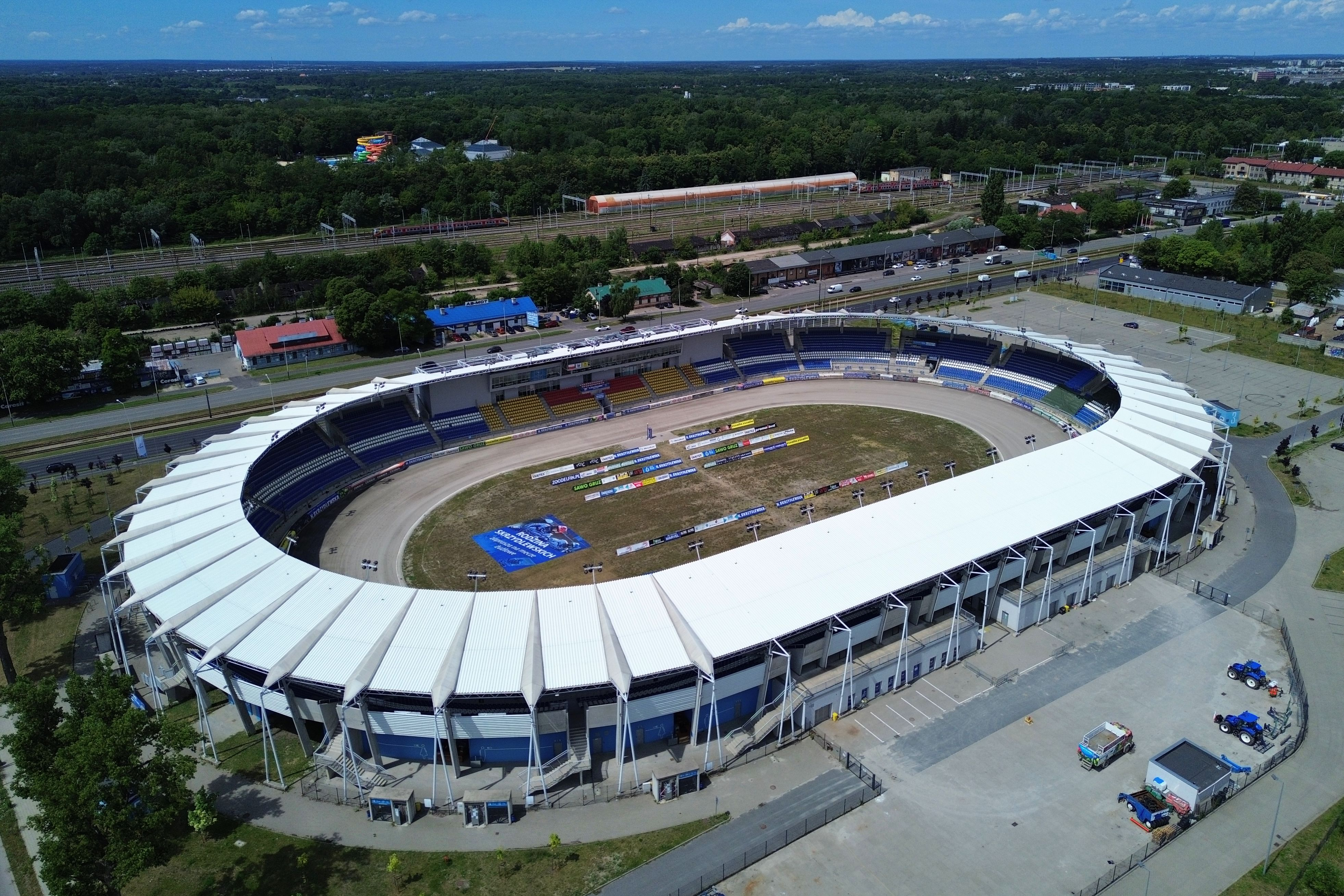
- The stadium in 2024
- Location: 6 Sierpnia, 90-001 Łódź, Poland
- Coordinates: 51°45′54″N 19°25′46″E
- Capacity: 10,353
- Opened: 29 July 2018
- Length: 0.321 km

The Moto Arena Łódź is a 10,350-capacity motorcycle speedway stadium in the north west area of Łódź in Poland.

The venue is used by the speedway team Orzeł Łódź, who compete in the Team Speedway Polish Championship.

== History ==
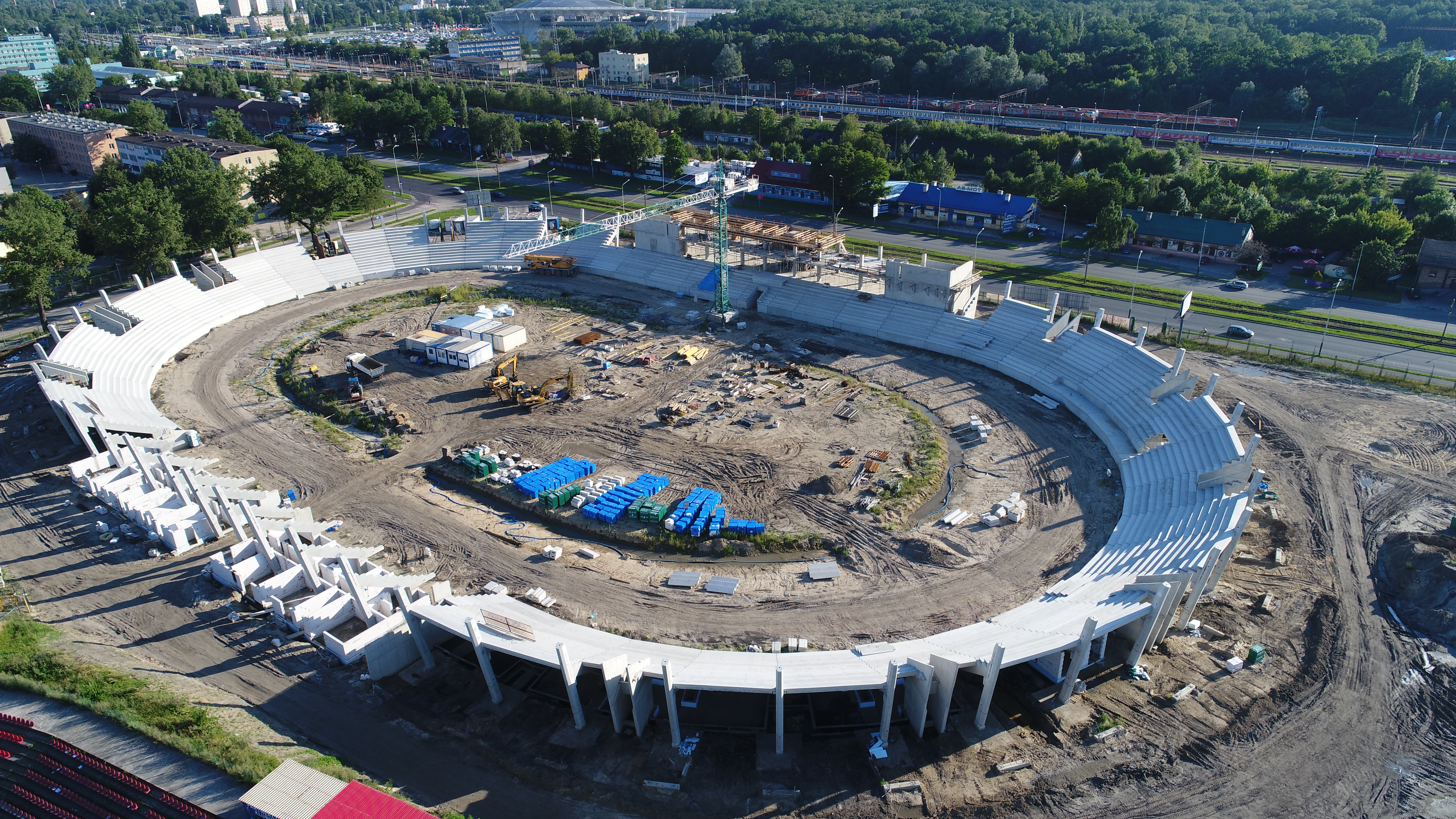
Stadium under construction in 2017

In 2013, the stadium was designed by the KŻ Orzeł racing club and was later approved for construction. The construction took place between 2016 and 2018 adjacent to the old Orzeł speedway stadium. It opened on 29 July 2018 at the cost of Polish złoty 49.8 million.

The biggest event to be held at the track to date was the third round of the 2022 Speedway European Championship, won by Janusz Kołodziej on 3 September 2022.

In 2023, the track record was broken by Jakub Stojanowski, who set a time of 58.12 seconds on 9 August.
