= 1950 Polish speedway season =

Motorcycle racing competition

The 1950 Polish Speedway season was the 1950 season of motorcycle speedway in Poland.

== Individual ==
=== Polish Individual Speedway Championship ===
The 1950 Individual Speedway Polish Championship was held in Kraków on 8 October.

Result and heat details

Placing	Rider	Total	1	2	3	4	5	6	7	8	9	10	11	12	13	14	15	16	17	18	19	20
1	(1) Józef Olejniczak (Unia Leszno)	20	4					4				4				4				4
2	(4) Tadeusz Kołeczek (Ogniwo Łódź)	18	2							4				4				4				4
3	(2) Florian Kapała (Kolejarz Rawicz)	17	3				3				3				4				4
4	(9) Marian Kaznowski (Włókniarz Częstochowa)	16			4		4					3						2		3
5	(6) Janusz Suchecki (Ogniwo Warszawa)	14		4				3			4							3			E
6	(3) Paweł Dziura (Budowlani Rybnik)	13	1						4				1				3				4
7	(13) Tadeusz Fijałkowski (Związkowiec Warszawa)	13				3	2							2		3					3
8	(5) Stefan Maciejewski (Stal Ostrów Wlkp.)	12		3			E					3					4					2
9	(8) Ludwik Rataj (Stal Ostrów Wlkp.)	10		2						3			2			E			3
10	(16) Stanisław Glapiak (Unia Leszno)	10				4				2	2						2			E
11	(12) Piotr Poprawa (Stal Ostrów Wlkp.)	10			3					E		2			3						2
12	(14) Alfred Spyra (Budowlani Rybnik)	9				E		2					E		4							3
13	(10) Zdzisław Smoczyk (Unia Leszno)	6			2			E						3			E		1
14	(15) Jan Siekalski (CWKS Warszawa)	4				E			E			1						1	2
15	(11) Jan Krakowiak (CWKS Warszawa)	0			F				N		N					N						N
16	(7) Jan Malinowski (Unia Grudziądz)	0		F					N					N	N					N
Placing	Rider	Total	1	2	3	4	5	6	7	8	9	10	11	12	13	14	15	16	17	18	19	20

E – retired or mechanical failure • F – fell • N – non-starter

gate A – inside	gate B	gate C	gate D – outside

== Team Speedway Polish Championship ==
The 1950 Team Speedway Polish Championship was the third edition of the Team Polish Championship.

=== Rules ===
In First and Second League, matches were played with part three teams. It made up team four riders plus one reserve. Events consisted of 12 races. In one day were played three three-cornered matches. For winning a match a team received 3 points, for second place 2 points and for third 1 point. In every heat the score was 4–3–2–1 and 0 in a no-completion heat. The drivers with main squad of a team started in the match four times. The quantity of small points was added up.

=== First League ===
Pos	Team	Match	Match Pts	Heats Pts
1	Unia Leszno	4	11.5	186
2	Budowlani Rybnik	4	10	173
3	Stal Ostrów Wlkp.	4	9.5	172
4	Związkowiec Warszawa	4	8	151
5	Kolejarz Rawicz	4	8	145
6	Unia Grudziądz	4	8	144
7	Ogniwo Łódź	4	6.5	127
8	Ogniwo Warszawa	4	6	131
9	Ogniwo Bytom	4	4.5	130

Medalists

Unia Leszno	Józef Olejniczak, Zdzisław Smoczyk, Stanisław Glapiak, Henryk Woźniak
Budowlani Rybnik	Paweł Dziura, Alfred Spyra, Ludwik Draga, Wacław Andrzejewski, Pruski
Stal Ostrów Wlkp.	Stefan Maciejewski, Ludwik Rataj, Piotr Poprawa, Marian Rejek, Bonifacy Szpitalniak, Roman Wielgosz

=== Second League ===
Pos	Team	Match	Match Pts	Heats Pts
1	Gwardia Bydgoszcz	4	11	133
2	Włókniarz Częstochowa	4	11	173
3	CWKS Warszawa	4	9	?
4	Związkowiec Gdańsk	4	8	?
5	Unia Poznań	4	8	140
6	Gwardia Rzeszów	4	7	131
7	Unia Chodzież	3	5	177
8	Włókniarz Łódź	4	4	97
9	Gwardia Kostrzyn	2	0	47
