= Ostrów Wielkopolski Stadium =

Stadium in Ostrów Wielkopolski, Poland

Ostrów Wielkopolski Municipal Stadium
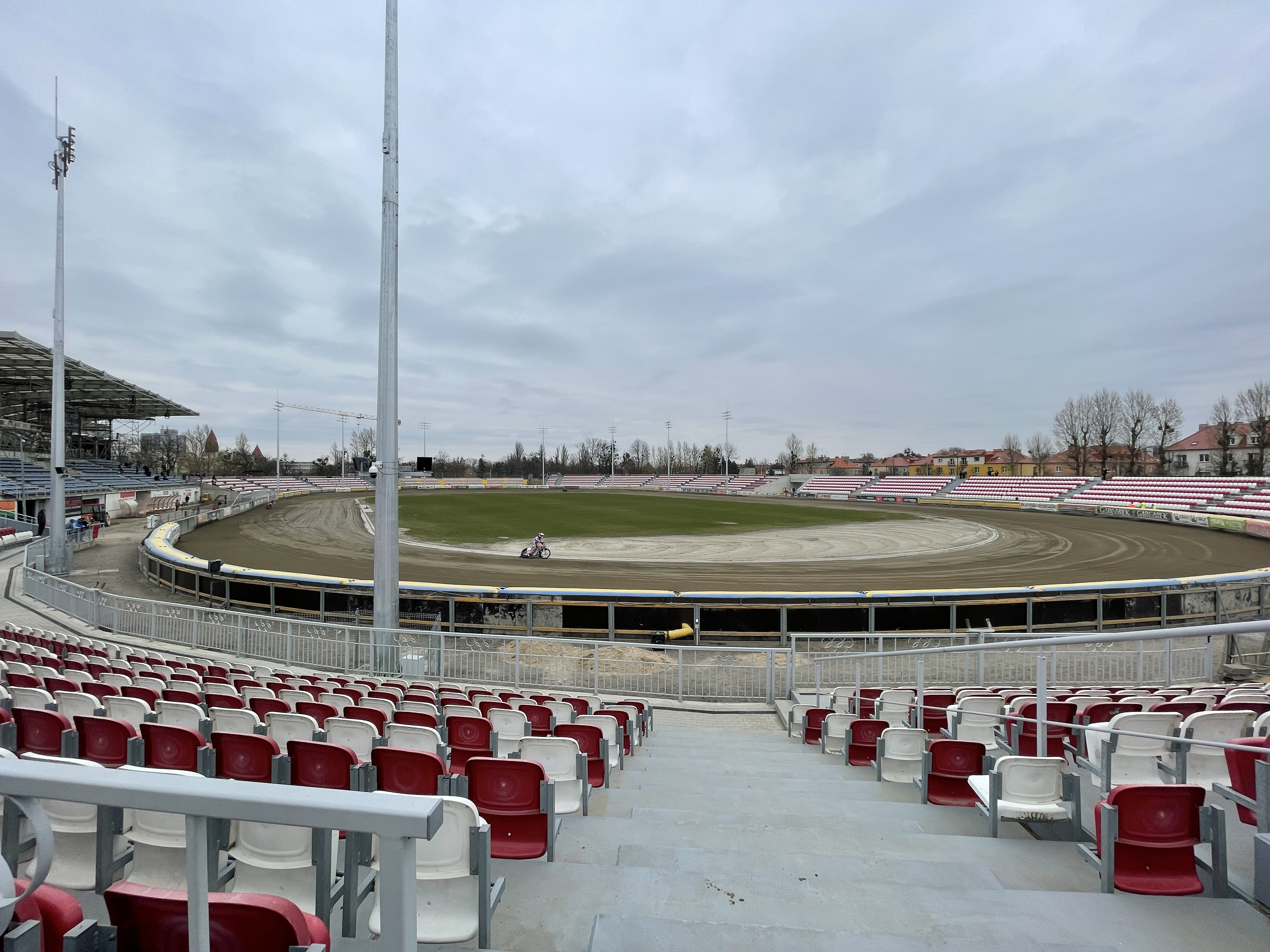
- The stadium in 2022
- Location: Marszałka Józefa Piłsudskiego 64, 63-400 Ostrów Wielkopolski, Poland
- Coordinates: 51°38′35″N 17°49′17″E
- Capacity: 12,000
- Opened: 1928
- Length: 0.372 km

The Ostrów Wielkopolski Municipal Stadium (Polish: Stadion Miejski w Ostrowie Wielkopolskim) is a 12,000-capacity motorcycle speedway and association football stadium in Ostrów Wielkopolski, Poland.

The venue is used by the speedway team TZ Ostrovia Ostrów Wielkopolski, who compete in the Team Speedway Polish Championship and the football team TP Ostrovia Ostrów Wielkopolski.

== History ==
The stadium opened as the Stadium of Physical Education and Military Organisation on 24 June 1928. The speedway track measuring 500 metres was constructed between June and October 1931, with the first speedway match being held on 8 November 1931.

Between 1937 and 1946 the stadium was closed because of World War II. In 1953, the stadium underwent significant changes with earth banks being created and the speedway track was shortened to 387 metres. Further renovation took place in 1973 and 1986, the latter changing the track dimensions to the current 372 metres.

In 2007, a new roofed stand costing PLN 7 million was built in time to host the 2007 Speedway Under-21 World Championship.

From 2015 to 2022 a series of renovation projects took place including modernisation in 2022, costing PLN 15.6 million.
