= 1949 Polish speedway season =

Motorcycle racing competition

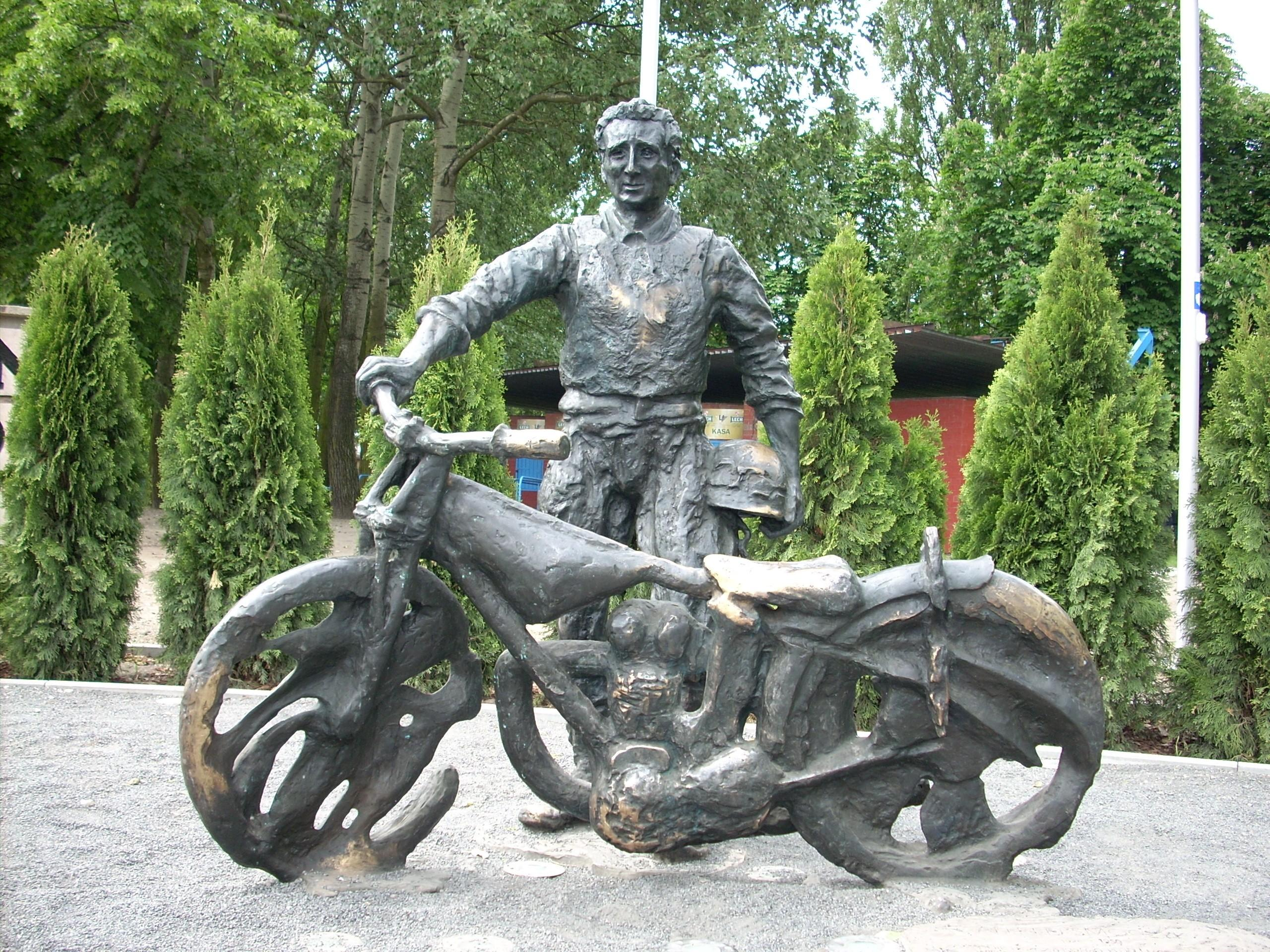
- Statue of Alfred Smoczyk in Leszno

The 1949 Polish Speedway season was the 1949 season of motorcycle speedway in Poland.

== Individual ==
=== Polish Individual Speedway Championship ===
The 1949 Individual Speedway Polish Championship was held in Leszno on 23 October 1949. It was the fifth running of the Championship.

=== Result ===
Pos.	Rider	Club	Points	Total
1	Alfred Smoczyk	(Unia Leszno)	16	(4,4,4,4)
2	Eugeniusz Zendrowski	(Związkowiec Warszawa)	15	(4,3,4,4)
3	Jan Paluch	(Polonia-Ogniwo Bytom)	14	(4,4,2,4)
4	Ludwik Rataj	(KM-Stal Ostrów Wlkp.)	13	(3,3,4,3)
5	Bonifacy Szpitalniak	(KM-Stal Ostrów Wlkp.)	11	(4,1,3,3)
6	Jan Najdrowski	(Olimpia-Unia Grudziądz)	10	(3,3,2,2)
7	Paweł Dziura	(Polonia-Ogniwo Bytom)	9	(2,2,3,2)
8	Ryszard Morawski	(Związkowiec Warszawa)	7	(3,1,N,3)
9	Henryk Woźniak	(Unia Leszno)	6	(E,2,N,4)
10	Tadeusz Kołeczek	(Tramwajarz-Ogniwo Łódź)	5	(2,3,E,E)
11	Czesław Szałkowski	(Olimpia-Unia Grudziądz)	3	(3,E,N,N)
12	Mieczysław Chlebicz	(Związkowiec W-wa)	3	(2,1,F,N)
13	Józef Olejniczak	(Unia Leszno)	0	(E,E,E,N)

E – retired or mechanical failure • F – fell • N – non-starter

== Team Speedway Polish Championship ==
The 1949 Team Speedway Polish Championship was the second edition of the Team Polish Championship.

In First and Second League, matches were played with part three teams. Teams were made up of 3 riders plus 1 reserve. The event consisted of 9 races. In one day were played three three-cornered matches. For winning a match a team received 3 points, for second place 2 points, and for third 1 point. In every heat scoring was 3–2–1 and 0 if no-completion heat. The drivers with the main squad of a team started in a match 3 times. The quantity of small points was added up.

=== First League ===
Pos	Team	Match	Match Pts	Heats Pts
1	Unia Leszno	4	12	98
2	KM-Stal Ostrów Wlkp.	4	8.5	82
2	Skra-Związkowiec Warszawa	4	8.5	72
4	Polonia-Ogniwo Bytom	4	8.5	71
5	PKM-Ogniwo Warszawa	4	8	59
6	Olimpia-Unia Grudziądz	4	7.5	62
7	Tramwajarz-Ogniwo Łódź	4	7	67
8	RKM-Budowlani Rybnik	4	7	57
9	MK-Kolejarz Rawicz	4	5	54

Any team was relegated to lower division.

Medalists

Unia Leszno	Józef Olejniczak 2.84, Alfred Smoczyk 3.00, Henryk Woźniak 2.08, Wacław Andrzejewski, Juchniak
Stal Ostrów Wlkp.	Stefan Maciejewski 2.50, Bonifacy Szpitalniak, Ludwik Rataj, Piotr Poprawa, Marian Rejek
Skra-Związkowiec Warszawa	Ryszard Morawski, Jan Kwaśniewski, Eugeniusz Zendrowski 2.58, Jan Filipczak, Jan Wąsikowski

=== Second League ===
Pos	Team	Match	Match Pts	Heats Pts
1	Polonia-Gwardia Bydgoszcz	4	11	90
2	CTCiM Częstochowa	4	11	84
3	GKM-Związkowiec Gdańsk	4	10	71
4	RTKM-Gwardia Rzeszów	4	9	78
5	Unia Chodzież	4	8	62
6	Unia Poznań	4	6	54
7	Motoklub Rawicz II	3	4	40
8	DKM-Włókniarz Łódź	3	3	26
9	Lechia-Włókniarz Poznań	3	3	26

Event between Rawicz, Łódź and Poznań was cancelled and never replayed.
