= Alfred Smoczyk Stadium =

Stadium in Leszno, Poland

- Stadion im. Alfreda Smoczyka (Polish)
- Smok (Dragon)
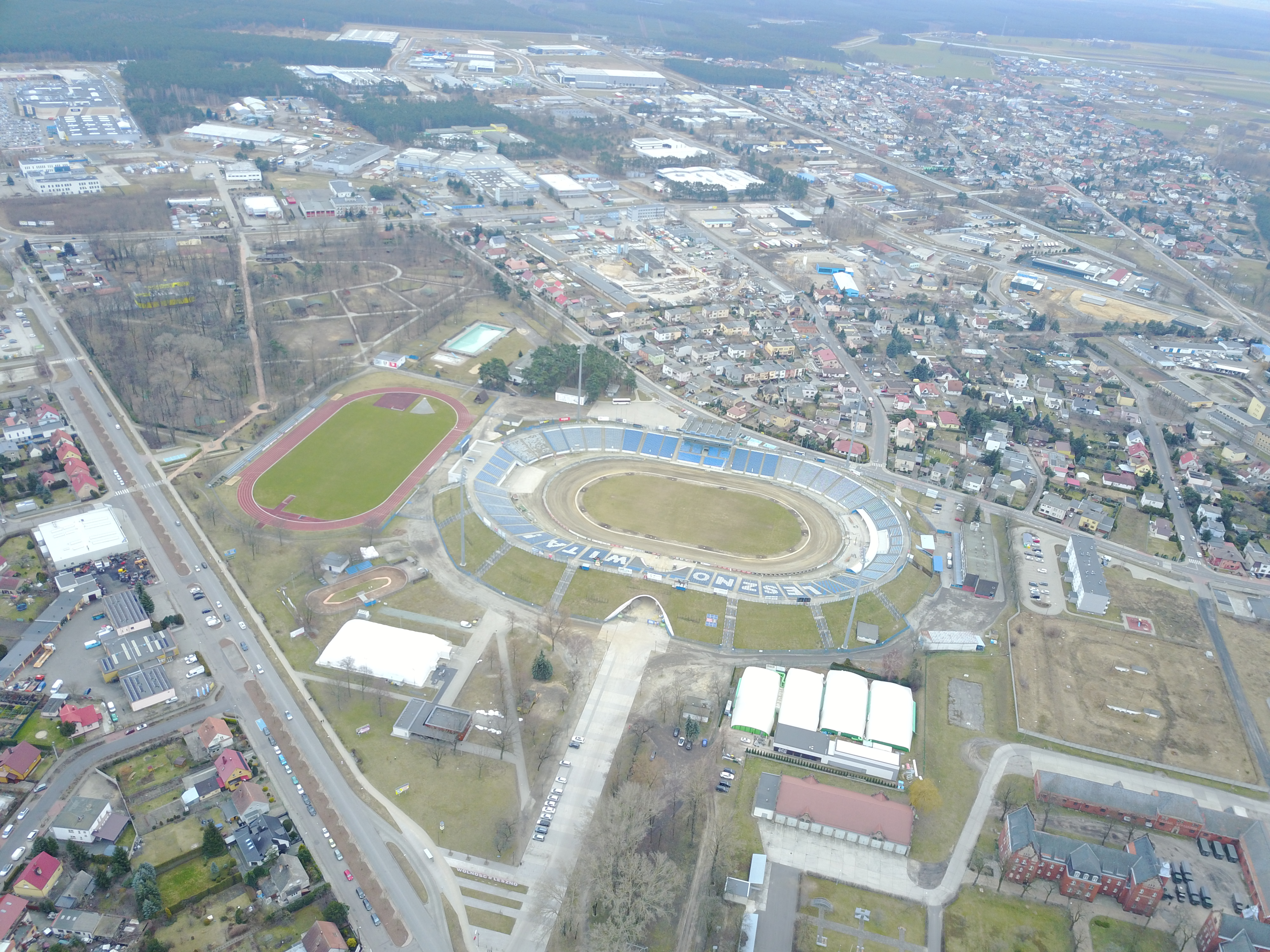
- Aerial photograph with the stadium in the middle
- Interactive map of Alfred Smoczyk Stadium
- Location: Leszno, Poland
- Coordinates: 51°49′57″N 16°35′8″E
- Owner: City of Leszno
- Operator: Unia Leszno
- Capacity: 16,700
- Surface: Shale (speedway)

Construction
- Opened: 19 April 1953
- Expanded: 11 September 1977

Tenant
- Unia Leszno

Alfred Smoczyk Stadium (Polish: Stadion im. Alfreda Smoczyka) is a stadium in Leszno, Poland. It is currently used for speedway matches and is the home stadium of Unia Leszno. The stadium has a capacity of 16,700 people.

The stadium is located on ulica Strzelecka 7.

== History ==
Alfred Smoczyk (1928–1950) was the first Polish speedway superstar. He successfully competed on Dutch tracks in the late 1940s, but died in a road accident in October 1950. He was the first Individual Polish Champion after World War II (in 1949). The year after his death in 1951, the Alfred Smoczyk Memorial event was first held and shortly afterwards in April 1952, plans were put into action to build a new speedway stadium.

The opening of the new stadium took place on 19 April 1953. In 1960, the stadium hosted a qualifying round of the Speedway World Championship.

In 1974/75 the track was replaced and the stands were expanded to increase the capacity to 40,000. In 1977, as part of the national harvest celebrations and the visit of Edward Gierek to Leszno, the stadium underwent a major renovation and modernisation, opening on 11 September 1977.

In 1984, the stadium held the first of four World Cup finals, the first being the 1984 edition followed by 2007, 2009 and 2017. In-between, it also hosted the final of the 1989 Speedway World Pairs Championship.

The stadium has hosted the Speedway Grand Prix of Europe (a round of the world championship) for five consecutive years from 2008 to 2012.

== Track details ==
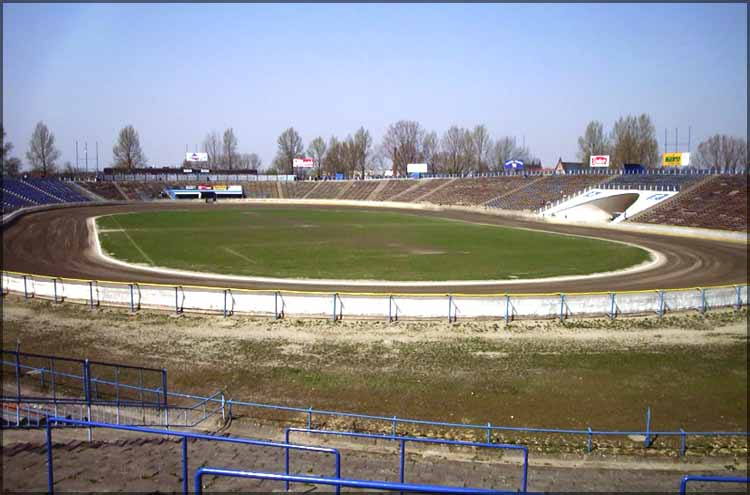
the speedway track in 2008

The track is 330 metres (360 yards) long and has a syenite surface. The track record was made by Janusz Kołodziej (58.12 sec on 9 May 2010).

=== Records ===
383 m (1953–1975)
Time	Date	Rider	Club	Meeting
80.0	19.04.1953	(Poland) Stanisław Glapiak	Leszno	friendly: Leszno - Ostrów Wlkp.
77.7	05.07.1953	(Poland) Marian Kuśnierek	Leszno	1st League: Leszno - Łódź
77.1	16.08.1953	(Poland) Edward Kupczyński	Wrocław	1st League: Leszno - Wrocław
76.7	16.08.1953	(Poland) Józef Olejniczak	Leszno	1st League: Leszno - Wrocław
76.4	16.08.1953	(Poland) Józef Olejniczak	Leszno	1st League: Leszno - Wrocław
76.0	13.09.1953	(Poland) Florian Kapała	Rawicz	III Alfred Smoczyk Memorial
76.0	13.06.1954	(Poland) Andrzej Krzesiński	Leszno	1st League: Leszno - Wrocław
75.3	21.08.1955	(Poland) Edward Kupczyński	Wrocław	V Alfred Smoczyk Memorial
??.?	11.04.1960	(Poland) Kazimierz Bentke	Leszno	1st League: Leszno - Częstochowa
74.8	before 22.05.1960	(Sweden) Ove Fundin	-	?
74.0	16.10.1960	(England) Peter Craven	-	Poland - England
73.9	21.05.1961	(Poland) Henryk Żyto	Leszno	1st League: Leszno - Częstochowa
73.8	14.04.1963	(Poland) Henryk Żyto	Leszno	Polish Motor Union Cup
73.2	08.10.1967	(Poland) Henryk Gluecklich	Bydgoszcz	Poland - Soviet Union
73.1	24.10.1971	(Poland) Zdzisław Dobrucki	Leszno	XXI Aldred Smoczyk Memorial

354 m (1975–1979)
Time	Date	Rider	Club	Meeting
76.4	23.03.1975	(Poland) Kazimierz Adamczak	Leszno	friendly: Leszno - Guestrow
76.0	13.04.1975	(Poland) Jerzy Kowalski	Leszno	Individual Meeting
76.0	20.04.1975	(Poland) Piotr Bruzda	Wrocław	1st League: Leszno - Wrocław
75.4	20.04.1975	(Poland) Zygfryd Kostka	Wrocław	1st League: Leszno - Wrocław
75.4	20.04.1975	(Poland) Zbigniew Jąder	Leszno	1st League: Leszno - Wrocław
74.5	01.05.1975	(Poland) Henryk Gluecklich	Bydgoszcz	1st League: Leszno - Bydgoszcz
74.5	01.05.1975	(Poland) Jerzy Kowalski	Leszno	1st League: Leszno - Bydgoszcz
73.4	05.06.1975	(Poland) Bogusław Nowak	Gorzów Wlkp.	Golden Helmet
73.0	28.06.1975	(Poland) Zdzisław Dobrucki	Leszno	Pairs Meeting
71.6	29.08.1976	(Poland) Bernard Jąder	Leszno	Alfred Smoczyk Memorial
71.4	26.06.1977	(Poland) Roman Jankowski	Leszno	U-23 Polish Motor Union Cup
71.4	03.07.1977	(Poland) Bernard Jąder	Leszno	1st League: Leszno - Opole
71.3	24.07.1977	(Poland) Zdzisław Dobrucki	Leszno	1st League: Leszno - Lublin
70.6	31.07.1977	(Poland) Józef Jarmuła	Częstochowa	1st League: Leszno - Częstochowa
70.0	28.08.1977	(Poland) Zenon Plech	Gdańsk	1st League: Leszno - Gdańsk
70.0	21.05.1978	(Poland) Bernard Jąder	Leszno	1st League: Leszno - Rybnik
70.0	21.05.1978	(Poland) Mariusz Okoniewski	Leszno	1st League: Leszno - Rybnik
69.2	04.06.1978	(England) Malcolm Simmons	-	International Individual Meeting
69.0	04.06.1978	(Poland) Bernard Jąder	Leszno	International Individual Meeting
68.0	28.06.1978	(Poland) Bernard Jąder	Leszno	Individual Meeting

347 m (1979–1987)
Time	Date	Rider	Club	Meeting
70.1	12.04.1979	(Poland) Eugeniusz Miastkowski	Toruń	Individual Polish Championship Quarter-Final
68.6	22.04.1979	(Poland) Piotr Pyszny	Rybnik	1st League: Leszno - Rybnik
68.1	29.04.1979	(Poland) Mariusz Okoniewski	Leszno	1st League: Leszno - Wrocław
68.1	29.04.1979	(Poland) Mariusz Okoniewski	Leszno	1st League: Leszno - Wrocław
67.4	19.08.1979	(Poland) Ryszard Buśkiewicz	Leszno	1st League: Leszno - Gdańsk
67.4	22.07.1980	(Poland) Bogusław Nowak	Gorzów	Individual Polish Championship Final
66.2	22.07.1980	(Poland) Edward Jancarz	Gorzów	Individual Polish Championship Final
65.0	14.06.1981	(Poland) Edward Jancarz	Gorzów	Individual World Championship Continental Semi-Final

342 m (since 1987)
Time	Date	Rider	Club	Meeting
65.8	08.04.1987	(Poland) Zenon Kasprzak	Leszno	Poland - Sweden
65.8	14.04.1987	(Poland) Zenon Kasprzak	Leszno	1st League: Leszno - Gorzów Wlkp.
63.51	13.06.1987	(Hungary) Zoltan Adorjan	-	Individual World Championship Continental Semi-Final
63.35	06.08.1988	(Poland) Zenon Kasprzak	Leszno	Individual World Championship Continental Final
63.0	25.09.1988	(Poland) Zenon Kasprzak	Leszno	Individual Polish Championship Final
62.6	05.08.1989	(Denmark) Erik Gundersen	-	World Pairs Championship Final
62.6	1993	(Poland) Roman Jankowski	Leszno	FSO Individual Meeting
62.6	21.05.1994	(Poland) Roman Jankowski	Leszno	2nd League: Leszno - Lublin
62.4	21.05.1994	(Poland) Roman Jankowski	Leszno	2nd League: Leszno - Lublin
62.2	15.07.1995	(Poland) Tomasz Gollob	Bydgoszcz	XLV Alfred Smoczyk Memorial
61.6	16.06.1996	(Poland) Roman Jankowski	Leszno	2nd League: Leszno - Łódź
60.5	16.06.1996	(Australia) Leigh Adams	Leszno	2nd League: Leszno - Łódź
60.2	28.05.2000	(Australia) Leigh Adams	Leszno	Ekstraliga: Leszno - Gdańsk
60.2	21.04.2002	(Poland) Rafał Okoniewski	Leszno	Ekstraliga: Leszno - Wrocław
60.0	21.04.2002	(Poland) Krzysztof Kasprzak	Leszno	Ekstraliga: Leszno - Wrocław
59.0	03.05.2002	(Australia) Leigh Adams	Leszno	Ekstraliga: Leszno - Częstochowa
58.4	03.05.2007	(Poland) Krzysztof Kasprzak	Leszno	Ekstraliga: Leszno - Zielona Góra
58.1	09.05.2010	(Poland) Janusz Kołodziej	Leszno	?

== See also ==
- Motorcycle speedway
