= Speedway in Poland =

Overview of the motorcycle sport in Poland

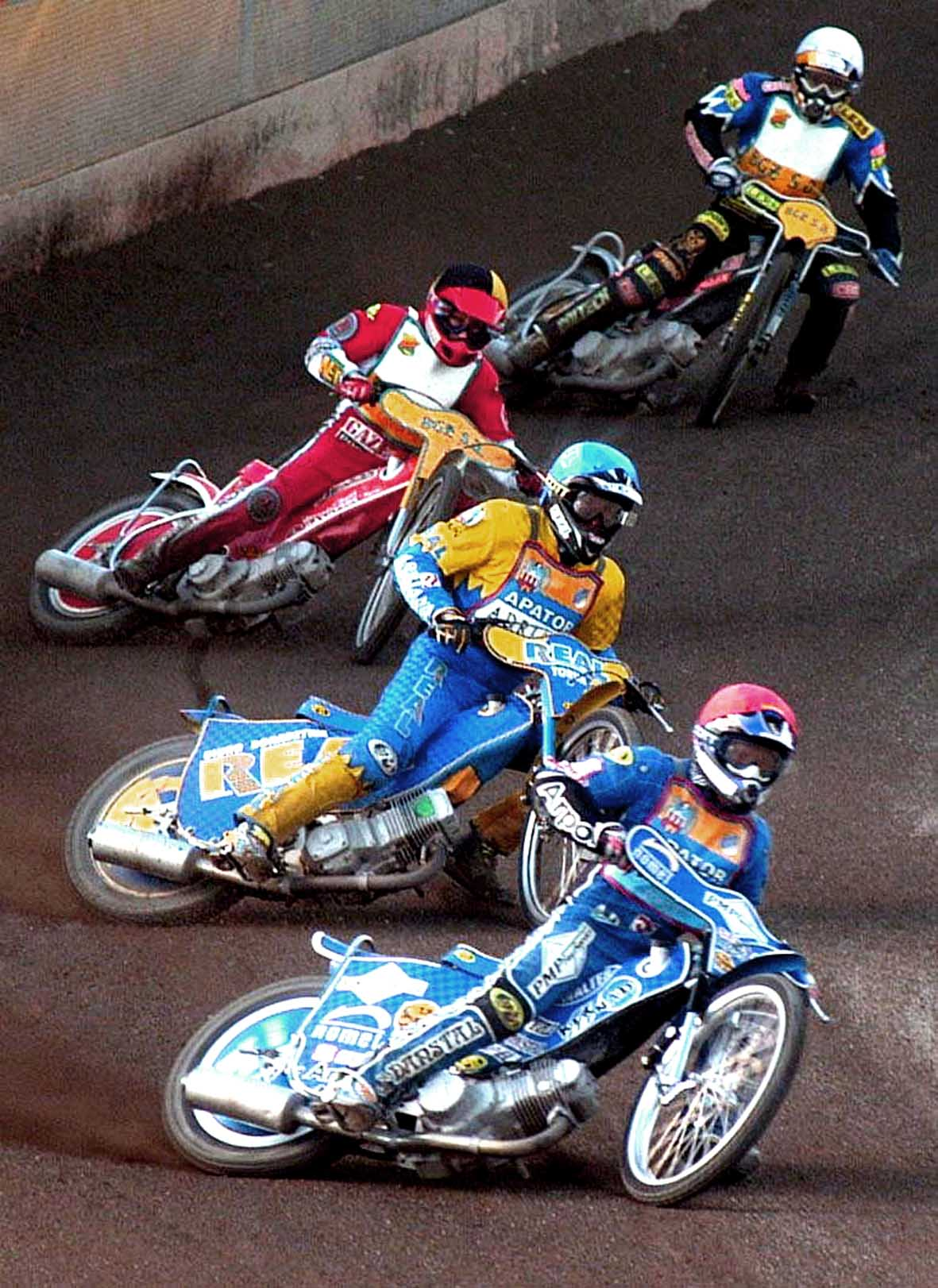
Match Apator Toruń - Polonia Piła

Speedway is one of the most popular sports in Poland. The Ekstraliga has the second highest average attendances for any sport in Poland. The first meetings in Poland were held in the 1930s.

Speedway in Poland is governed by the Main Commission of Speedway Sport (Główna Komisja Sportu Żużlowego, GKSŻ) which is a part of the Polish Motor Union (Polski Związek Motorowy, PZM). PZM is a member of the Fédération Internationale de Motocyclisme (FIM) and the Union Européenne de Motocyclisme (UEM).

== National team ==
Poland has produced three Individual World Champion - Jerzy Szczakiel who won in 1973, Tomasz Gollob who won in the 2010 Individual Speedway World Championships and Bartosz Zmarzlik who won in 2019, 2021, 2022, 2023 and 2024. Polish junior riders are among the best in the world. The Polish National U-21 team won the Under 21 World Championship since 2005 in every year (lately in 2007). Besides, since 2000 Polish juniors won medals of Individual U-21 World Championship. Polish riders have been World Champions seven times at Under 21 level (lately Karol Ząbik at the 2006 ISJWC).

== Championships ==
There are three types of speedway championships in Poland: individual (Indywidualne Mistrzostwa Polski, IMP), pairs (Mistrzostwa Polski Par Klubowych, MPPK), and team, consisting of three leagues (Drużynowe Mistrzostwa Polski, DMP). The Junior U-21 championships also consist of three categories: individual (Młodzieżowe Indywidualne Mistrzostwa Polski, MIMP), pairs (Młodzieżowe Mistrzostwa Polski Par Klubowych, MMPPK), and team (Młodzieżowe Drużynowe Mistrzostwa Polski, MDMP).

	Poland (Polish Motor Union, PZM)
	Individual	Pair	Team
Seniors	Individual Speedway Polish Championship (since 1932/1949)	Polish Pairs Speedway Championship (since 1974)	Team Speedway Polish Championship (since 1948)
Juniors U-21	MIMP (od 1967)	MMPPK (since 1983)	MDMP (since 1978)

=== Teams (league competition) ===
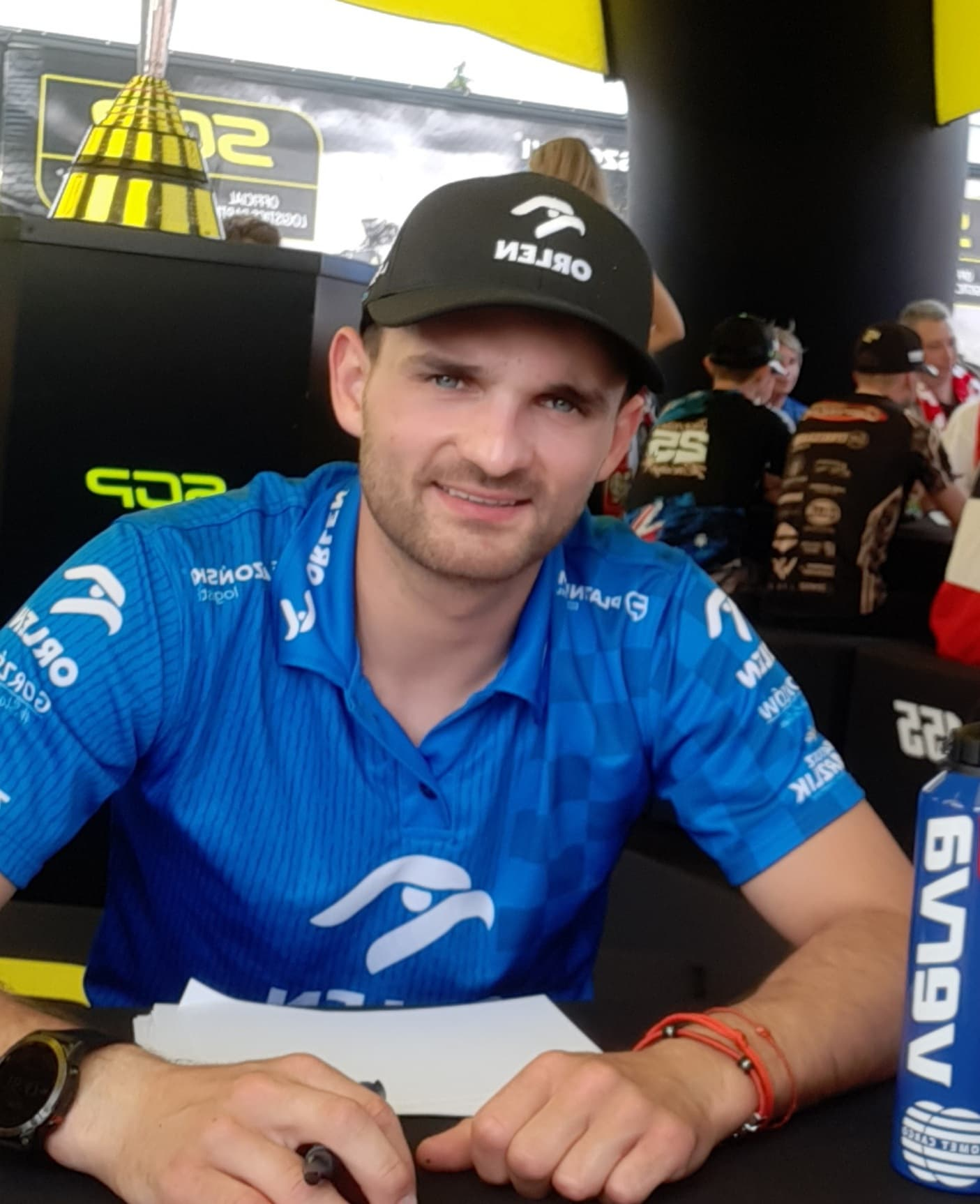
Current Polish champion, Bartosz Zmarzlik

There are three speedway leagues in Poland:

1. Ekstraliga (Ekstraliga żużlowa) (Team Speedway Polish Championship)
2. Polish Speedway First League (eWinner 1.liga żużlowa)
3. Polish Speedway Second League (2. liga żużlowa)

In the 2009 season, the Extraleague and First League have eight teams competing. The second League has seven teams. Notably, KS Toruń (since 1976) has never been relegated to a lower division until the 2019 season when the team was relegated for the first time in the history.

== Competitions ==
=== Polish Cup ===
- Individual Speedway Polish Cup (Indywidualny Puchar Polski, IPP)
- Team Speedway Polish Cup (Drużynowy Puchar Polski, DPP)

=== Helmets competition ===
GKSŻ organizes the Golden Helmet, Silver Helmet and Bronze Helmet competitions.

1. The Golden Helmet (Złoty Kask, ZK) is a single meeting held in PC Team 3rd from last season (before usually in Wrocław), with the top twelve riders in the Extraleague and the top four riders in the First League. The Winner get a new motorcycle Java.
2. The Silver Helmet (Srebrny Kask, SK) is an individual competition for riders under 21 years of age for the top sixteen riders in the Extraleague, the top ten riders in the First League, and the six two riders in the Second League competing. A Final event held in PC Team U-21 3rd from last season.
3. The Bronze Helmet (Brązowy Kask, BK) is an individual competition similar to the Silver Helmet except the riders must be under 19 years of age. Riders are nominated for this competition by their teams.

=== Friendly competition ===
Other competitions include (individual meetings), e.g.:

1. Mieczysław Połukard Criterium of Polish Speedway Leagues Aces (Kryterium Asów Polskich Lig Żużlowych im. Mieczysława Połukarda) held in the Polonia Stadium in Bydgoszcz. It is seen by riders and fans as the official opening of the new season. First staged in 1982, although a similar meeting was held in the 1950s.
2. Crest Chain of Ostrów Town (Łańcuch Herbowy Miasta Ostrowa) held in Ostrów Wielkopolski. It is the official end of season meeting. First staged in 1978.
3. Alfred Smoczyk Memorial (Memoriał im. Alfreda Smoczyka) Alfred Smoczyk was the first Polish speedway superstar. He successfully competed on Dutch tracks in the late 1940s, but died in a road accident in October 1950. This meeting has been held every year since 1951 in Leszno, where he lived, in the Alfred Smoczyk Stadium.
4. Edward Jancarz Memorial (Memoriał im. Edwarda Jancarza) in Gorzów Wielkopolski.

== Speedway Grand Prix in Poland ==
Current Grand Prix

1. Gorzów at Jancarz Stadium (2022–2023)
2. Toruń at MotoArena Toruń (2010–2023)
3. Warsaw at Stadion Narodowy (2015–2019, 2022–2023)

Previously, SGP events hosted in:

1. Bydgoszcz at Polonia Stadium (1998–2010 and 2013–2014)
2. Chorzów at Silesian Stadium (2002–2003)
3. Leszno at Alfred Smoczyk Stadium (2008–2012)
4. Lublin at Stadion MOSiR (2021)
5. Wrocław at Olympic Stadium (1995–1997, 1999, 2004–2007, 2019–2022)

== Panorama ==
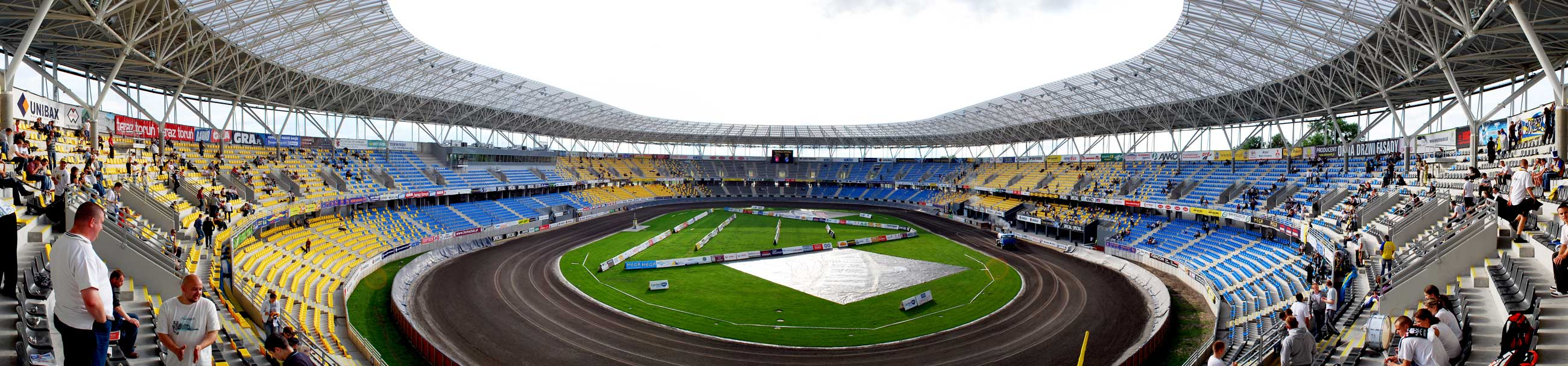
Panorama of MotoArena Toruń, motorcycle speedway stadium of KS Toruń in the Speedway Ekstraliga; home of the International Speedway Grand Prix of Poland available on YouTube

== Famous riders ==
- Tomasz Gollob (born 1971): Individual Polish Champion eight times (lately in 2009), 2nd ever Polish World Champion in 2010
- Jarosław Hampel (b.1982): three times Speedway World Championship medallist
- Rune Holta (born 1973): the only Individual Polish Champion winner who is a naturalized citizen of Poland (born Norwegian).
- Andrzej Huszcza (born 1957): has been riding since 1975 till 2007
- Edward Jancarz (1946–1992)
- Zenon Plech (b. 1953): Individual Polish Champion five times, double WC Individual medallist (1973 and 1979)
- Mieczysław Połukard (1930–1985): the first Polish rider to ride in the Individual World Championship Final in 1959
- Alfred Smoczyk (1928–1950): the first PC Individual champion after World War II (in 1949)
- Jerzy Szczakiel (b. 1949): the first Polish World Champion in 1973
- Paweł Waloszek (b. 1938): the first silver WC Individual medallist (1970)
- Antoni Woryna (b. 1941): the first WC Individual medallist (bronze in 1966) and the first double WC Individual medallist (bronze in 1970)
- Bartosz Zmarzlik (b. 1995): the first Polish five-times World Champion (2019, 2020, 2022-2024)

== Attendances ==
The 2025 Ekstraliga attendances:

Club	Average
Betard Sparta Wrocław	13,675
PGD Toruń	13,029
Falubaz Zielona Góra	10,098
Motor Lublin	8,736
ROW Rybnik	8,011
Włókniarz Częstochowa	7,963
Stal Gorzów	7,915
GKM Grudziądz	7,444
Average	9,625

== See also ==
- Motorcycle speedway
- Speedway in the United Kingdom
- Sport in Poland
