= 2022 Speedway European Championship =

Motorcycle racing competition

Season details
- Dates: 2 July – 23 September
- Events: 4
- Cities: 4
- Countries: 3
- Riders: 15 permanents 1 wild card(s); 2 track reserves
- Heats: (in 4 events)

Winners
- Champion: DEN Leon Madsen
- Runner-up: POL Janusz Kołodziej
- 3rd place: DEN Mikkel Michelsen

The 2022 Speedway European Championship season was the 10th season of the Speedway European Championship (SEC) era, and the 22nd UEM Individual Speedway European Championship. It was the ninth series under the promotion of One Sport Lts. of Poland. Mikkel Michelsen was the defending champion having won the title in 2021.

The title was won by Denmark's Leon Madsen after he overtook former series leader Janusz Kołodziej in the final round to win by just one point. It was the second time Madsen won the title after claiming the championship in 2018.

== Qualification ==
For the 2022 season, 15 permanent riders were joined at each SEC Final by one wildcard and two track reserves.

Defending champion, Mikkel Michelsen from Denmark was automatically invited to participate in all final events, while Leon Madsen, Patryk Dudek, Piotr Pawlicki Jr. and Dan Bewley secured their participation in all final events thanks to being in the top five of the general classification in the 2021 season.

Five riders qualified through the SEC Challenge, while David Bellego, Kai Huckenbeck, Václav Milík, Oliver Berntzon and Janusz Kołodziej were named as series wildcards.

=== Qualified riders ===
#	Riders	2021 place	SEC Ch place	Appearance
155	(Denmark) Mikkel Michelsen	1		5th
30	(Denmark) Leon Madsen	2		7th
692	(Poland) Patryk Dudek	3		3rd
777	(Poland) Piotr Pawlicki Jr.	4		3rd
99	(United Kingdom) Dan Bewley	5		2nd
29	(Latvia) Andžejs Ļebedevs	11	1	6th
96	(France) Dimitri Bergé		2	1st
67	(Denmark) Rasmus Jensen		3	1st
115	(Poland) Bartosz Smektała	6	4	4th
299	(United Kingdom) Adam Ellis		5	1st
415	(France) David Bellego	17	7	4th
744	(Germany) Kai Huckenbeck	9	8	5th
225	(Czech Republic) Václav Milík	10	9	8th
93	(Sweden) Oliver Berntzon		15	1st
333	(Poland) Janusz Kołodziej			4th

== Calendar ==
=== Qualification ===
The top five riders from the SEC Challenge qualified for the championship series.

Round	Date	Venue	Winner
1	18 June	(Slovenia) Matija Gubec Stadium, Krško	(Latvia) Andžejs Ļebedevs

=== Championship Series ===
The 2022 series was staged over four rounds.

Round	Date	Venue	Winner
1	2 July	(Poland) Rybnik Municipal Stadium, Rybnik	(Denmark) Leon Madsen
2	6 August	(Germany) Stadion Güstrow, Güstrow	(Poland) Janusz Kołodziej
3	3 September	(Poland) Moto Arena Łódź, Łódź	(Poland) Janusz Kołodziej
4	23 September	(Czech Republic) Svítkov Stadium, Pardubice	(Denmark) Mikkel Michelsen

== Final Classification ==
Pos.	Rider	Points	(Poland)	(Germany)	(Poland)	(Czech Republic)
1	(Denmark) (30) Leon Madsen	53	13	12	15	13
2	(Poland) (333) Janusz Kołodziej	52	14	15	12	11
3	(Denmark) (155) Mikkel Michelsen	45	14	11	6	14
4	(Poland) (692) Patryk Dudek	42	12	14	9	7
5	(Poland) (19) Dominik Kubera	33	6	–	15	12
6	(Denmark) (67) Rasmus Jensen	31	5	8	8	10
7	(United Kingdom) (99) Dan Bewley	30	–	12	8	10
8	(Poland) (115) Bartosz Smektała	29	11	7	8	3
9	(Poland) (777) Piotr Pawlicki Jr.	28	10	6	5	7
10	(Sweden) (93) Oliver Berntzon	28	10	3	7	8
11	(Latvia) (29) Andžejs Ļebedevs	23	1	6	11	5
12	(France) (415) David Bellego	20	3	10	2	5
13	(France) (96) Dimitri Bergé	20	9	1	5	5
14	(Poland) (16) Kacper Woryna	18	8	–	10	–
15	(Czech Republic) (225) Václav Milík	15	1	8	2	4
16	(Germany) (744) Kai Huckenbeck	12	7	5	–	–
17	(United Kingdom) (299) Adam Ellis	12	2	3	2	5
18	(Czech Republic) (16) Jan Kvěch	7	–	–	–	7
19	(Germany) (16) Michael Hartel	5	–	5	–	–
20	(Poland) (17) Marcin Nowak	1	–	–	1	–
21	(Poland) (18) Jakub Krawczyk	0	–	–	0	–
22	(Czech Republic) (17) Petr Chlupáč	0	–	–	–	0

== See also ==
- 2022 Speedway Grand Prix
