= Łukasz Sówka =

Polish speedway rider

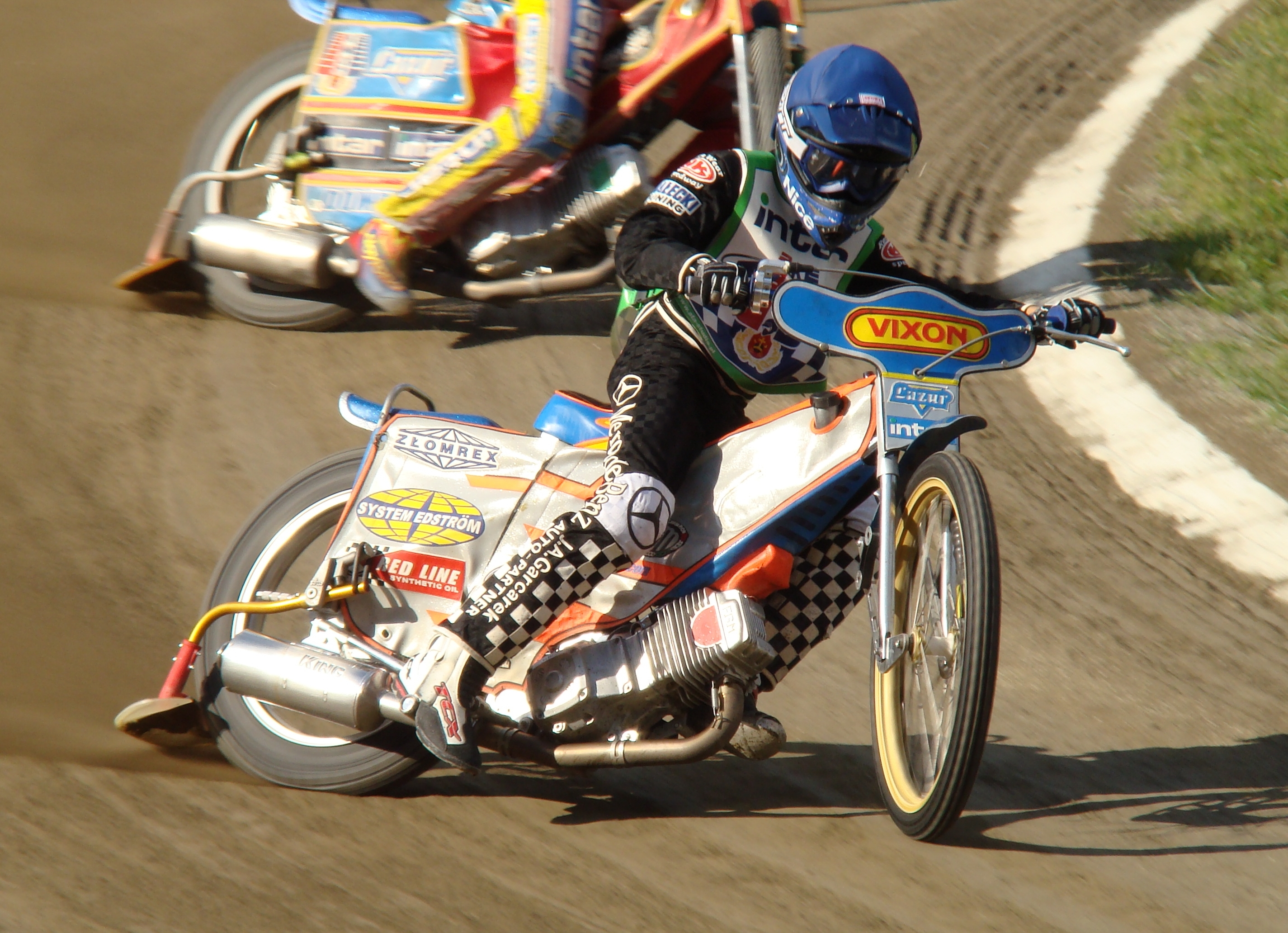
- Born: 7 November 1993 (age 33); Ostrów Wielkopolski, Poland
- Nationality: Polish

Career history

Poland
- 2010: Zielona Góra
- 2011–2012, 2017: Ostrów
- 2012–2015: Rzeszów
- 2015: Gdańsk
- 2016: Bydgoszcz

Great Britain
- 2012: Wolverhampton Wolves

Łukasz Sówka (born 7 November 1993) is a former speedway rider from Poland.

== Speedway career ==
Sówka rode in the Team Speedway Polish Championship for Zielona Góra, Ostrów, Rzeszów, Gdańsk and Bydgoszcz.

Sówka rode in the top tier of British Speedway for the Wolverhampton Wolves during the 2012 Elite League speedway season, but was released mid-way through the season.

Sówka last raced in 2017 for Ostrovia Ostrów in Poland.
