= Orzeł Łódź =

Polish speedway team

Club information
- Track address: Moto Arena Łódź; Łódź
- Country: Poland
- Founded: 2006
- Team manager: Maciej Jąder
- League: Ekstraliga 2
- Website: Official website

Club facts
- Track size: 321 metres (351 yd)
- Track record time: 58.48
- Track record date: 19 September 2020
- Track record holder: Jack Holder

Major team honours
2. Liga	2010

Orzeł Łódź (Eagle Łódź) is a Polish motorcycle speedway team based in Łódź who currently race in the Polish Speedway First League (2. Ekstraliga). The club's full name is H. Skrzydlewska Orzeł Łódź.

== Stadium ==
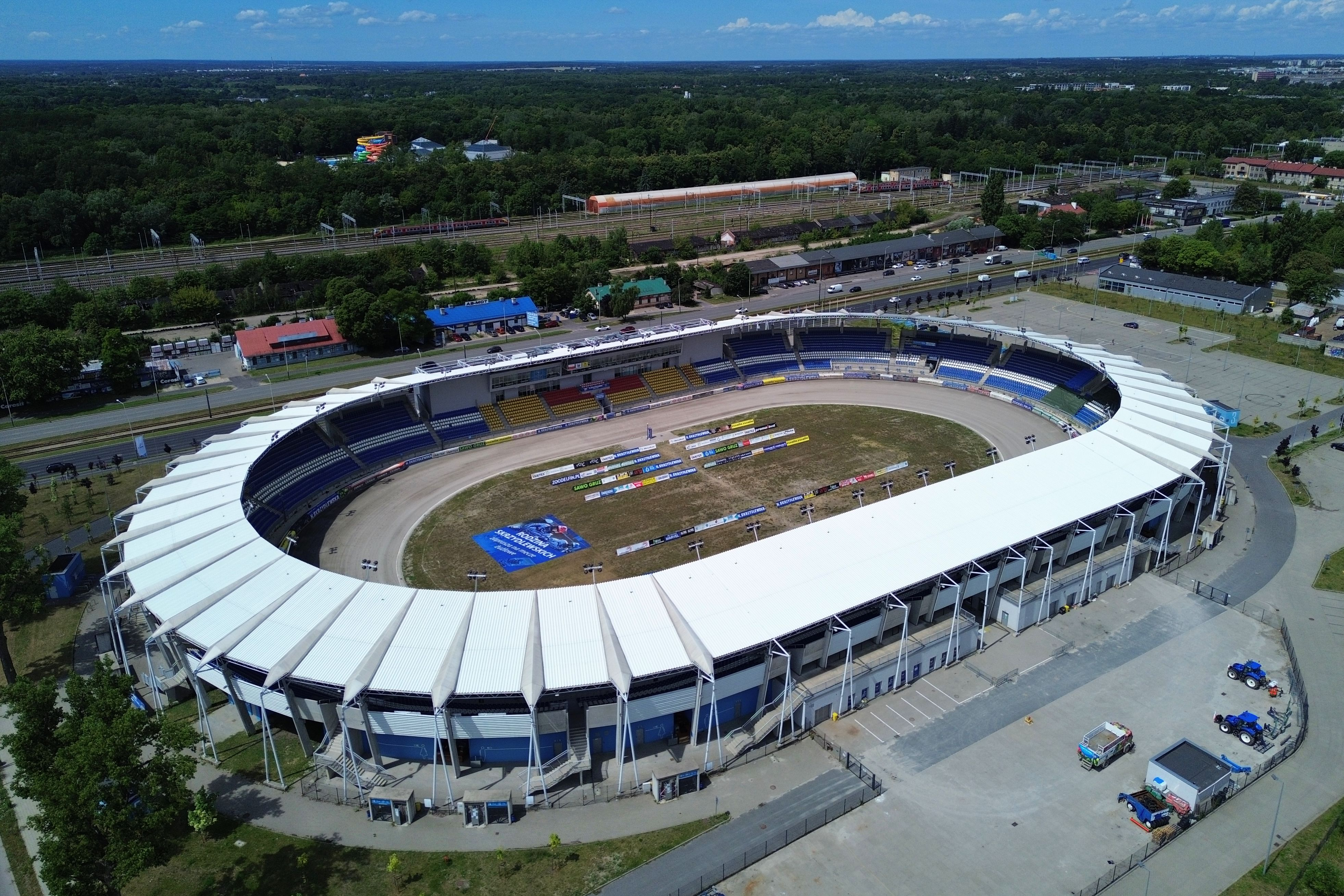
Moto Arena Łódź

The club hold their meetings at the Moto Arena Łódź, which opened in July 2018.

== History of speedway in Łódź ==
=== Tramwajarz Łódź and DKS Łódź ===
Speedway in Łódź began in 1948 with two clubs called Tramwajarz Łódź (tram drivers) and DKS Łódź. Both Tramwajarz and DKS competed in the inaugural 1948 Polish speedway season.

Three years later the club moved to Bytom and changed their name to Ogniwo, before returning a year later. In 1954, the club became Sparta before but changed again to its original name of Tramwajarz before the club disbanded in 1964.

Tadeusz Kołeczek of Ogniwo Łódź finished second in Polish Individual Speedway Championship in 1950, Włodzimierz Szwendrowski of Sparta Łódź, won the title in 1955.

=== Gwardia Łódź ===
Gwardia Łódź was formed in 1967 and ran for 14 years until 1980; they stayed in the second division and often languished in the lower half.

=== JAG Speedway Club ===
After 15 years without speedway in the city a team was formed with the name JAG or Holiday Club Łódź. They competed from 1995 to 1998.

=== ŁTŻ Łódź ===
In 1999, ŁTŻ Łódź joined the speedway league and when the Ekstraliga was introduced in 2000, ŁTŻ Łódź were in the 1. Liga. In 2001 they were relegated to the 2. Liga.

=== TŻ Łódź ===
From 2002 until 2005 Towarzystwo Żużlowe Łódź competed in the leagues.

=== Orzeł Łódź ===
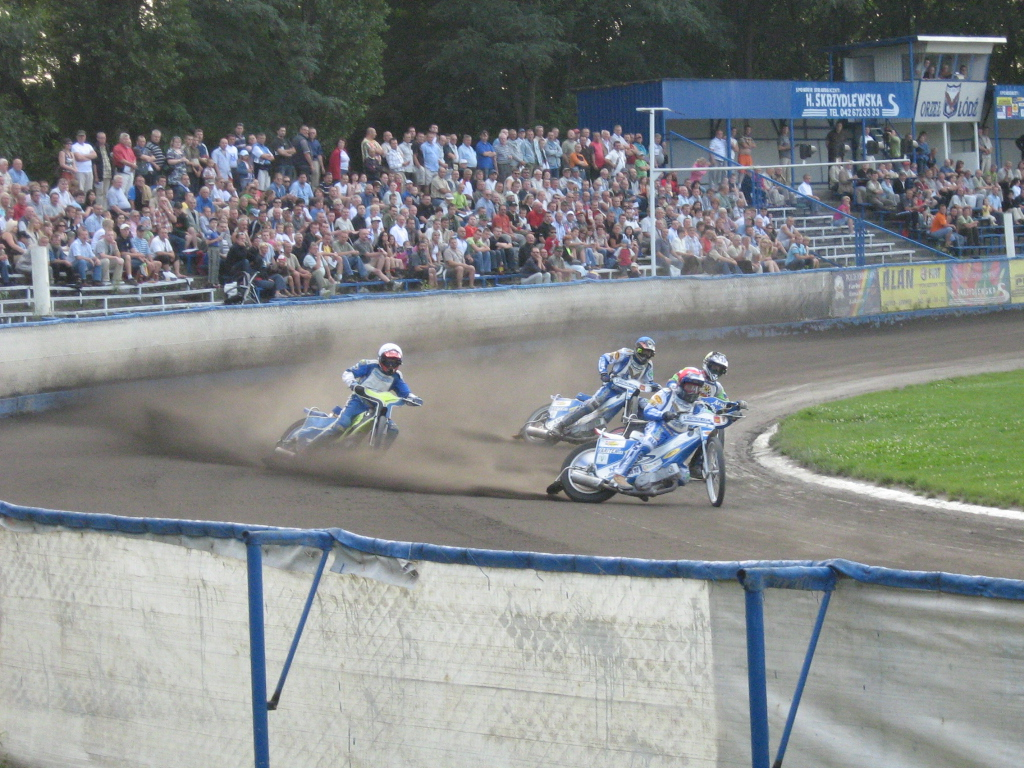
Orzeł Łódź versus AK Marketa Prague in 2007

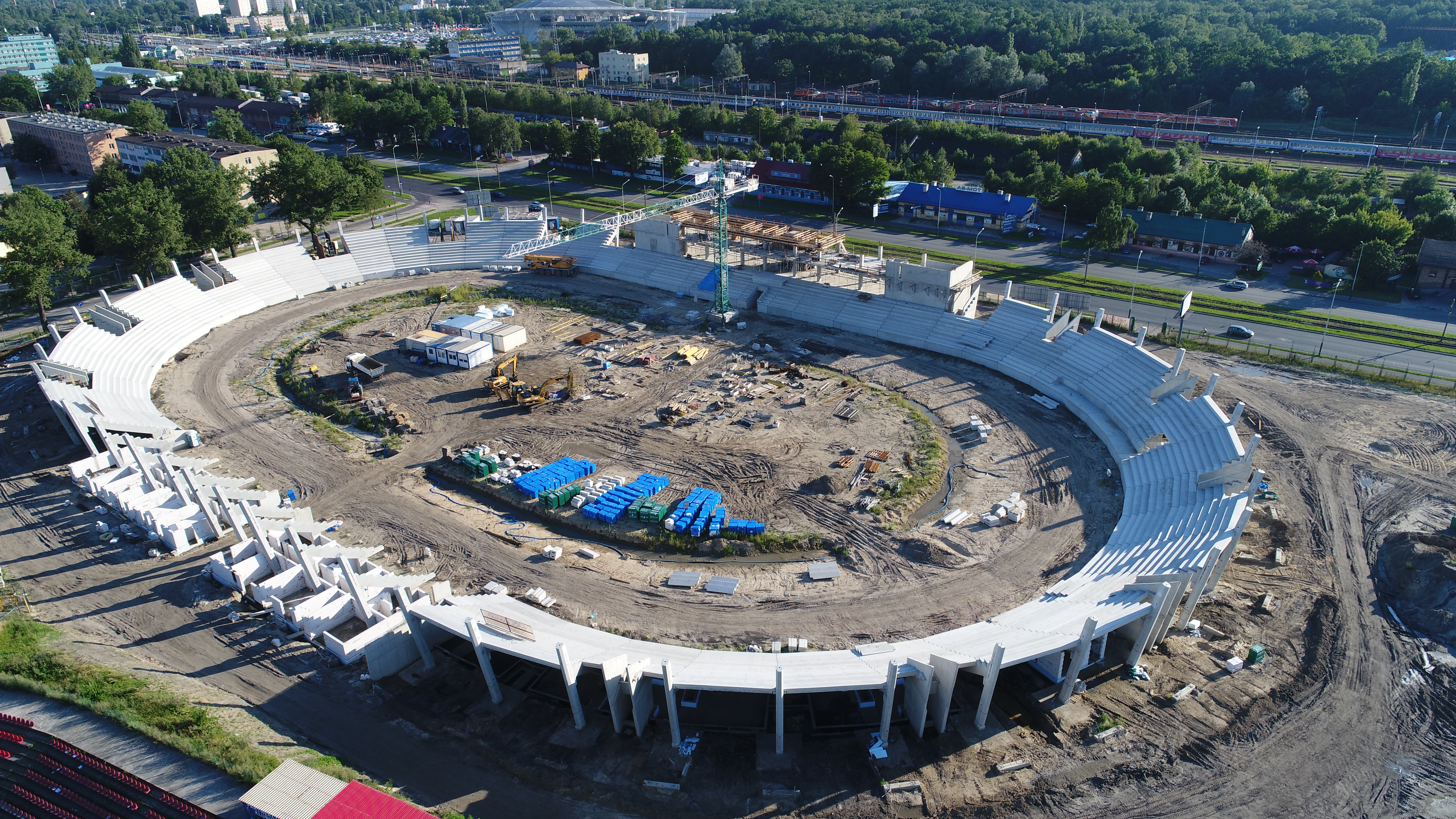
The new stadium under construction in 2017

In 2006, the Skrzydlewski family founded Orzeł Łódź. The club won the 2. Liga title in 2010.

In 2016, the team topped the 1. Liga table to complete their best season for many years. They lost in the play off final to Lokomotiv Daugavpils but the Latvian club were unable to be promoted. Orzeł declined a move to the Ekstraliga, despite winning 16 out of 18 matches that season.

In July 2018, the team moved to a new stadium called the Moto Arena Łódź.

== Previous teams ==
Extended content

2022 team

- (Australia) Brady Kurtz
- (United States) Luke Becker
- (Poland) Norbert Kościuch
- (Poland) Marcin Nowak
- (Denmark) Niels Kristian Iversen
- (Poland) Mateusz Dul
- (Poland) Nikodem Bartoch
- (Poland) Aleksander Grygolec

2023 team

- (Denmark) Niels Kristian Iversen
- (Poland) Tomasz Gapiński
- (Finland) Timo Lahti
- (Poland) Jakub Jamróg
- (Sweden) Pontus Aspgren
- (England) Tom Brennan
- (Slovenia) Nick Škorja
- (Poland) Mateusz Tonder
- (Poland) Mateusz Dul
- (Poland) Jacob Sroka
- (Poland) Aleksander Grygolec

== Notable riders ==
- (Denmark) Hans Andersen
- (Poland) Tadeusz Kołeczek
- (Poland) Włodzimierz Szwendrowski
