= Alfred Smoczyk =

Polish speedway rider

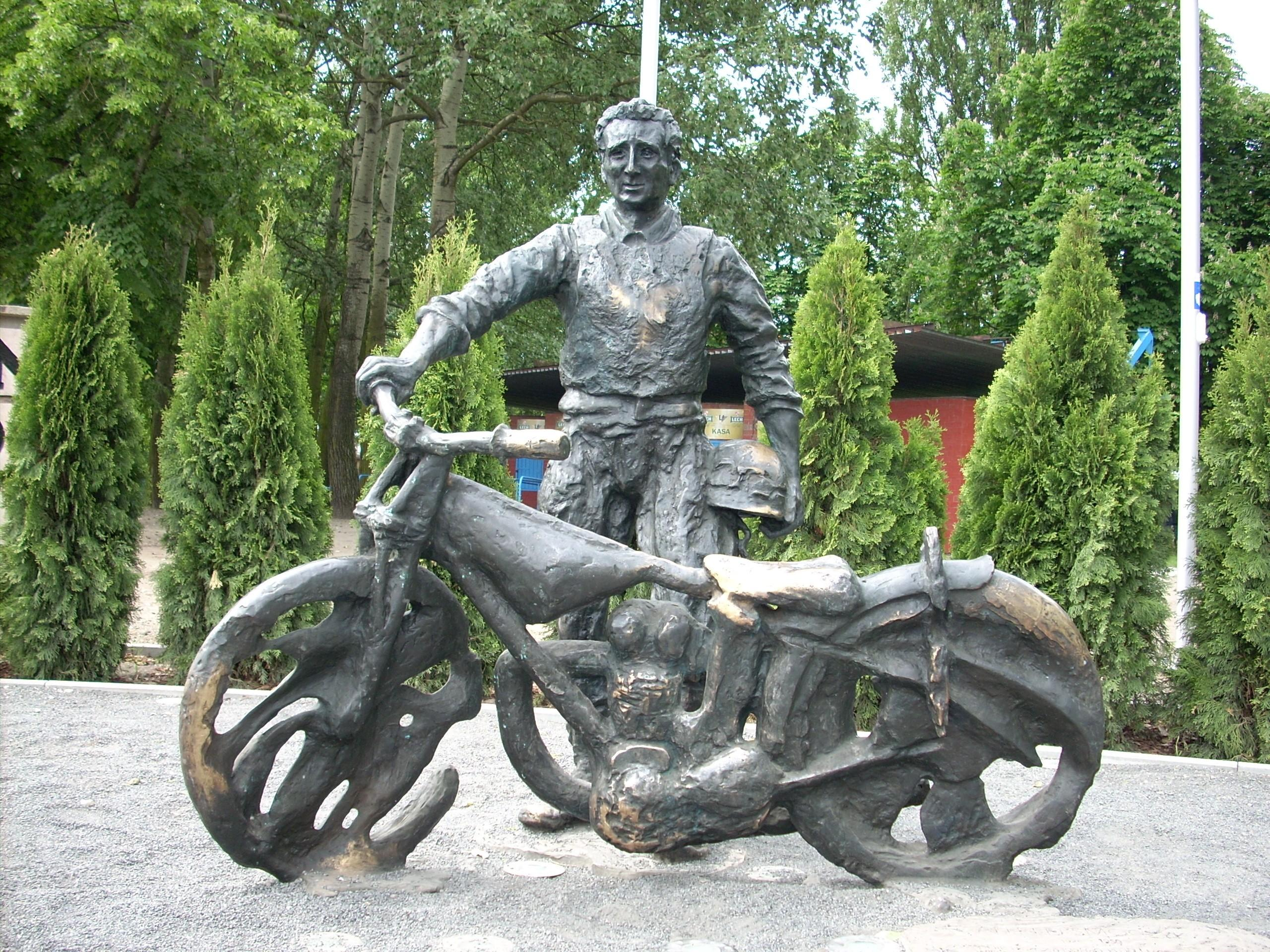
- Alfred Smoczyk Monument in Leszno
- Born: 11 October 1928; Kościan, Poland
- Died: 26 September 1950 (aged 21) near Gostyń, Poland
- Nationality: Polish

Career history
- 1948–1949: Unia Leszno
- 1950: CWKS Warszawa

Individual honours
- 1949: Polish Champion

Team honours
- 1949: Polish league Winner

Alfred Smoczyk (11 October 1928 – 26 September 1950) was an international motorcycle speedway rider from Poland.

== Speedway career ==
Smoczyk was the first champion of Poland, winning the Polish Individual Speedway Championship in 1949.

In 1950, Smoczyk was killed in a motorcycle accident in the Kąkolewski forest, near Gostyń. Later that year on 30 September, the Polish President Bolesław Bierut posthumously awarded the Officer's Cross of the Order of Polonia Restituta.

In 1951, a tournament in Leszno was named in Smoczyk's memory and in 1953 the Stadion im. Alfreda Smoczyka was named after him.

== See also ==
- List of recipients of the Order of Polonia Restituta
