= Main Commission of Speedway Sport =

Polish governing body of motorcycle speedway

The Main Commission of Speedway Sport (Polish: Główna Komisja Sportu Żużlowego, GKSŻ) is governs the sport of motorcycle speedway on behalf of the Polish Motor Union (PZM). The members are appointed by the PZM. The current chairperson of the council is Piotr Szymański.

== Members 2007-2011 ==
- Piotr Szymański - Chairperson
- Stanisław Bazela
- Dariusz Cieślak
- Ryszard Głód
- Włodzimierz Kowalski
- Maciej Polny
- Piotr Trąbski

== See also ==
- motorcycle speedway
- Speedway in Poland
