= TZ Ostrovia Ostrów Wielkopolski =

Polish motorcycle speedway team

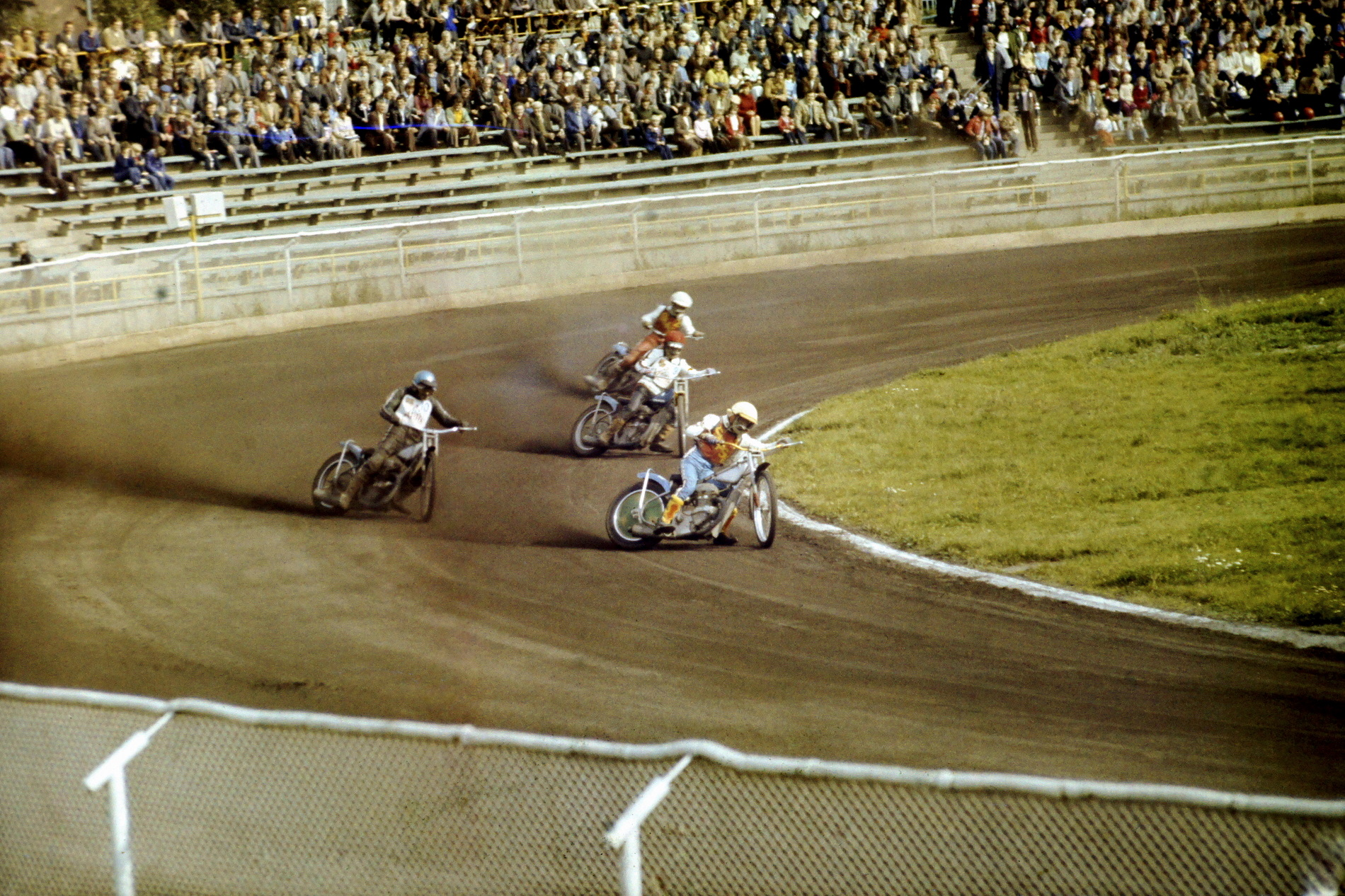
- Ostrów speedway during 1980

Club information
- Track address: Ostrów Wielkopolski Municipal Stadium, ul. Piłsudskiego 64; Ostrów Wielkopolski
- Country: Poland
- Founded: 1948
- Team manager: Tomasz Gapiński
- League: Ekstraliga 2
- Website: Official website

Club facts
- Colours: Red - White
- Nickname: Black Devils
- Track size: 372 m
- Track record time: 63.05
- Track record date: 28 June 2009
- Track record holder: Jonas Seifert-Salk

Major team honours
Team Polish Championship	1949 - silver medal
2nd division	1988, 2021
3rd division	2014

TZ Ostrovia Ostrów Wielkopolski formerly the Klub Motorowy Ostrów Wielkopolski are a Polish motorcycle speedway team based in Ostrów Wielkopolski. The team currently race in the 1. Liga.

== Stadium ==
The Ostrów Wielkopolski Municipal Stadium (Polish: Stadion Miejski w Ostrowie Wielkopolskim) is located on ulica Piłsudskiego (Piłsudski street). It contains 12,000 seats. The track is 372 metres long and has a granite surface. The track record was made by Robert Miśkowiak (63.05 sec on 28 June 2009).

== History ==
=== 1948 to 1959 ===
The club competed in the inaugural 1948 Polish speedway season, under the name of Klub Motorowy Ostrów Wielkopolski and won the silver medal the following year in 1949. In 1950, the second honour came to the club, now known as Stal Ostrów Wielkopolski, when they won the bronze medal.

In 1953, the speedway operation of Stal Ostrów Wlkp. moved to Świętochłowice but in 1955, the club now called Kolejarz-Stal Ostrów Wlkp. reappeared in the second division and continued as Ostrovia Ostrów Wlkp. until 1959, when the club disbanded again.

=== 1979 to 1999 ===
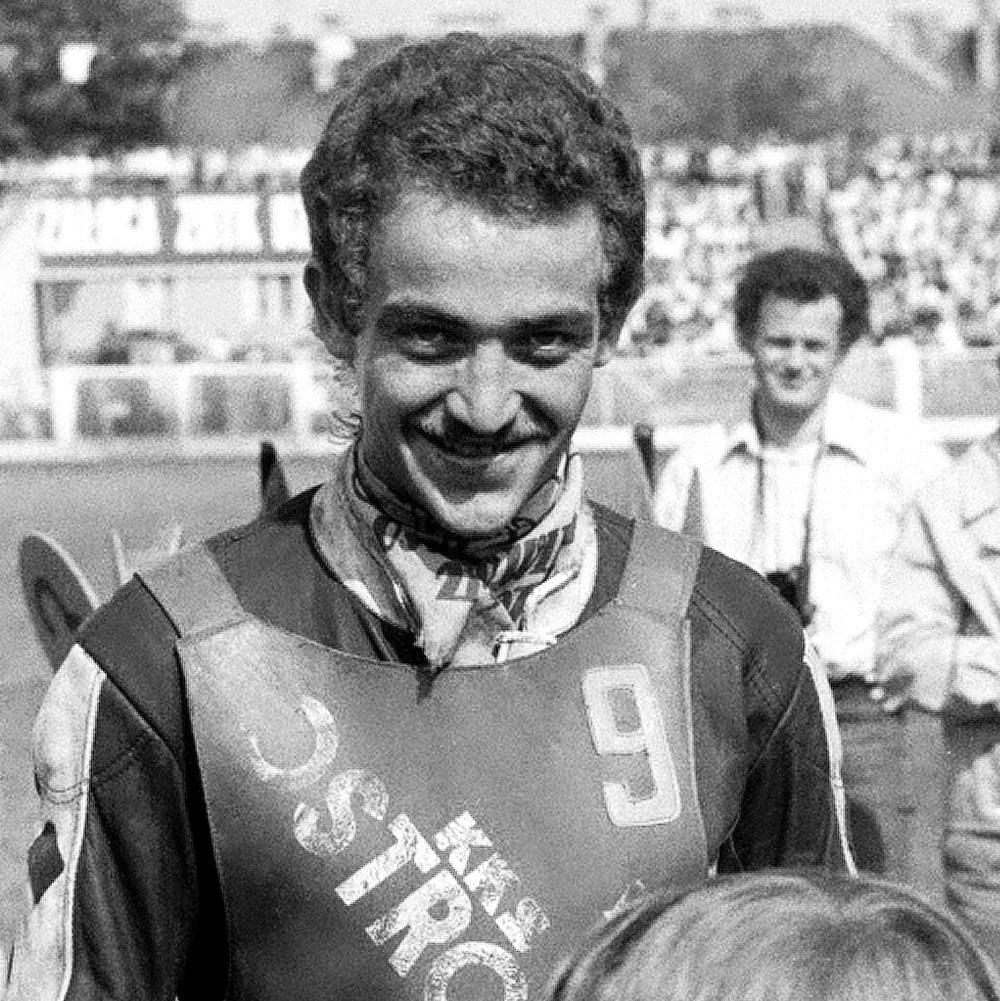
Jacek Brucheiser helped the team to promotion in 1988

Although speedway meetings took place in Ostrów in the 1969s a team did not return until the 1979 Polish speedway season, where Ostrovia Ostrów finished last in the second division. After 9 years of second division speedway the team led by Jacek Brucheiser finally won promotion by winning 2nd division in 1988. The success was short lived because they were relegated the very next season and then struggled for the next five years before failing to take their place in the 1995 league. The club gained promotion in 1997 but once again suffered relegation the following season.

=== 2000 to 2013 ===
When the Ekstraliga arrived in 2000, the club suffered a further relegation to 2. Liga. Ostrow won a promotion play off in 2003 to return to 1.Liga. The 2009 was a disaster for the club after Klub Motorowy Ostrów Wielkopolski folded and was replaced by TZ Ostrovia Ostrów Wielkopolski who finished last in 1.Liga. The club won 2. Liga in 2014 but once again problems resulted in them being unable to field a team in 2016

=== 2017 to present ===
The team returned to action in 2017 and won promotion to 1. Liga in 2019. After winning the 1.Liga in 2021 the club competed in the Ekstraliga for the first time in 2022 but were once again relegated.

== Previous teams ==
Extended content

2022 Squad

- (Poland) Tomasz Gapiński
- (Sweden) Oliver Berntzon
- (Denmark) Tim Sørensen
- (Poland) Grzegorz Walasek
- (Australia) Chris Holder
- (Sweden) Filip Hjelmland
- (Poland) Kacper Grzelak
- (Poland) Jakub Krawczyk
- (Poland) Jakub Poczta

2023 team

- (Poland) Grzegorz Walasek
- (Sweden) Oliver Berntzon
- (Denmark) Matias Nielsen
- (Poland) Tobiasz Musielak
- (Sweden) Victor Palovaara
- (Poland) Kacper Grzelak
- (Poland) Sebastian Szostak
- (Poland) Jakub Krawczyk
- (Poland) Gracjan Szostak
- (Poland) Jakub Poczta

== Notable riders ==
- (Poland) Jacek Brucheiser
- (Sweden) Peter Karlsson
- (Poland) Grzegorz Walasek

== Honours ==
Competitions	Total	Golden medals		Silver medals		Bronze medals
Competitions	Total	Total	Years	Total	Years	Total	Years
Team (DMP) (since 1948)	2			1	1949	1	1950
Team U-21 (MDMP) (since 1978)	0
Pairs (MPPK) (since 1974)	1					1	2005
Pairs U-21 (MMPPK) (1980 U-23; since 1983)	2	1	1999	1	2008
Individual (IMP) (since 1948)	0
Individual U-21 (MIMP) (since 1967)	0
Total Polish Championship medals: 5		Gold: 1		Silver: 2		Bronze: 2
Competitions	Total	I place		II place		III place
Competitions	Total	Total	Years	Total	Years	Total	Years
European Club (KPE) (since 1998)	0
Team Cup (DPP) (?)	0
Golden Helmet (ZK) (since 1961)	0
Silver Helmet U-21 (SK) (since 1966)	0
Bronze Helmet U-19 (BK) (1976-81; since 1983)	0
