= Necker =

Necker may refer to:

- Necker (surname)
- Necker (ship), several ships
- Necker (Thur), a tributary of the River Thur in Switzerland
- Neckerchief, cloth worn round the neck
- Necker cube, optical illusion
- Necker Island (Hawaii)
- Necker Island (British Virgin Islands)
- Necker–Enfants Malades Hospital

== See also ==
- Neker (disambiguation)
- Neckar (disambiguation)
- Neckertal, Switzerland, from the valley of the Necker
