= Neckar (disambiguation) =

Neckar is river in Germany.

Neckar may also refer to:

- Neckar (car), produced in Heilbronn, Germany
- Neckář, Czech surname

== See also ==
- Necker (disambiguation)
