= Necker (ship) =

Several vessels have been named Necker (or Neckar), probably for the French statesman Jacques Necker.

- Necker (1779 ship) was a French privateer operating out of Dunkirk. She made several cruises before she was herself captured early in 1781.
- Necker was a French privateer that in late 1781 or early 1782 captured Jamaica Packet after a severe engagement that lasted two hours in which Jamaica Packet suffered three men killed and two wounded. Jamaica Packet had been sailing from Quebec to Jamaica when captured and her captor sent her into Port-au-Prince.
- Necker or Neker was an armed transport that HMS Hannibal captured off the Cape of Good Hope on 25 October 1781. The British Royal Navy commissioned her as HMS Necker. She disappeared, presumed foundered, circa December 1781 on her way from Saint Helena to the East Indies.
- Necker (1789 ship) was a French whaler operating out of Dunkirk under United States masters that made four complete whaling voyages to Greenland, the coast of Brazil, and the Pacific, before a British privateer captured her in September 1793 on Necker's fifth voyage after the outbreak of war with France.
- Necker, of 360 tons ("of load"), made one voyage transporting enslaved persons from Mozambique to Port-au-Prince. She left Le Havre on 24 April 1790 for Mozambique. Between 19 February 1791 and 2 March she was at the Cape of Good Hope with 390 captives. She arrived at Port-au-Prince with 380. She arrived at Nantes on 22 July 1791. Neckar, Voltearo, master, was lost in 1792 on the Hogties as she sailed from France to Santo Domingo.
