= NSU/Fiat Weinsberg 500 =

German-built microcar based on the Fiat 500

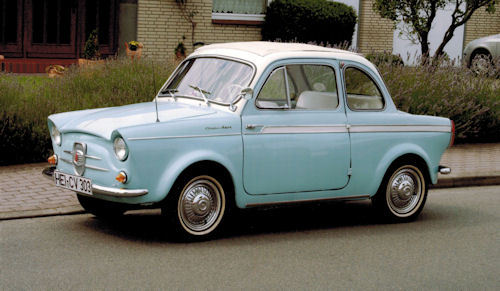
- NSU-Fiat Weinsberg Limousette (1960)

Overview
- Manufacturer: NSU-Fiat
- Production: 1959–1963 (6,228 built)
- Assembly: Heilbronn, West Germany
- Designer: Karosseriewerke Weinsberg (coachwork)

Body and chassis
- Class: Microcar
- Body style: 2-door coupé 2-door Limousette
- Layout: Rear-engine, rear-wheel-drive
- Related: Fiat Nuova 500; Neckar (car)

Powertrain
- Engine: 479 cc straight-twin
- Transmission: 4-speed manual

Dimensions
- Wheelbase: 1,840 mm (72 in)
- Length: 3,085 mm (121.5 in)
- Width: 1,350 mm (53 in)
- Height: 1,310 mm (52 in)
- Curb weight: 525 kg (1,157 lb)

The NSU/Fiat Weinsberg 500 (from 1960 the Neckar Weinsberg 500) is a microcar built in Germany by NSU-Fiat of Heilbronn between 1959 and 1963. Based on the Fiat Nuova 500, it used the Italian car's mechanicals with coachwork by Karosseriewerke Weinsberg and was offered in two versions, a Limousette and a Coupé. A total of 6,228 were produced, at a price of 3,840 DM in 1959 and 3,620 DM in 1962.

== Description ==
Two Weinsberg versions were sold at 3,840 DM (including heater and sunroof; whitewall tyres were an extra 50 DM): the Coupé and the Limousette. They differ only in the rear window design: the coupé features a wraparound panoramic rear screen, allowing only enough headroom above the rear seat for small children (up to about seven years old).

The Limousette has rear side windows and a steeper, conventional rear window like a small saloon, hence the name. This gives the Limousette a little more headroom than the coupé, but less than a Fiat 500 Nuova. Both Weinsberg models are basically two-seaters with additional space for two children or luggage. Despite having an inviting padded rear seat, it is not practical for adults. The German tyre used in the Weinsberg is a 4.40×12 size rather than the 125×12 of the normal Fiat 500, indicating that the Weinsberg was regarded as a two-seater; its load capacity was slightly less than that of the slightly wider 125×12.

In contrast to Autobianchi Bianchina, both Weinsberg versions were built from partially assembled car bodies with modifications to both front and rear panels. The front bonnet is higher, as is the wing profile, with finned rear wings and with rear lights that are unique to the Weinsberg. The cars benefited from some equipment upgrades in character with a luxury version: a sunroof instead of a folding roof, bug ornament, special bumpers, standard two-tone colour and wheel covers, ashtray in the dashboard, better upholstery fabrics and wide pockets in the doors.

The luggage space is greater, made possible by the fact that the higher bonnet allows the spare wheel to be placed on the tank. The first version's side trim was soon replaced by a contrasting-colour side stripe.

The Weinsberg's driving performance and handling characteristics match the Fiat 500. Daily production peaked at 14 cars.

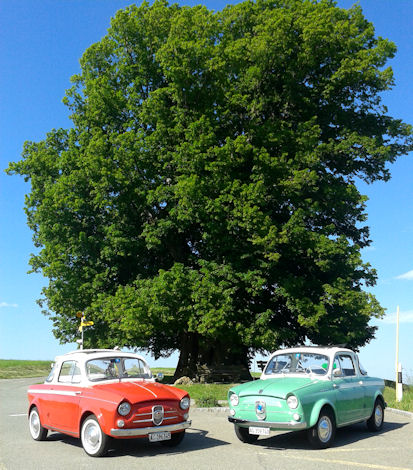
Weinsberg 500 Coupés

Other companies-built cars based on the Nuova 500, under license, such as Steyr-Puch in Austria, Simca in France, Polski Fiat in Poland and Autobianchi in Italy.

== Specifications ==
- Cylinders: 2
- Displacement: 479 cc
- Power: 15 hp at 4,250 rpm
- Maximum torque: 3.05 kg·m at 3,400 rpm
- Length/width/height: 3,085 / 1,350 / 1,310 mm
- Kerb/gross weight: 525 / 750 kg
- Maximum speed: 95 km/h
- Acceleration: 0–80 km/h in 37 seconds
- Compression ratio: 7.1
- Bore: 67.4 mm
- Stroke: 70 mm
- Fuel tank capacity: 21 litres
- Wheelbase: 1,840 mm
- Tyres: 4.40×12

All models have:

- Steel body
- Front suspension: transverse leaf spring
- Seats: 4
- Brakes: hydraulic
- Rear suspension: coil springs
- Ignition: coil
- Starter: Dynastart
- Transmission: 4-speed manual, plus reverse
- Electrical system: 12 V
