= Gutbrod Superior =

1950s German car

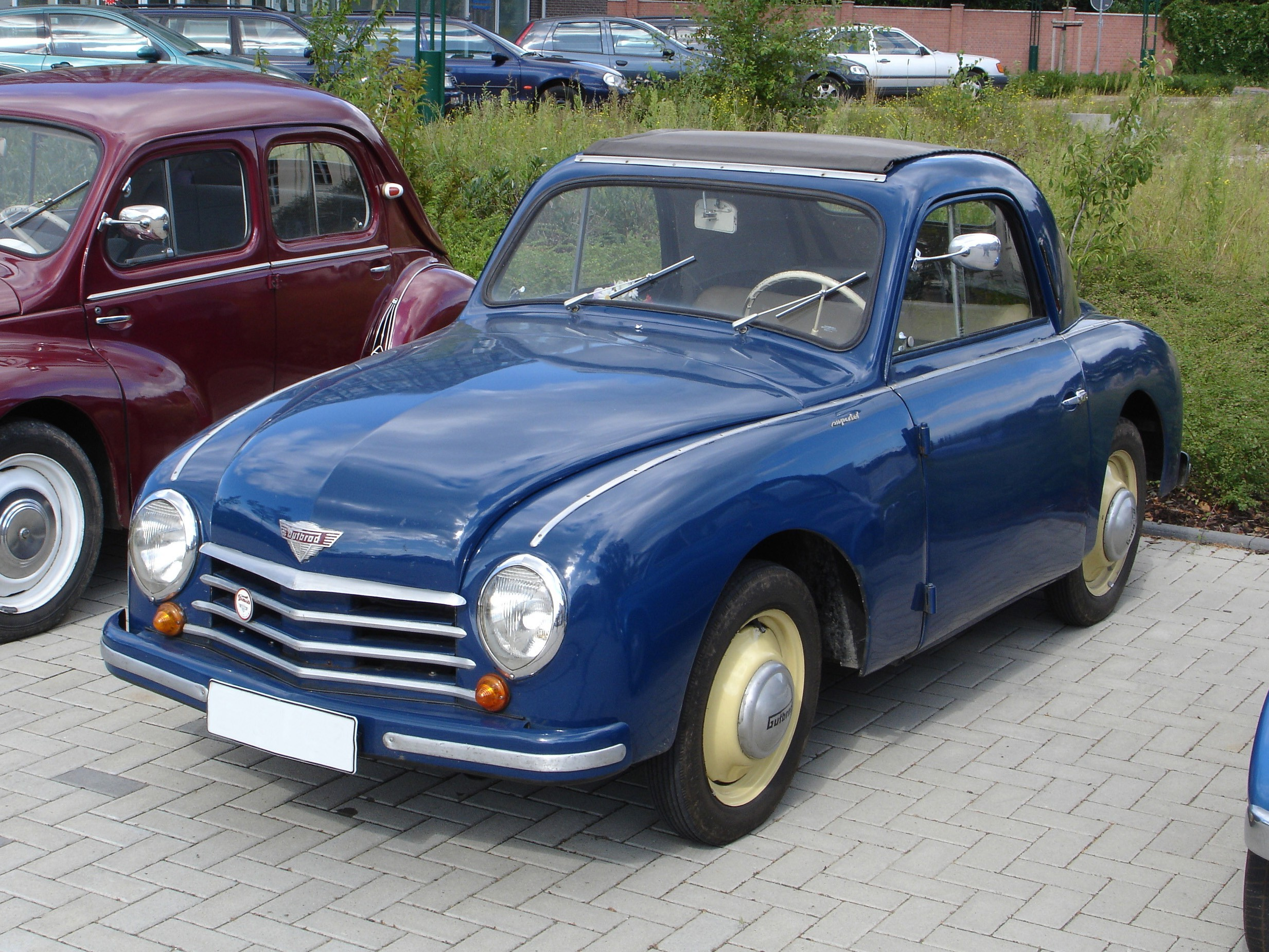
- Gutbrod Superior cabriolet saloon

Overview
- Manufacturer: Gutbrod
- Model years: 1950–1954

Body and chassis
- Class: sub compact
- Body style: saloon, cabriolet, estate

Powertrain
- Engine: 0.6–0.7 litre (15–22 kW)

Dimensions
- Wheelbase: 2,000 mm (78.7 in)
- Length: 3,560–3,600 mm (140.2–141.7 in)
- Width: 1,490 mm (58.7 in)
- Height: 1,365–1,485 mm (53.7–58.5 in)
- Kerb weight: 710 kg (1,565 lb) sedan 790 kg (1,742 lb) station wagon

Chronology
- Successor: none

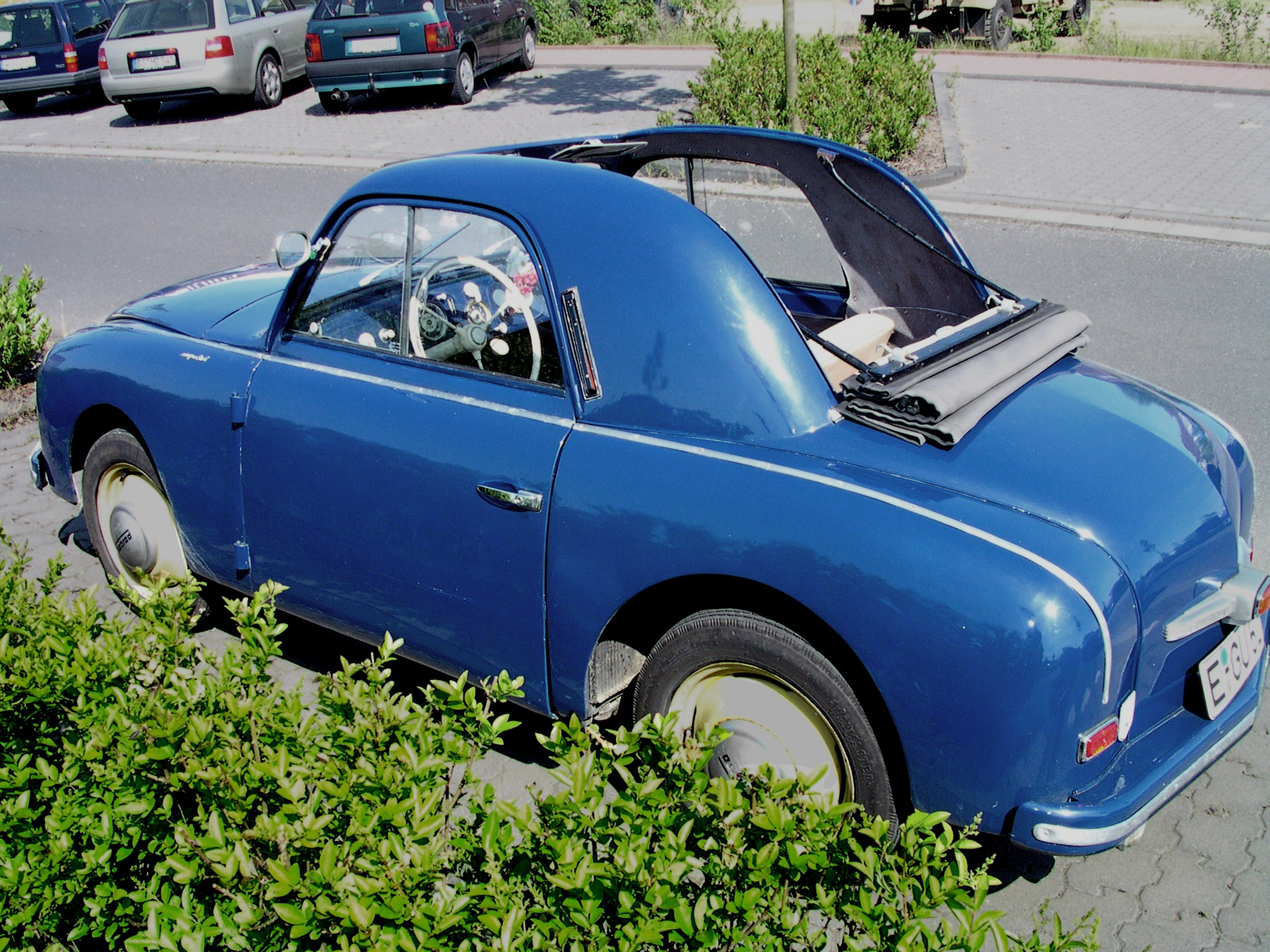
Gutbrod Superior cabriolet saloon

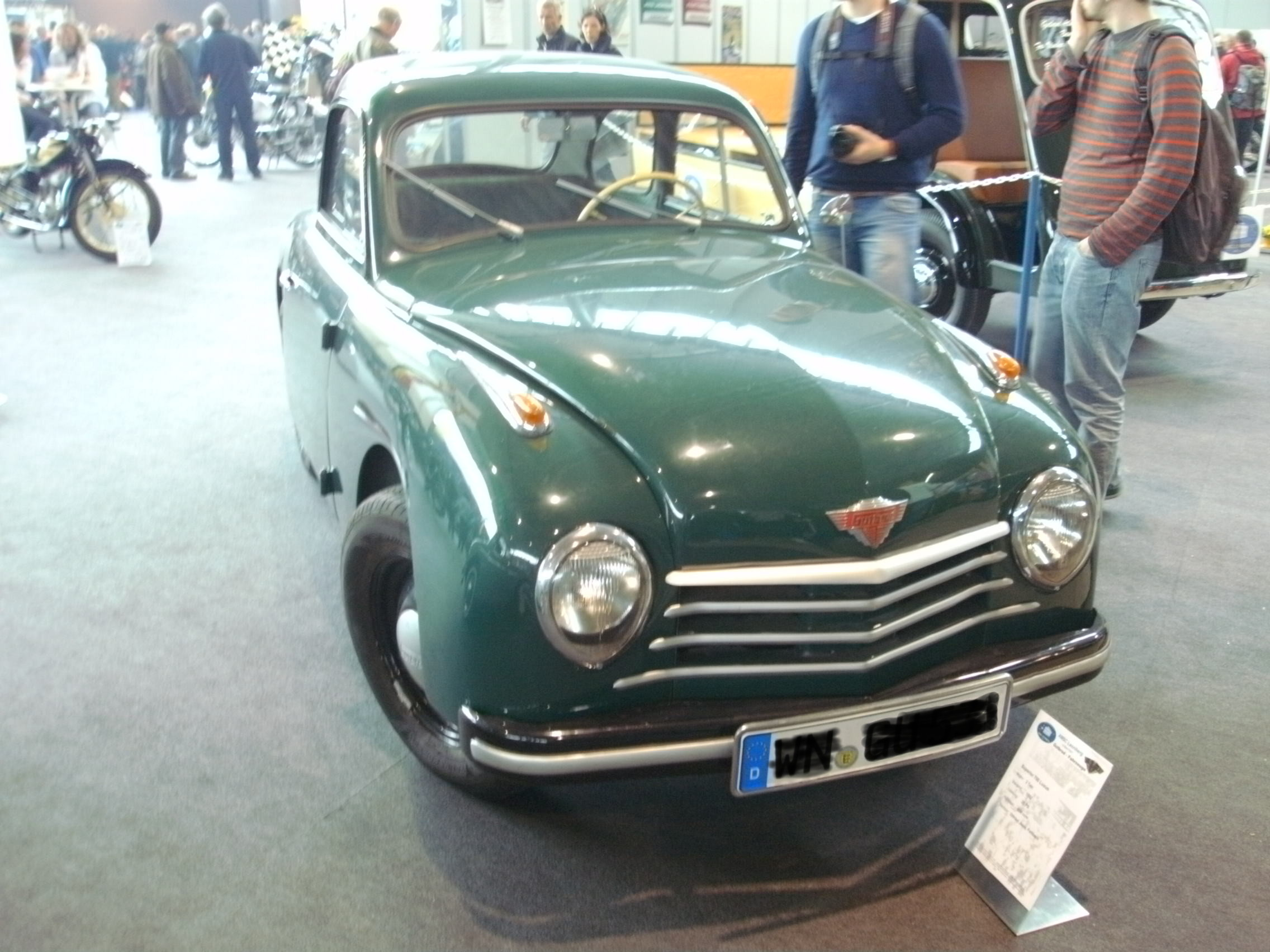
Gutbrod Superior saloon

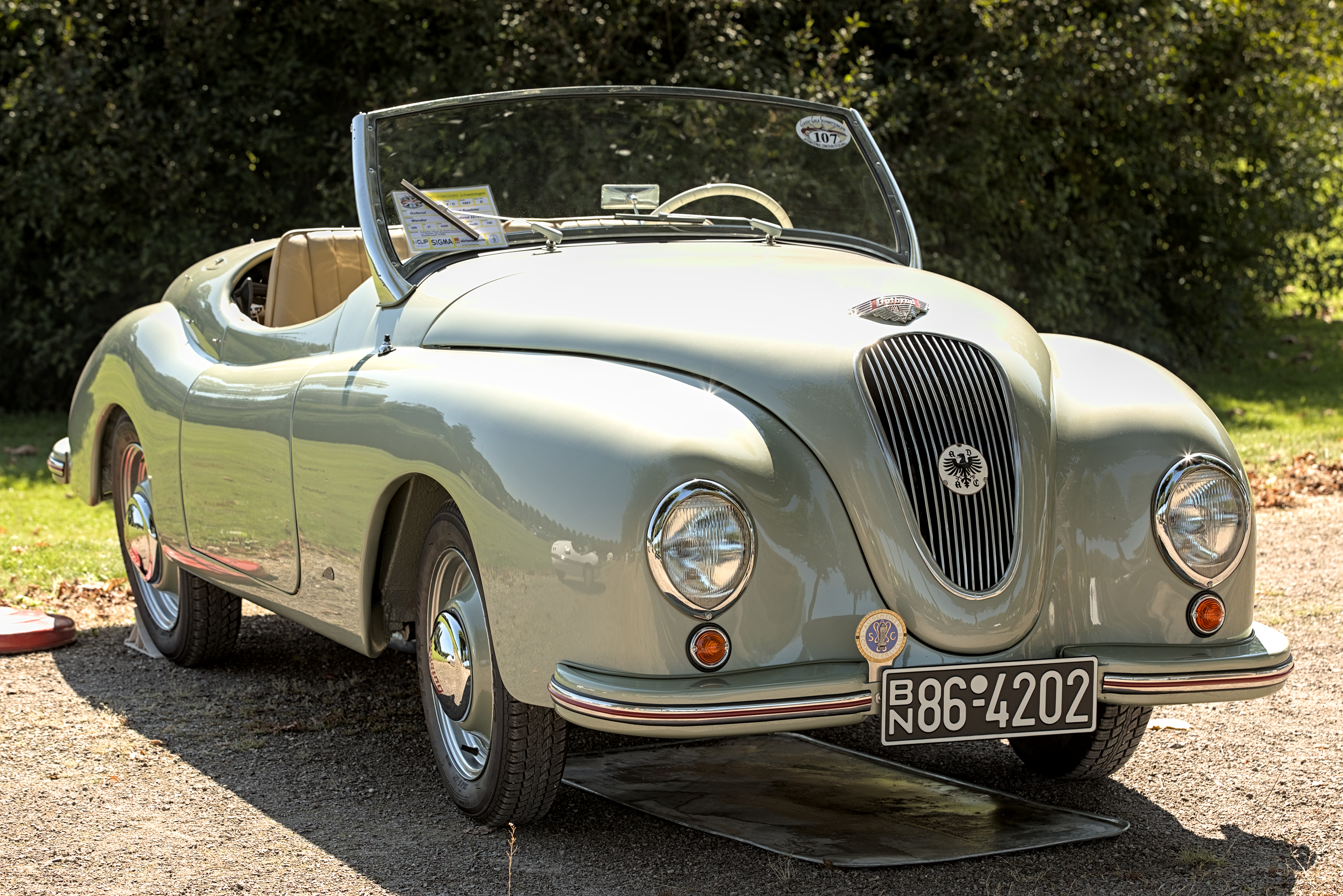
1952 Wendler body Gutbrod Superior Sport Roadster

The Gutbrod Superior is a small car, built from 1950 until 1954 by German manufacturer Gutbrod. A total of 6,860 cabriolet saloons and 866 estates were built in less than four years.

== History ==
In November 1949, a pilot series of the cabriolet saloon Superior 600 was built in Plochingen, and in July 1950, the regular series production began at the Calw division. The standard model was offered until April 1954. At the 1950 Frankfurt Spring Fair, the cabriolet was presented; the public, however, did not show much interest. The "Superior-Sport", an expensive roadster with a Wendler body, was also less successful, despite being offered at a price of less than DM 8000. In 1951/52, only twelve units were built. Only two prototypes of a four-seater saloon that had been announced for 1954 have been built. In April 1954, the production of Gutbrod cars discontinued due running out of funds. The Calw and Plochingen divisions were sold to Bauknecht.

Managed by Hans Scherenberg, Gutbrod cooperated with Robert Bosch GmbH and developed a mechanical petrol direct injection. At the same time, a similar system was also used by Goliath. Both manufacturers showed their direct-injected models at the 1951 International Motor Show Germany (IAA Frankfurt). They are considered the world's first mass-produced vehicles with petrol direct injection. The production of the Superior 700 E started in September 1951.

== Technical description ==
=== Body and chassis ===
The ponton body of the small notchback cabriolet saloon was mounted on a forward forked central tube frame. It had two seats, and initially two suicide doors. Starting from 1951, the doors were hinged at the front and carpeted. In the Superior's first version, the boot was only accessible from inside; later, it received a lid. In 1952, the estate was presented.

Whilst the bodies for the cabriolet saloons were made by Karosseriewerke Weinsberg, bodies for the estates were made by Westfalia.

The vehicle has independent suspension, the front wheels were equipped with double control arms, coil springs and telescopic shock absorbers, in rear it had a pendulum axle, also equipped with coil springs and telescopic shock absorbers. Experiments with front transverse leaf springs had not led to a satisfying result. Hydraulically operated drum brakes on all wheels were standard.

=== Engine and transmission ===
The model 600 had a longitudinally mounted, water-cooled two-cylinder two-stroke engine in front. It displaced 593 cm^{3} (bore × stroke = 71 mm × 75 mm) and was rated 20 to 22 PS (15 to 16 kW) at 3250 rpm. The model 600 Luxus had a more luxurious interior. In 1952, the 700 Luxus followed with 663 cm^{3} engine (75 mm bore × 75 mm stroke) and 26 PS (19 kW) at 4300 rpm. As an alternative to this carburetted engine, Gutbrod offered an engine with petrol direct injector. This engine was rated 30 PS (22 kW) at same speed. All models had a single-disc dry clutch, a nonsynchronised three-speed gearbox, and front-wheel drive. In 1953, vehicles with 700 cm^{3} engines were fitted with gearboxes that had synchromesh on the second and third gears only.

The model 600 had an average fuel consumption of 7.5 l/100 km (38 mpg Imp.), and reached a top speed of 100 km/h (62 mph). The 700 Luxus fuel consumption was 7.5 L/100 km in its carburetted version, and 7.0 L/100 km (40 mpg Imp.) in its direct-injection version, which, unlike the carburetted version, had a dedicated autolube system. The modell 700 Luxus cabriolet saloons had a top speed of 110 km/h (68 mph) with the carburetted engine, and 115 km/h with the direct-injected engine. The estates reached top speeds of 100 km/h and 105 km/h (62 and 65 mph) respectively.

== Motorsport ==
The popularity of the Gutbrod Superior was supported by its contributions to motorsport. The car was especially successful in long-distance competitions. In 1953, at the first 6 Hours of Nürburgring, a 1000 km race initiated by the ADAC on the Nürburgring, two Gutbrod Superiors participated. Both cars lasted and were the last to finish in places 26 and 27 with 37 of 44 laps finished. In total, they covered 843.6 km each, with times of 10:34:23 and 10:35:23 respectively. This race proved the cars' reliability. The average speeds were 79.8 and 79.7 km/h respectively. During the 48-hour winter drive to Oberstdorf in 1954, Wolfgang Gutbrod and Heinz Schwind driving Gutbrod Superiors scored second in all categories. They were awarded with the ADAC silver cup and a gold medal.

== Bibliography ==
- Werner Oswald: Deutsche Autos 1945–1990 – Audi, BMW, Mercedes, Porsche und andere. Band 4, 1. Auflage. Motorbuch Verlag, Stuttgart 2001, ISBN 3-613-02131-5, p. 478–480. (in German)
- Hanns Peter Rosellen: Deutsche Kleinwagen nach 1945 – geliebt, gelobt und unvergessen. Lizenzausgabe für Weltbild Verlag, Augsburg 1991, ISBN 3-89350-040-5, p. 296–321. (in German)
