= Fiat 1100 =

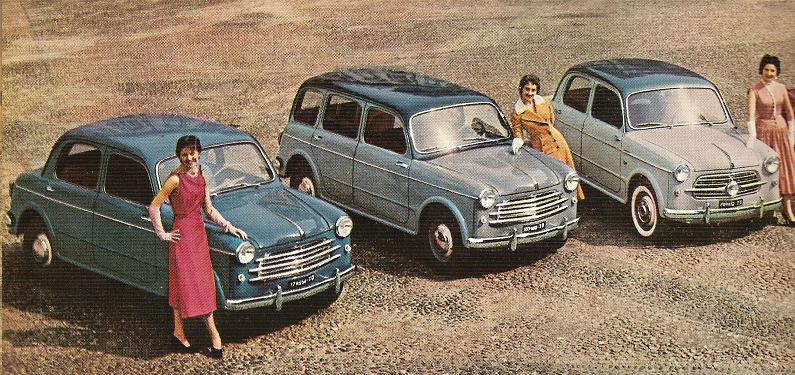
- Various versions of the 1100/103 (spring 1955). From right to left: Berlina (sedan), Familiare (estate), TV (Turismo Veloce).

Overview
- Manufacturer: Fiat
- Production: 1953–1969 (Europe) until 2000 (India)

Body and chassis
- Class: Small family car (C)
- Body style: 4-door saloon; 4-door estate; 2-door spider
- Layout: Front-engine, rear-wheel-drive
- Related: Neckar Europa; Premier Padmini (1100 D)

Chronology
- Predecessor: Fiat 1100 E
- Successor: Fiat 128

The Fiat 1100 is a small family car produced from 1953 until 1969 by the Italian manufacturer Fiat. It was an all-new unibody replacement for the Fiat 1100 E, which descended from the pre-war, body-on-frame Fiat 508 C Balilla 1100. The 1100 was changed steadily and gradually until being replaced by the new Fiat 128 in 1969. There were also a series of light commercial versions of the 1100 built, with later models called the Fiat 1100T, which remained in production until 1971. The Fiat 1100 D also found a long life in India, where Premier Automobiles continued to build the car until the end of 2000.

== Background ==
Like other manufacturers, after World War II Fiat continued producing and updating pre-war types. The first clean-sheet design was the 1950 1400, the first Fiat with unibody construction, which replaced the 1935 1500. Fiat's intermediate offering between the 1500 and the diminutive 500 was the 1100 E, the last evolution of the 508C Nuova Balilla 1100, first launched in 1937. Its replacement was codenamed Tipo 103; like the 1400 was to use unibody construction, with the 1100 E's 1.1-litre engine carried over unaltered.

== 1100 ==
Fiat 1100
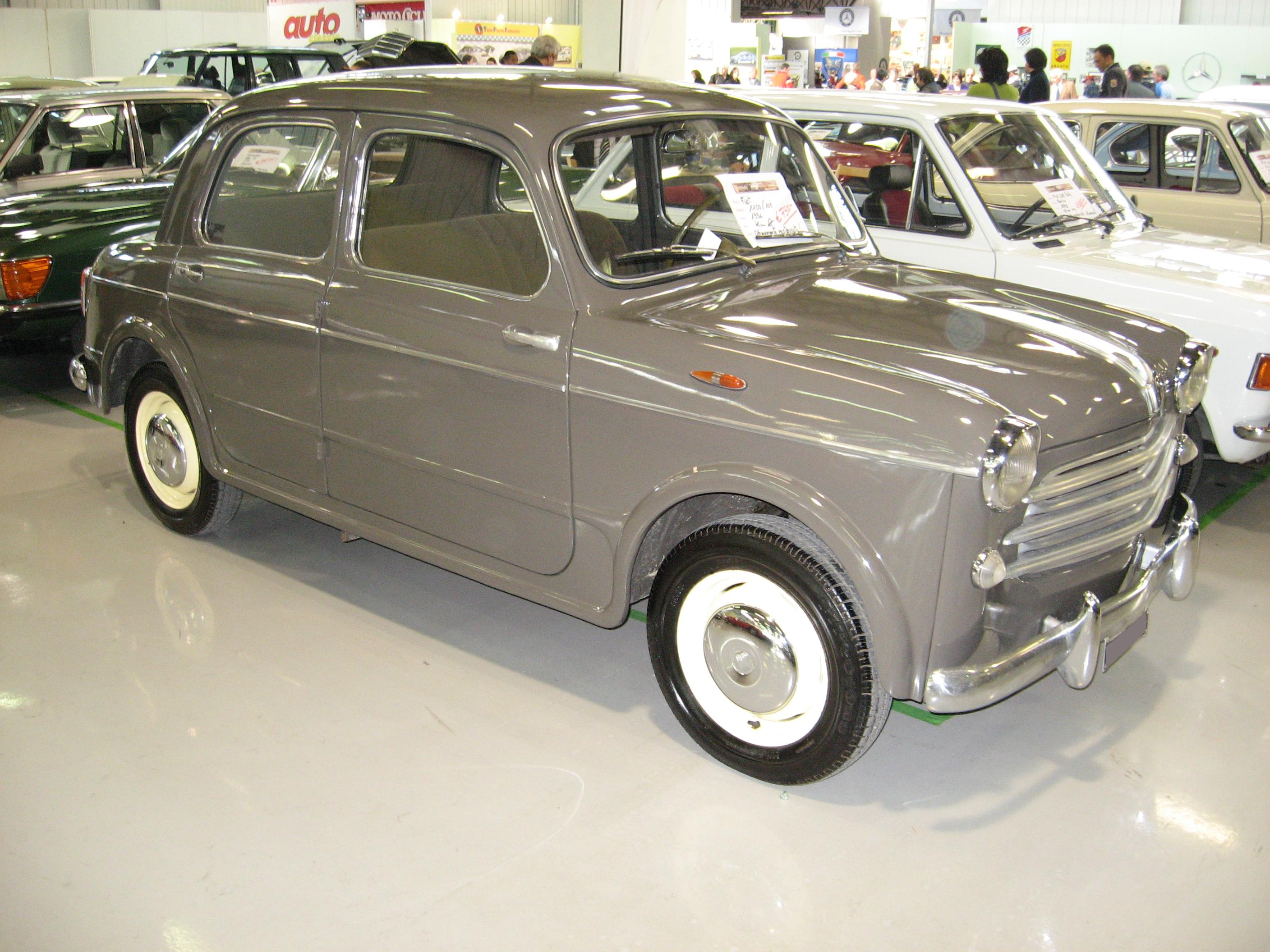
- The original 1100/103 Berlina (sedan)

Overview
- Manufacturer: Fiat
- Also called: NSU-Fiat Europa; NSU-Fiat Neckar; Zastava 1100B
- Production: 1953–1962
- Assembly: Italy: Mirafiori, Turin; Argentina: Córdoba; Australia; Egypt: Cairo (El Nasr); India: Mumbai; Yugoslavia: Kragujevac; West Germany: Heilbronn (NSU Automobil AG)

Body and chassis
- Body style: 4-door saloon; 4-door estate; 2-door spider
- Layout: Front-engine, rear-wheel-drive
- Related: Fiat 1200; Neckar Europa

Powertrain
- Engine: 1,089 cc I4 (petrol); 1,221 cc I4 (petrol)
- Transmission: 4-speed manual

Dimensions
- Wheelbase: 2,342 mm (92.2 in)
- Length: 103 E: 3,775 mm (148.6 in); 103 E Familiare: 3,745 mm (147.4 in)
- Width: 103 E: 1,458 mm (57.4 in); 103 E Familiare: 1,436 mm (56.5 in)
- Height: 103 E: 1,480 mm (58.3 in)
- Curb weight: 103 E: 828–846 kg (1,825–1,865 lb)

=== 1953: 1100/103 ===
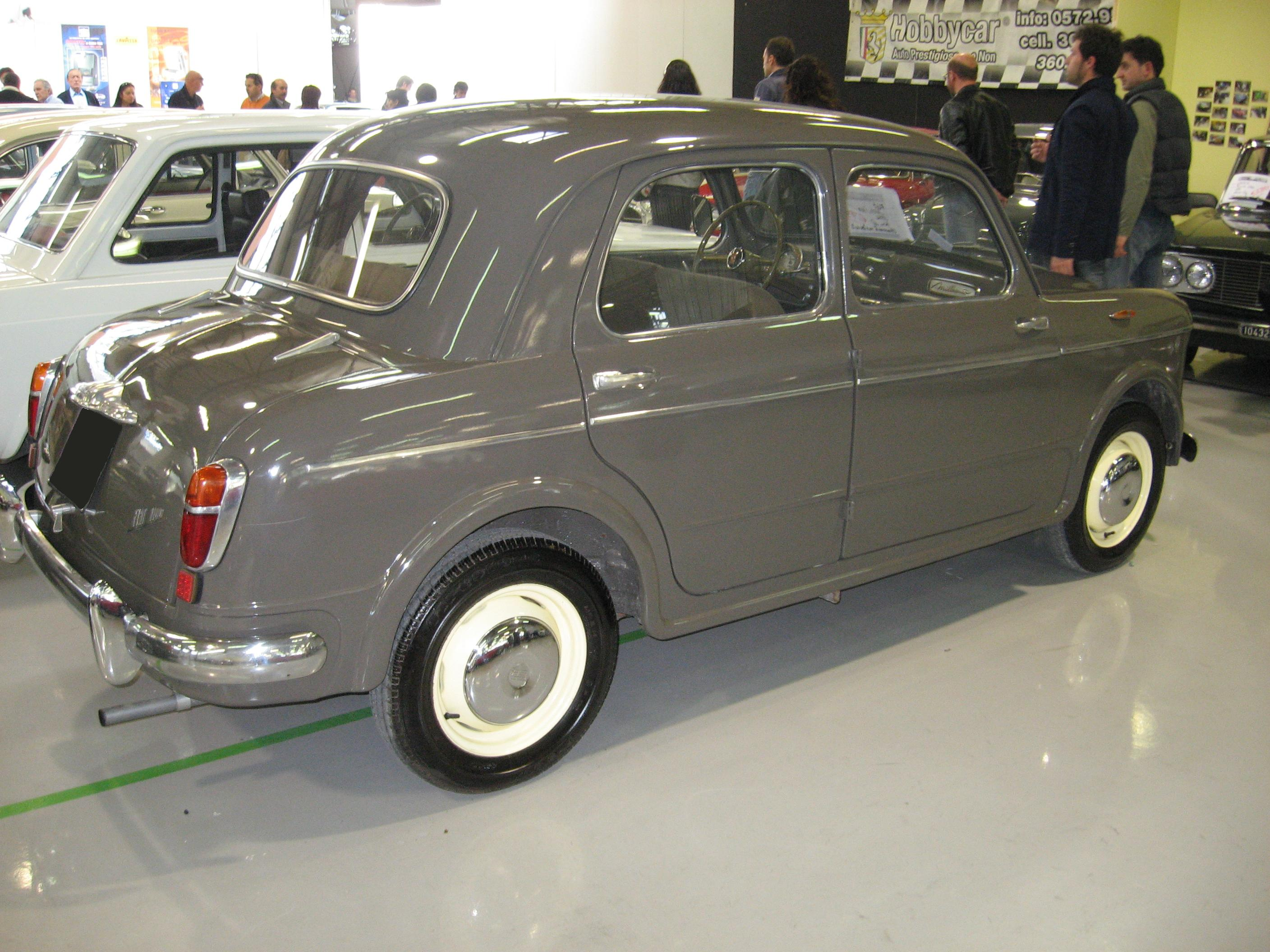
The original 1100/103

The Fiat Nuova 1100, or Fiat 1100/103 as it was called after its internal project number, was introduced at the April 1953 Geneva Motor Show. Unlike the 1100 E it replaced, the 103 had a modern four-door saloon pontoon body topping new unibody construction, both pioneered in Fiat's range by the 1950 1400.

If the 103's body was all-new, its engine was well-tested; the car's engine debuted in 1937 on the predecessor of the outgoing 1100 E, the 508 C Balilla 1100. Updated as type 103.000, the 1,089 cc (66 cu in) overhead valve four-cylinder was fed by a single Solex or Weber downdraught carburettor, and put out 36 PS CUNA (26 kW) at 4,400 rpm—just one horsepower more than on the 1100 E. The 4-speed manual transmission had synchromesh on the top three speeds and a column-mounted shifter, fashionable at the time. The car could reach a top speed of 116 km/h (72 mph). The new model was offered in two different versions: the spartan Tipo A and richer Tipo B. The former was only available in a grey-brown paint colour, had separate front seats instead of a bench, reduced, non-chromed exterior trim, and lacked a heater and ventilation. The Type A right hand drive export models were only available in black. They were also equipped with a heater and ventilation system as well. The Type A cars also came with slightly broader body trim strips compared to the Type B. On left hand drive versions of both the Type A and Type B cars, the dashboard contained a large plastic badge (on the right hand side) stating "Millecento" covering the orifice where a radio could be installed. However on the right hand drive cars, this badge which was located on the left hand side contained the wording Fiat 1100 on the Type A cars and Millecento on the Type B cars. The type B came in a choice of paint hues and interior fabrics, and could be ordered with factory-fitted whitewall tyres and radio. A distinguishing feature of 103s throughout the 1950s were the doors, both hinged on the centre pillar; this would only change in 1960, when the 1100 started to adopt the more modern bodyshell of the Fiat 1200 Granluce saloon. Unlike the earlier, body-on-frame 1100 series, there was no NSU-developed two-door sedan model.

==== 1100 TV ====
At the October 1953 Paris Motor Show, Fiat launched a sporting version of the 103, the 1100 TV—standing for Turismo Veloce, "Fast Touring". The TV was fitted with an improved engine (type 103.006), which developed 48 PS CUNA (35 kW) at 5,400 rpm rather than the 36 PS (26 kW) of the regular versions, mainly thanks to a twin-choke Weber carburettor and a higher 7.4:1 (instead of 6.7:1) compression ratio. Later in 1954, compression ratio was raised further to 7.6:1 and power reached 50 PS CUNA. Top speed was 135 km/h (84 mph). Another notable mechanical difference was the propeller shaft, two-piece instead of one-piece in order to dampen torsional vibrations, intensified by the increased engine output.

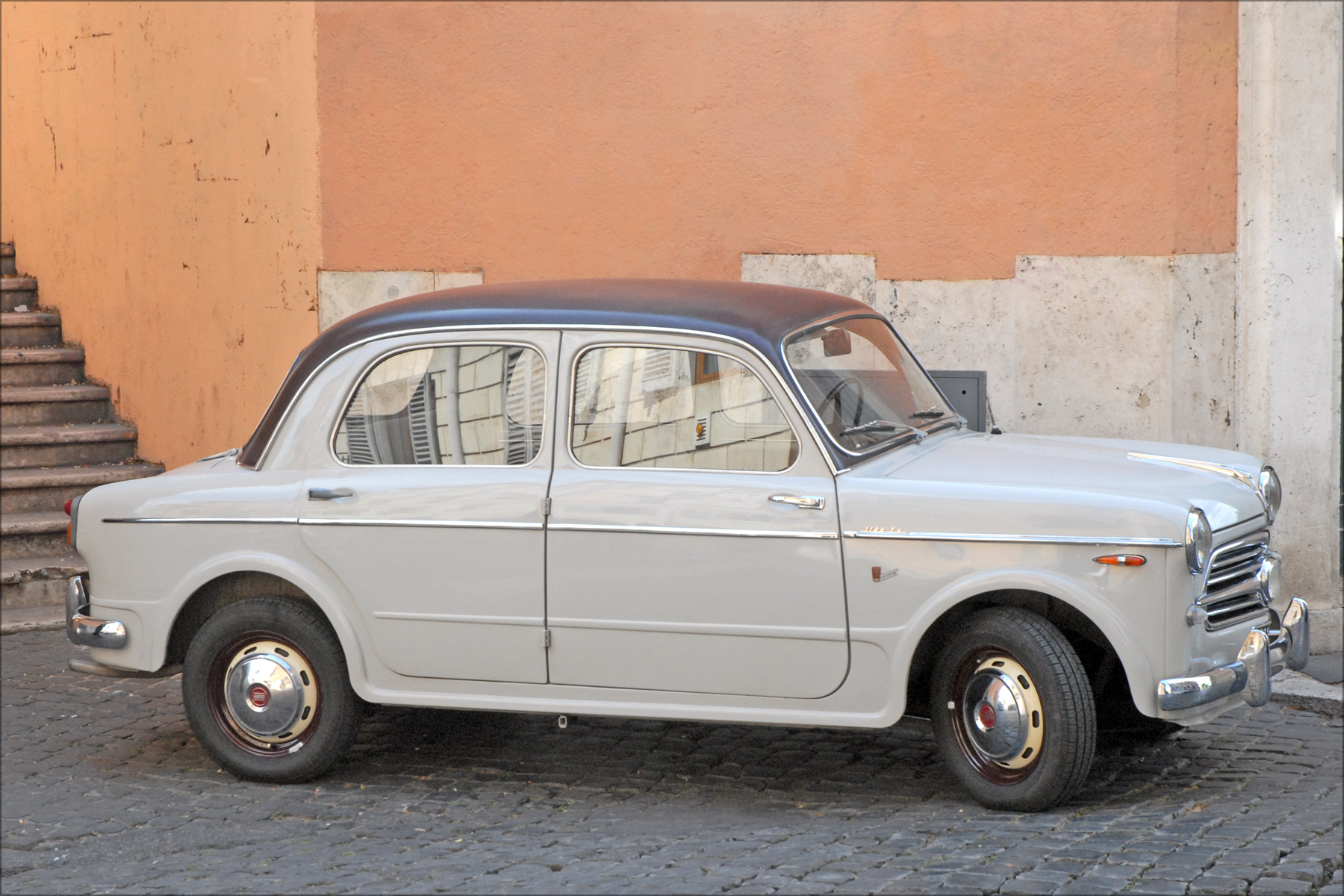
Top-of-the-line: 1100/103 TV

The TV's bodyshell, outfitted by Fiat's Carrozzerie Speciali special bodies department, differed from the standard in having a larger, curved rear window and prominent rear wings, supporting differently shaped tail lamps. A distinguishing trait of the TV was a single front fog lamp, inset in the grille and flanked by two chrome whiskers. Specific exterior trim included thicker chrome spears on the sides with "1100 TV" and "Fiat Carrozzerie Speciali" badging, a taller bonnet ornament, special hubcaps, and whitewall tyres. As standard the TV was painted in a two-tone livery, with the roof and wheel rims in a contrasting colour. Inside it featured a tortoiseshell celluloid two-spoke steering wheel, two-tone cloth and vinyl upholstery, colour-coded fully carpeted floor, and until the end of 1954 reclining buckets which could optionally be fitted instead of the standard bench seat. At 1,225,000 Italian lire (1953 price) the 1100 TV was markedly more expensive than the standard Tipo A and B saloons, priced respectively 945 and 975 thousand lire.

The TV was appreciated by Fiat's more sporting clientele, who entered it in numerous races in period; its most prestigious victories include class wins at the 1954 and 1955 Mille Miglia, and an outright win at the 1954 Cape Town to Algiers trans African rally.

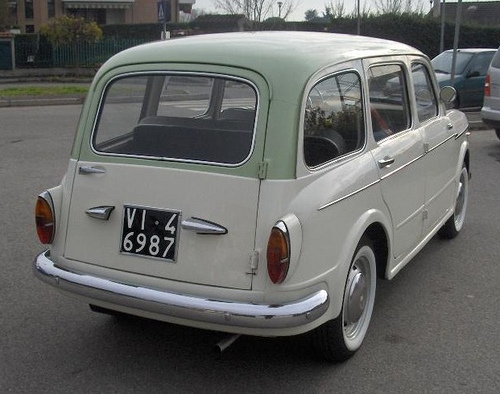
1100 Familiare, here a 1958 model

==== 1100 Familiare ====
A new 1100 body style was introduced at the 1954 Geneva Motor Show, a five-door estate named 1100 Familiare on its home market. Abroad, it was alternatively known as the 1100 Family, 1100 Familiale, 1100 Kombiwagen, or 1100 Familiar in English-, French- German-, and Spanish-speaking markets respectively. The rear door was side-hinged, and the vinyl-covered rear bench could be folded down to form a flat loading surface, able to carry a load of 300 kg (661 lb). A third row of two forward-facing jump seats allowed to carry a fifth and sixth passenger, folding level with the boot floor when not in use. From a mechanical standpoint, aside from taller tyres, the Familiare was identical to the standard saloon.

==== 1100 TV Trasformabile ====
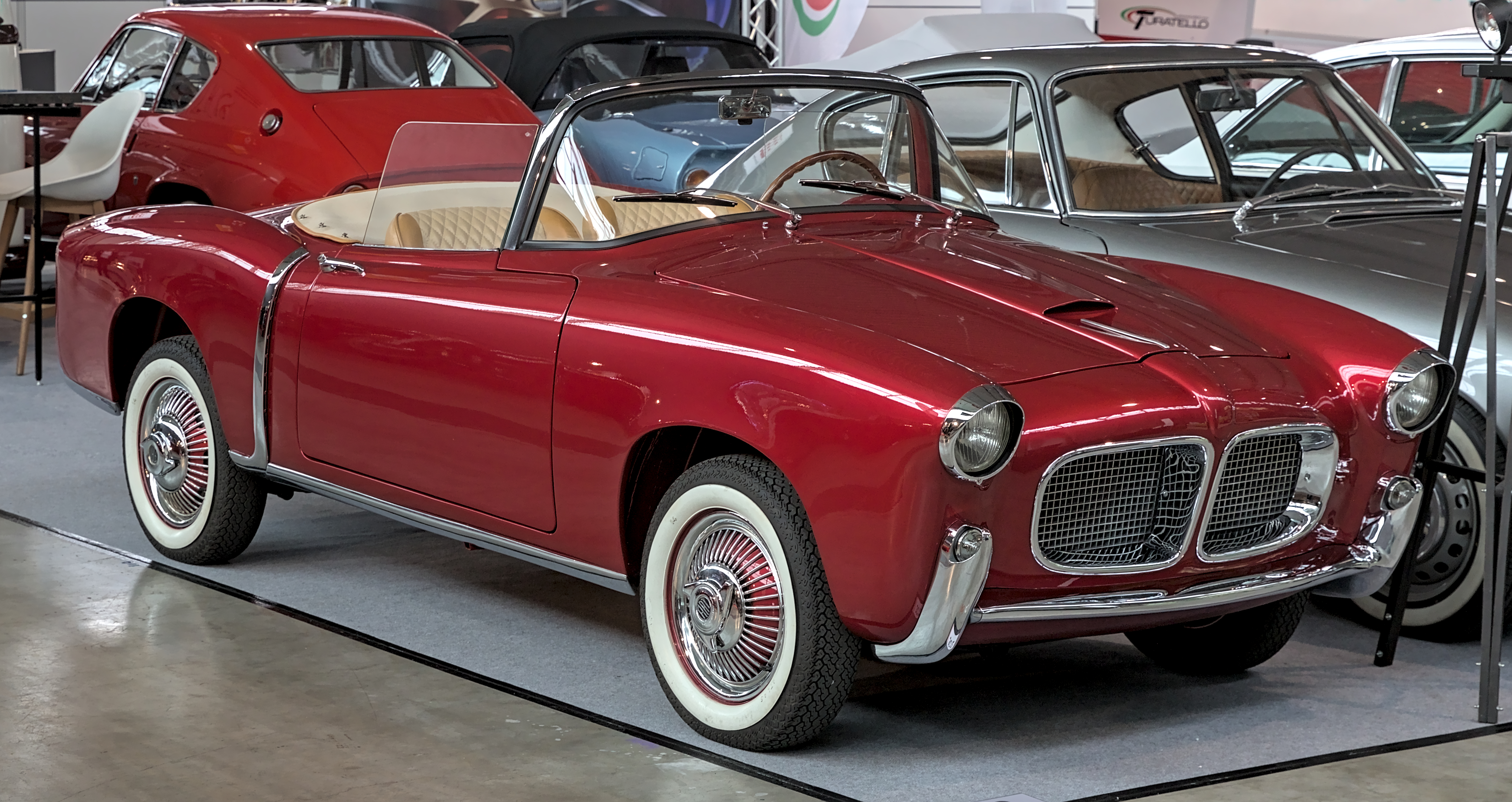
Fiat 1100 TV Trasformabile

The 1100/103 TV Trasformabile, a two-seater roadster, was introduced in March 1955 at the Geneva Motor Show. As its name implied, it was based on mechanicals from the 1100 TV. Like the Turismo Veloce saloon, the American-inspired design of the Trasformabile was the work of Dipartimento Carrozzerie Derivate e Speciali, the special bodies department of Fiat, rather than of a third-party coachbuilder; it was penned by the department's head, engineer and designer Fabio Luigi Rapi. 571 of these first series Trasformabiles were built. In 1956 it received a more powerful engine (three more horsepower) and a modified rear suspension; 450 more of these were built.

During 1957, a transitory model of the 1100TV Trasformabile was produced, featuring updated exterior styling but with an identical interior, for a short period before the introduction of the 1200 Trasformabile. These transition period cars are exceptionally rare, and were primarily destined for export markets. When the 1200 Trasformabile was released that same year, it was now equipped with the more powerful 55 PS (40 kW) "1200" engine (1221 cc). Production of this model continued until 1959, with circa 2360 of the 1.2-litre Trasformabiles built. The 1.2 also received slight changes to the front and rear design, with bigger headlights being the most noticeable difference.

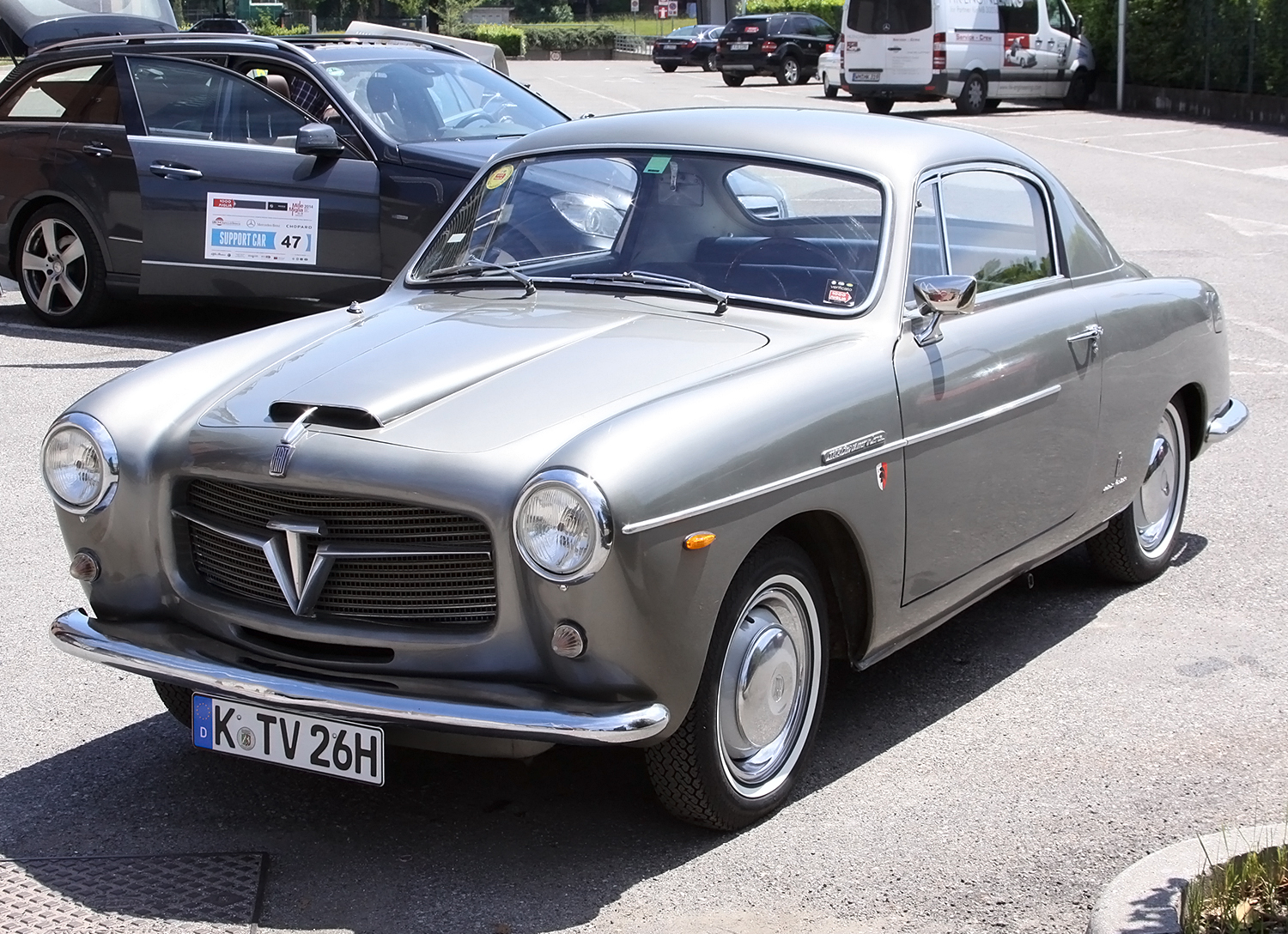
1954 Fiat 1100 TV coupé Pinin Farina

==== 1100 TV coupé Pinin Farina ====
From 1954 to 1956 Italian coachbuilder Pinin Farina independently built and sold a 2-door 2+2 coupé based on 1100 TV mechanicals, in a small series of about 780 examples. The design was first seen on a one-off displayed at the 1953 Paris Motor Show and entered by Umberto Agnelli at a race event held in 1954 near Turin, the Orbassano 6 hours Cup. The hand-built body was steel with aluminium doors, bonnet and boot lid; starting from 1955 a panoramic rear window was used, similar to the one found on coeval Pinin Farina-bodied Ferraris.

=== 1956: 1100/103 E ===
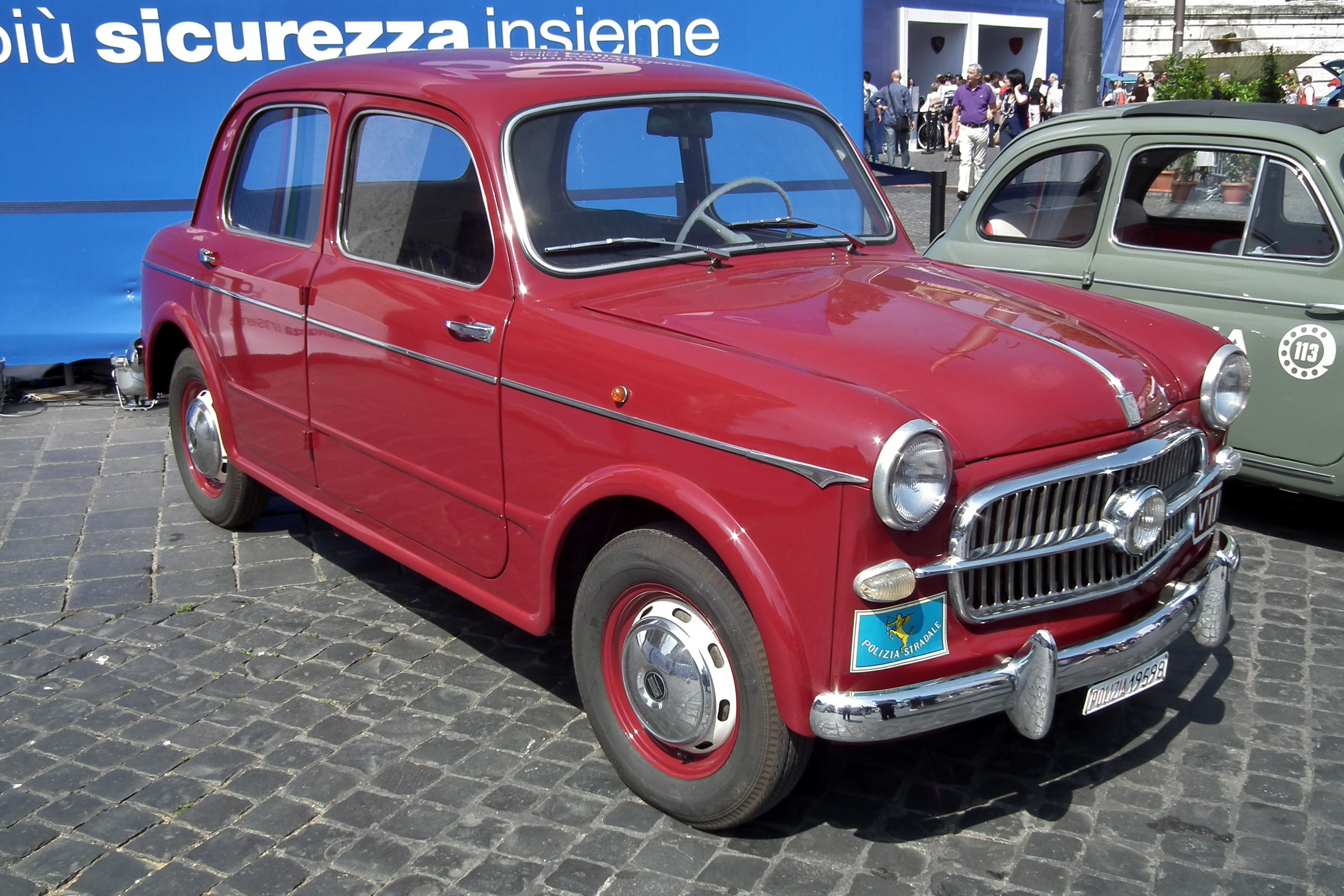
Fiat 1100/103 E of the Italian police

In June 1956, after three years and 257,000 cars built, the entire 1100/103 range was updated. The new series bore the type code 103 E. All models—saloon type A and B, Familiare, TV and TV Trasformabile—were continued. Compression ratios were raised to 7:1 for the standard engine and 8:1 for the Turismo Veloce's, for a 4 PS (to 40 PS CUNA at 4,400 rpm) and 3 PS (to 53 PS CUNA at 5,200 rpm) gain in power respectively. Suspension was made softer, and the steering geometry altered. Standard saloons wore new chrome trim and a new radiator grille with vertical bars and a rectangular fog lamp in the middle, à la TV; the TV also had a similarly redesigned grille, but now had two rectangular driving lamps, one under each headlight. The TV's contrasting paint colour was extended the body sides, from the side trim down. Inside the dashboard was new, and featured a strip speedometer, an ivory plastic steering wheel, and a lower padded fascia; new features were a glove compartment, armrests to all four redesigned door cards, two-tone seat upholstery, and a windscreen washer. Luggage space was improved by adopting a fold-down rear backrest and moving the spare tyre under the boot floor. The Trasformabile roadster was updated too to the new TV specifications; the 103 E TV Trasformabile can be identified from details like the turn signals, no more supported by chrome stems but rather attached directly to the front wings.

=== 1958: 1100/103 D ===
In September 1957 the 1100 was updated again as a 1958 model, most notably with a completely redesigned rear end, and took on the new type code 103 D. It premiered at the Paris Motor Show in October, together with the new 1200 Granluce. The latter was an elegant saloon, developed from the 1100 designing a more modern bodyshell and enlarging the engine to 1.2 litres, and replaced the 1100 TV. Therefore, the 1100 range was left temporarily without an upmarket variant, and consisted of just two models: saloon and estate, both sporting contrasting colour roofs as standard. The saloon's new tail was longer and carried tailfins. Boot space had increased, and the rear window had also been enlarged. On the other hand, the estate's sheetmetal was unchanged; body-colour buttresses were added to fit the new tail lights to the 1954-vintage body. Almost all of the exterior trim was new, including door handles and turn signal repeaters. Exterior distinguishing features of the 1958 model were a new grille made of thin vertical bars crossed by four horizontal ones, with a Millecento (1100 spelled out in Italian) script on its centre, and "stepped" chrome spears on the sides. From a mechanical standpoint the main improvement were the uprated brakes, with self-centering brake shoes and wider drums, transversely instead of longitudinally finned. Engine output went up from 40 to 43 PS CUNA (32 kW) (48 PS SAE) at 4,800 rpm, thanks to a larger carburettor, a new aluminium cylinder head, and a water-cooled inlet manifold with an individual duct per each cylinder. Top speed rose accordingly to 125 km/h (78 mph).

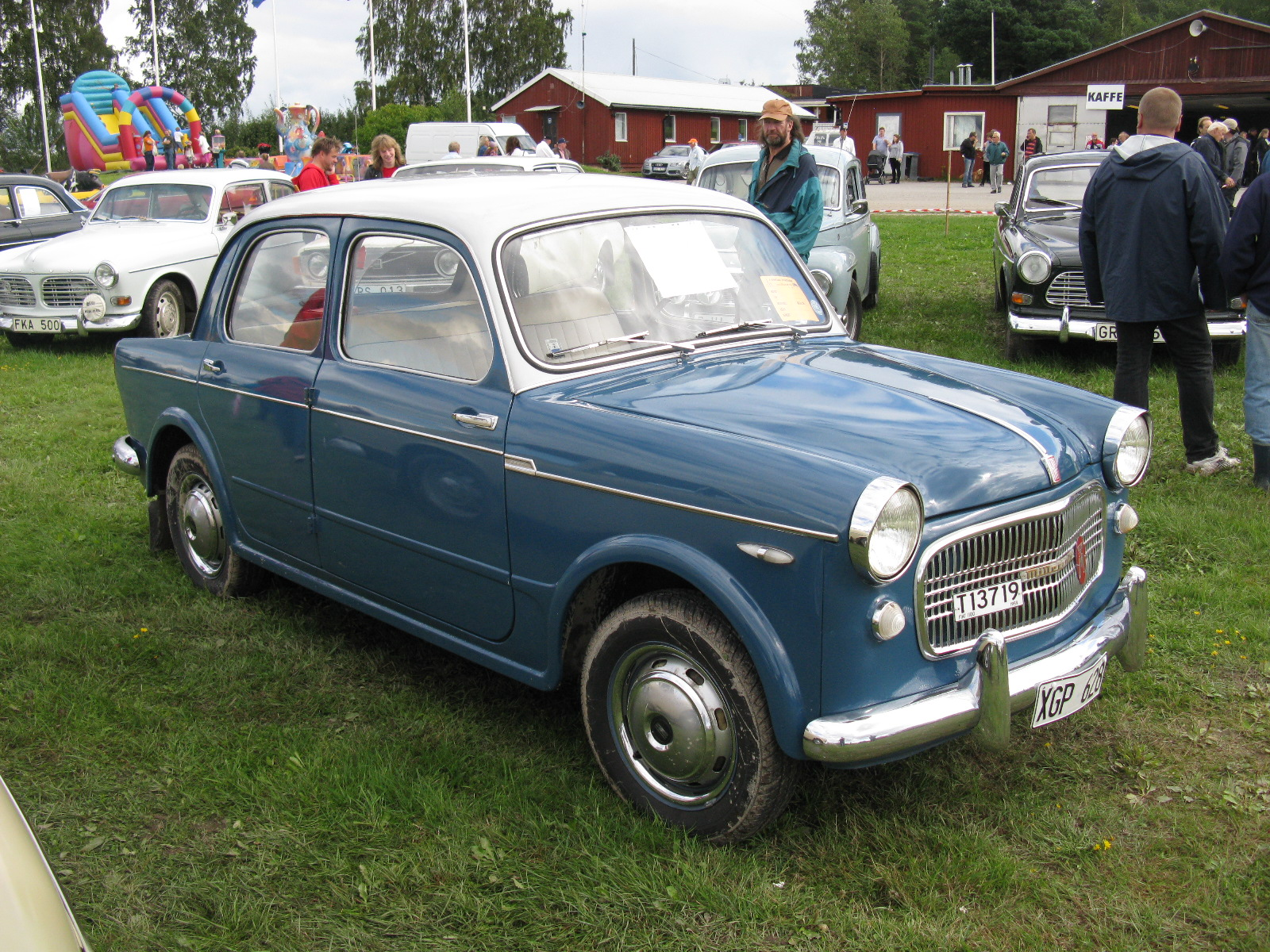
1958 Fiat 1100/103 D

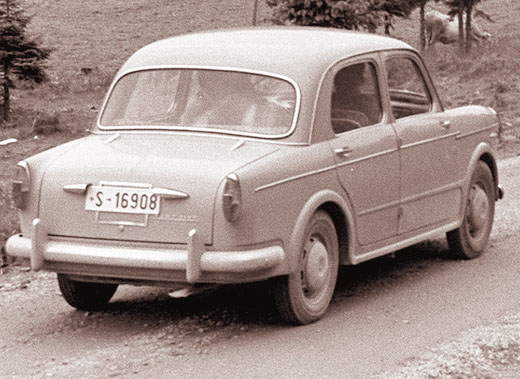
The new rear end of the 103 D

=== 1959: 1100/103 H Lusso ===
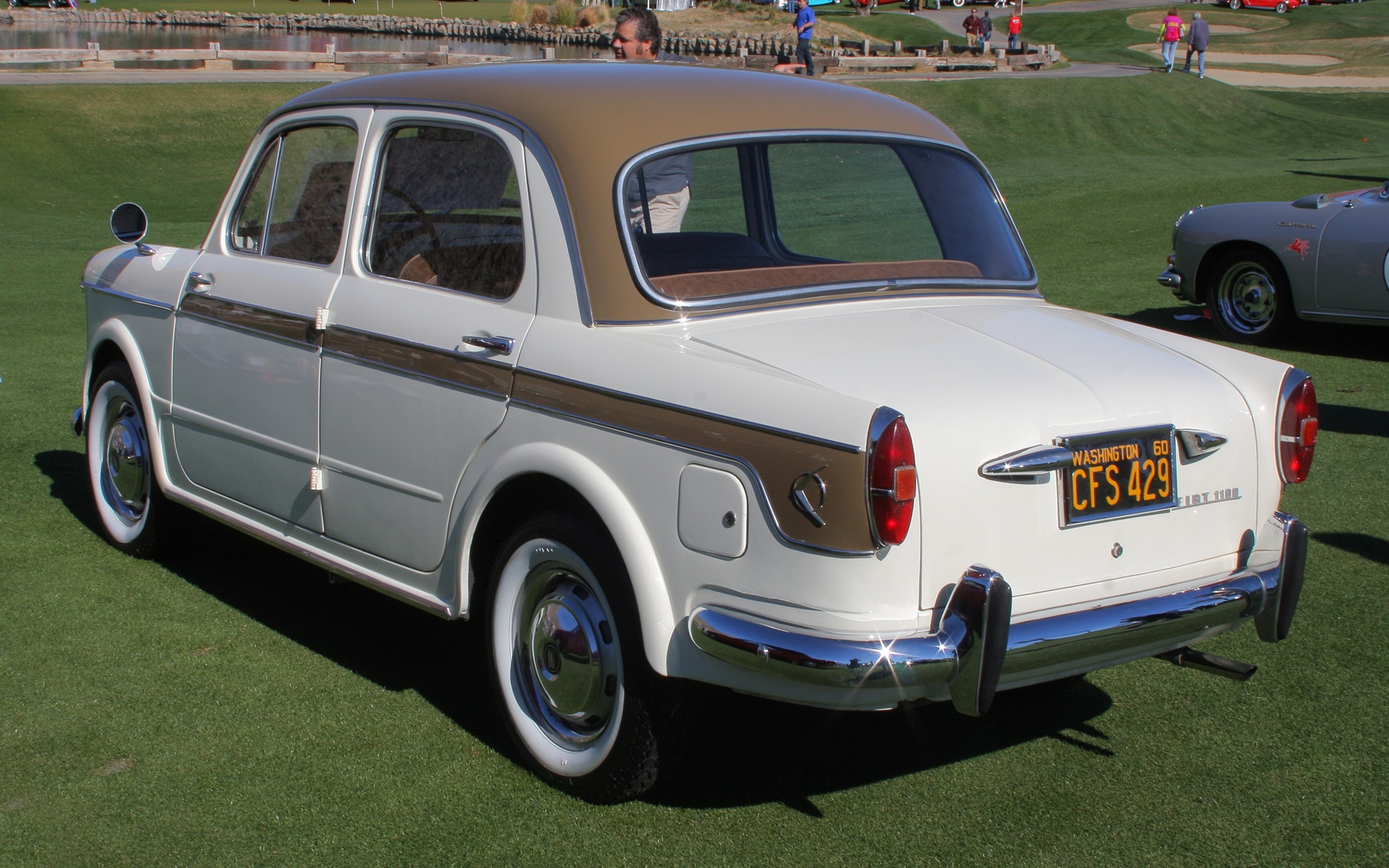
1960 Fiat 1100 Lusso

In 1959 Fiat re-introduced an upmarket 1100 model, positioned between the standard saloon and the 1200 Granluce: the 1100 Lusso (type 103 H), also known as De luxe or Luxus on foreign markets. Based on the 1100 model 1958 bodyshell, the Lusso was distinguished by elaborate exterior trim. At the front for the first time on a 1100 the Fiat badge was moved from the bonnet to the centre of the grille, featuring a new square mesh radiator. The body-side chrome spear split in two to encompass a contrasting colour band (matching the roof paint) extended from the front doors to the end of the rear quarter panels, where there was a brass-plated ornament. The fuel filler cap was hidden under a lockable flap. There were new hubcaps, and the bumpers carried tall rubber-edged overriders. New interior features were a padded vinyl shelf added below the dashboard, and wind deflectors fixed to the front side windows. Thanks to a twin-choke carburettor and a higher 7.85:1 compression ratio the Lusso's 1.1-litre engine developed 50 PS CUNA (37 kW) (55 PS SAE), rather than the 43 PS CUNA of the model 1958 1100. Top speed was 130 km/h (81 mph). Another change from the regular saloons was the two-piece propshaft, inherited from the TV saloons.

=== 1960: 1100/103 H Export and Special ===
Late in 1960 the 1958 1100/103 D and the 1110/103 H Lusso were replaced by three models, first shown at the November 1960 Turin Motor Show: the 1100 Export, the pricier 1100 Special, and the 1100 Familiare station wagon.

The Special changed its name depending on the market—e.g. it was named Speciale in Italy and Spezial in Germany. The main difference between Special and Export saloons was the sheetmetal: the Export used a 103 H Lusso bodyshell, while the Special became the first 1100 with four front-hinged doors, as it adopted the more modern 1200 Granluce's bodyshell. Otherwise the two saloons had nearly identical interior trim and equipment. Both had been stripped of the Granluce and Lusso's glitzy trim and their complex paint schemes—though a contrast colour roof remained optional on the Special. Sole concessions to ornamentation were a chrome spear down the side and factory-fitted whitewall tyres, with a thicker band on the Special. Export, Special and Familiare all used the same front end, as fitted to the Lusso and the 1959 restyled Granluce; front and rear the bumpers had less bulky over-riders, without rubber inserts. The Familiare did not change much externally, receiving the new grille but keeping the rear-hinged doors. It also received the 103 H engine and chassis code.

The engine was the twin-carburettor tipo 103 H (50 PS CUNA) carried over from the outgoing Lusso, for a 130 km/h top speed. Thanks to new flexible rubber mounts it was possible to replace the two-piece propshaft with a simpler one-piece one, even with the more powerful engine. A Saxomat automatic clutch was available as on option on the Special only. At some point during the Special's production run the tooling was modified, eliminating the decorative ridges extending from the front wheel opening to the front door, present since 1953. 1100 Export and Special remained on sale until 1962, when they were both replaced by the Fiat 1100 D.

Also, the 103 D Export was made in Argentina between 1960 and 1963 by Fiat Someca Concord S.A.C.I. in Ferreyra, Córdoba province. 23,152 units was made. These were nicknamed "millecento" and are specially loved by Italian descendants.

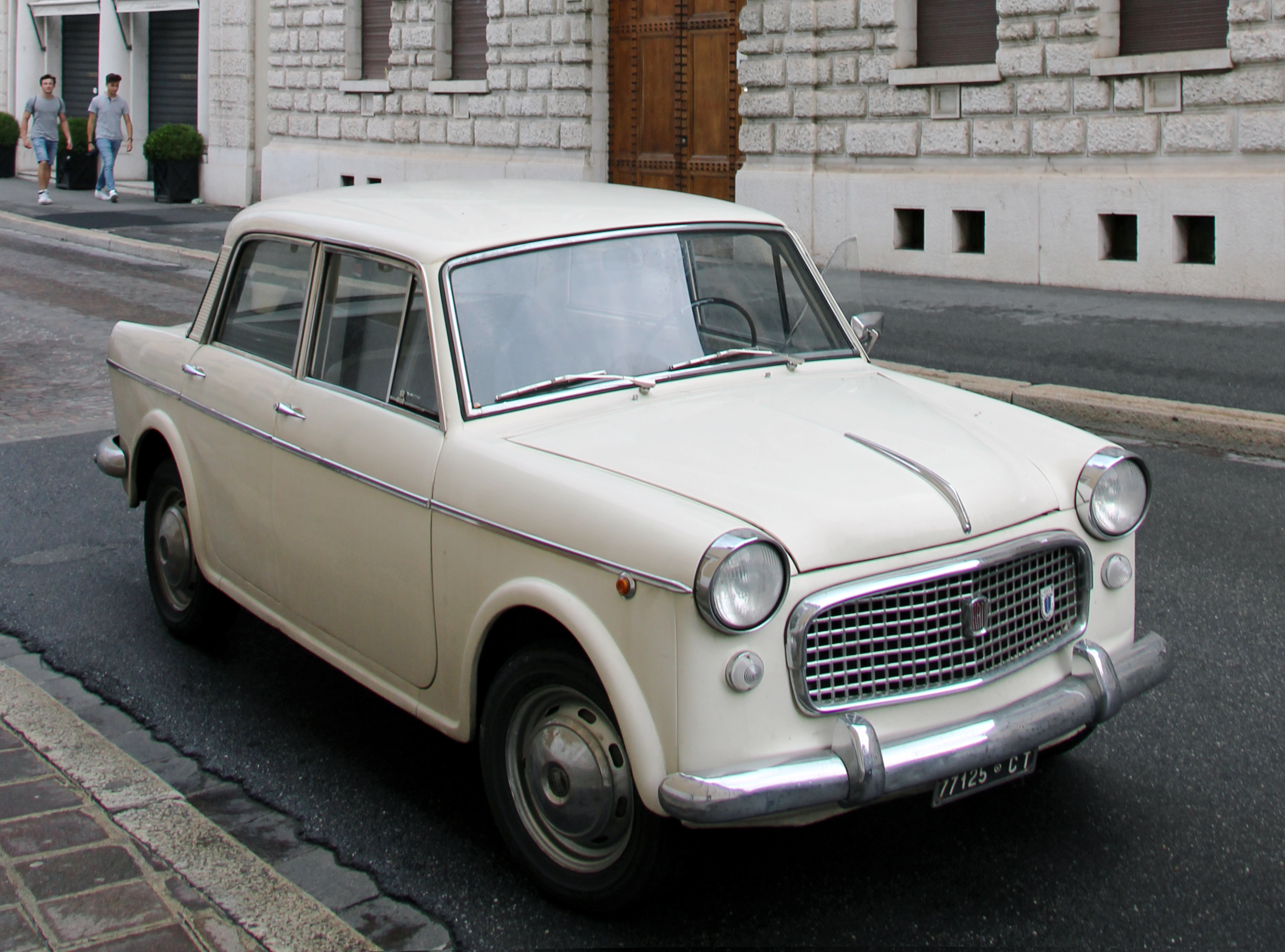
Fiat 1100 Special; note the front-hinged doors

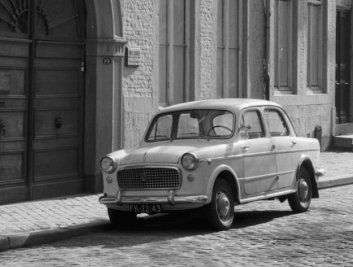
Fiat 1100 Export

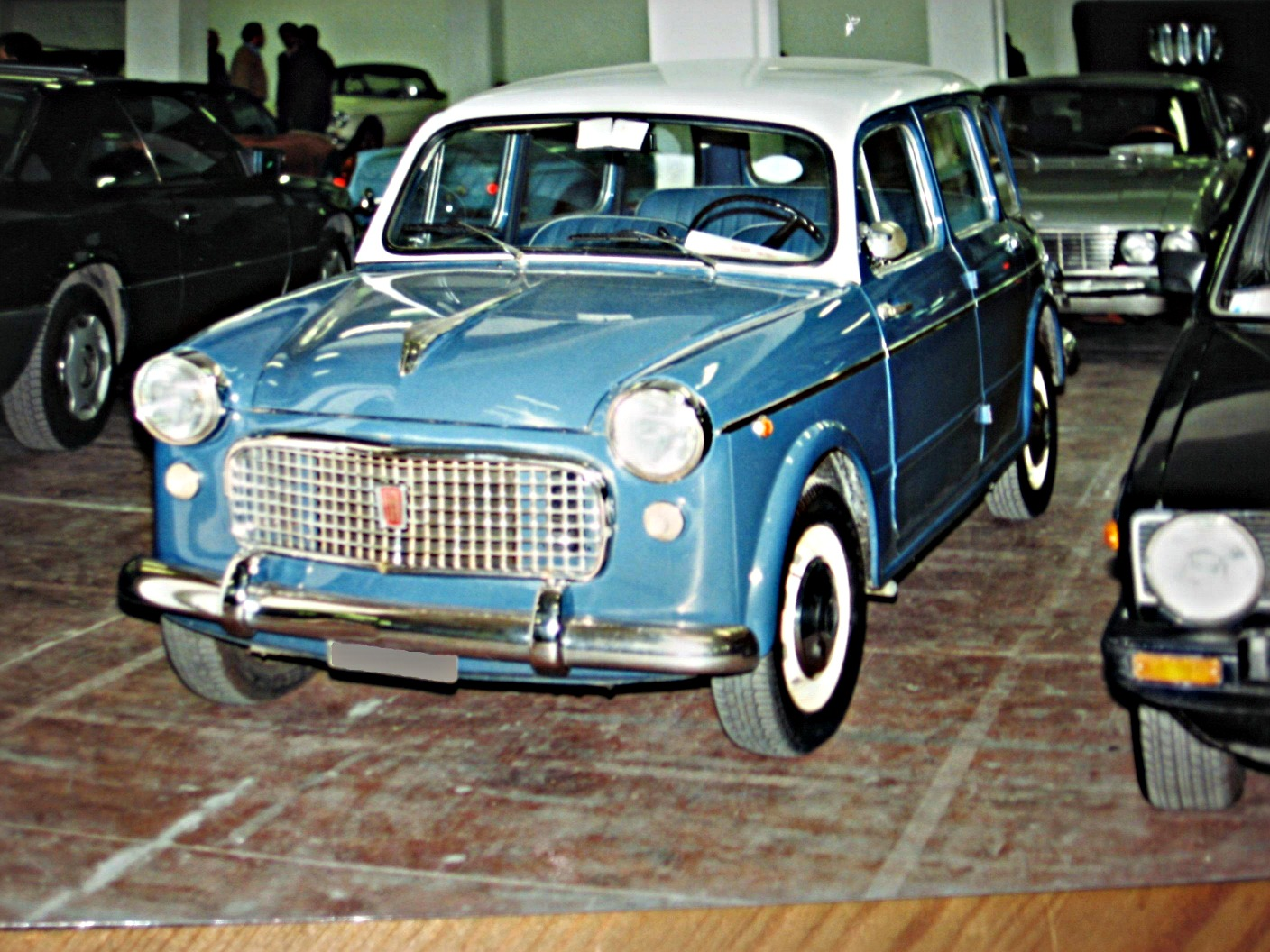
Fiat 1100/103 H Familiare

=== Indian production by PAL ===
The Fiat 1100/103 was imported to India and sold by Premier Automobiles Limited (PAL). The older model was known as the Millecento and the one with the centre light (Chest light) on the front grille (1100/103 E) as the Elegant. In 1958, the 1100/103 D (tailfin model) was introduced as the Select. It was followed by the Super Select in 1961. By 1964, the 1100 D Delight was introduced and it was assembled in India by PAL. This model has most of the parts manufactured locally. In India it was considered a sportier alternative to the Hindustan Ambassador.

== 1100 D ==
Fiat 1100 D
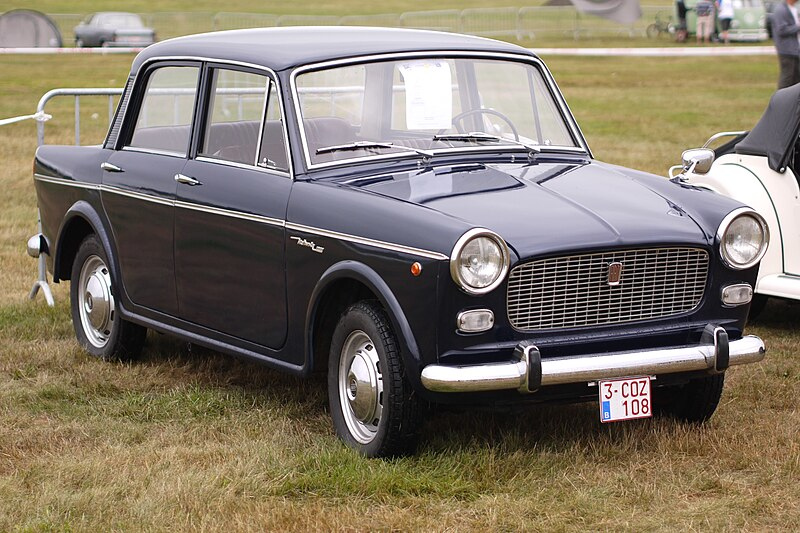
- Fiat 1100 D saloon

Overview
- Manufacturer: Fiat
- Also called: NSU-Fiat; Fiat Nettunia; Zastava 1100E; Premier President/Padmini
- Production: 1962–1966 (Europe); 1964–2000 (India)
- Assembly: Italy: Mirafiori, Turin; Belgium: Fiat-Sanaf; India: Mumbai; Iran: Tehran; Taiwan: Changhua; West Germany: Heilbronn (NSU Automobil AG)

Body and chassis
- Body style: 4-door saloon; 4-door estate
- Layout: Front-engine, rear-wheel-drive
- Related: Premier Padmini

Powertrain
- Engine: 1,221 cc I4 (petrol)
- Transmission: 4-speed manual

Dimensions
- Length: 3,900 mm (154 in)
- Width: 1,460 mm (57.5 in)
- Height: 1,470 mm (57.8 in)
- Curb weight: 896–930 kg (1,975–2,050 lb)

Retaining the exterior changes of this model, in 1962 Fiat introduced the third generation 1100, called the 1100 D. It was a four-door sedan, very similar to the Granluce but with simpler sides and a new simpler rectangular front end. The 1100 D was a successful Italian family car in the early sixties and was accompanied by a Familiare (estate version) and a Deluxe model that offered a higher performance of 50 PS (37 kW), extra side moldings, front bench seat with two reclining backs and carpet floor mats. The rear seatback could be folded down, allowing for longer cargo to be carried. These survived without any substantial alteration until 1966, when the introduction of the groundbreaking 124 model imposed a further change in styling. Power was 40 PS (29 kW) at the time of introduction, which was soon increased to 43 PS (32 kW).

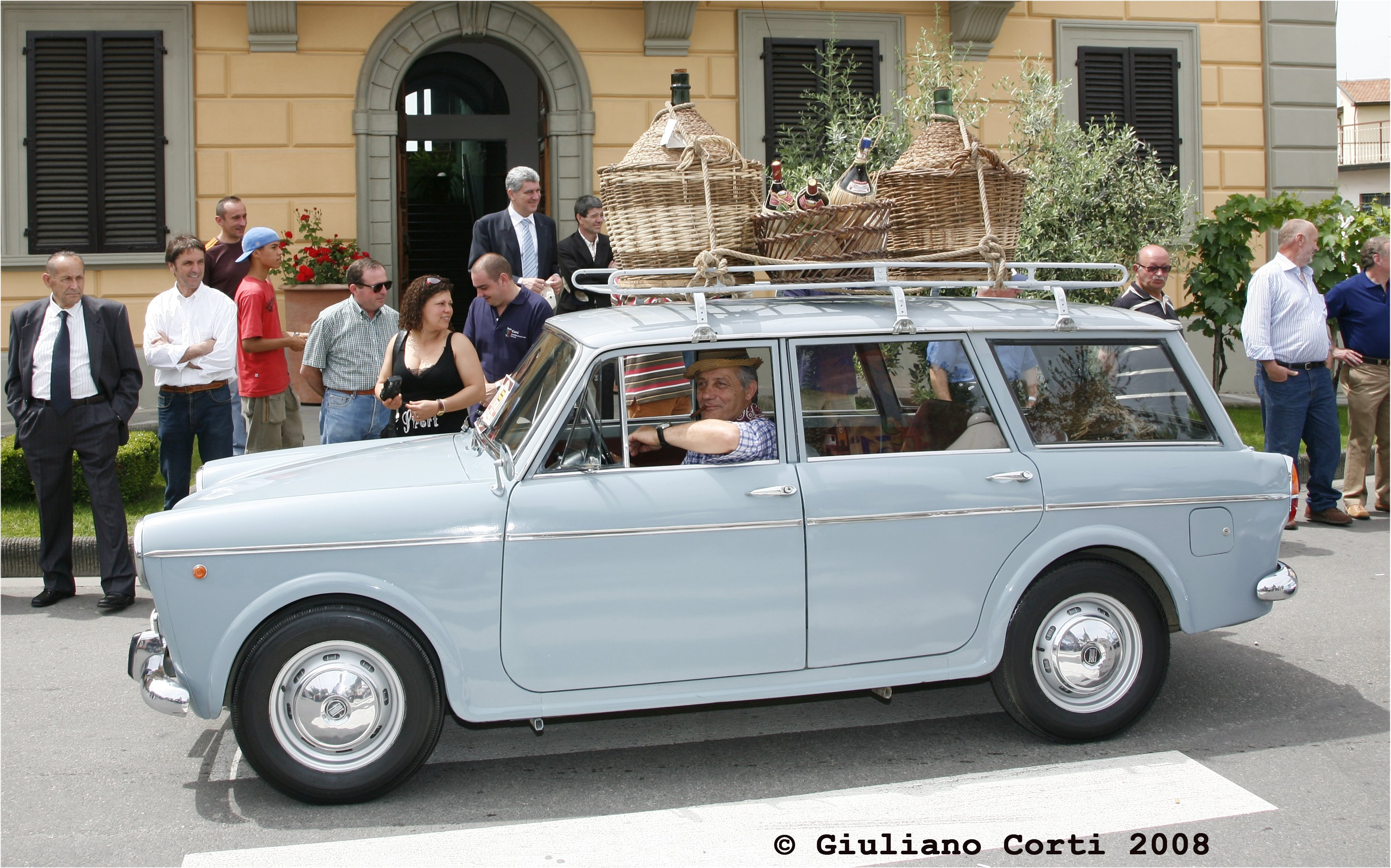
Fiat 1100 D Familiare

The Fiat 1100 D was manufactured under licence in India by the Premier Automobiles Limited beginning in 1964. The vehicle was initially marketed as the Fiat 1100 D, as the Premier President for model year 1972, and as the Premier Padmini since 1974 until its discontinuation in 2000. By 1993, a diesel version with a 1366 cc diesel engine made in collaboration with FNM from Italy and was badged as the Premier Padmini 137D.The car manufacturing plant was closed down by 2000.

== 1100 R ==
Fiat 1100 R
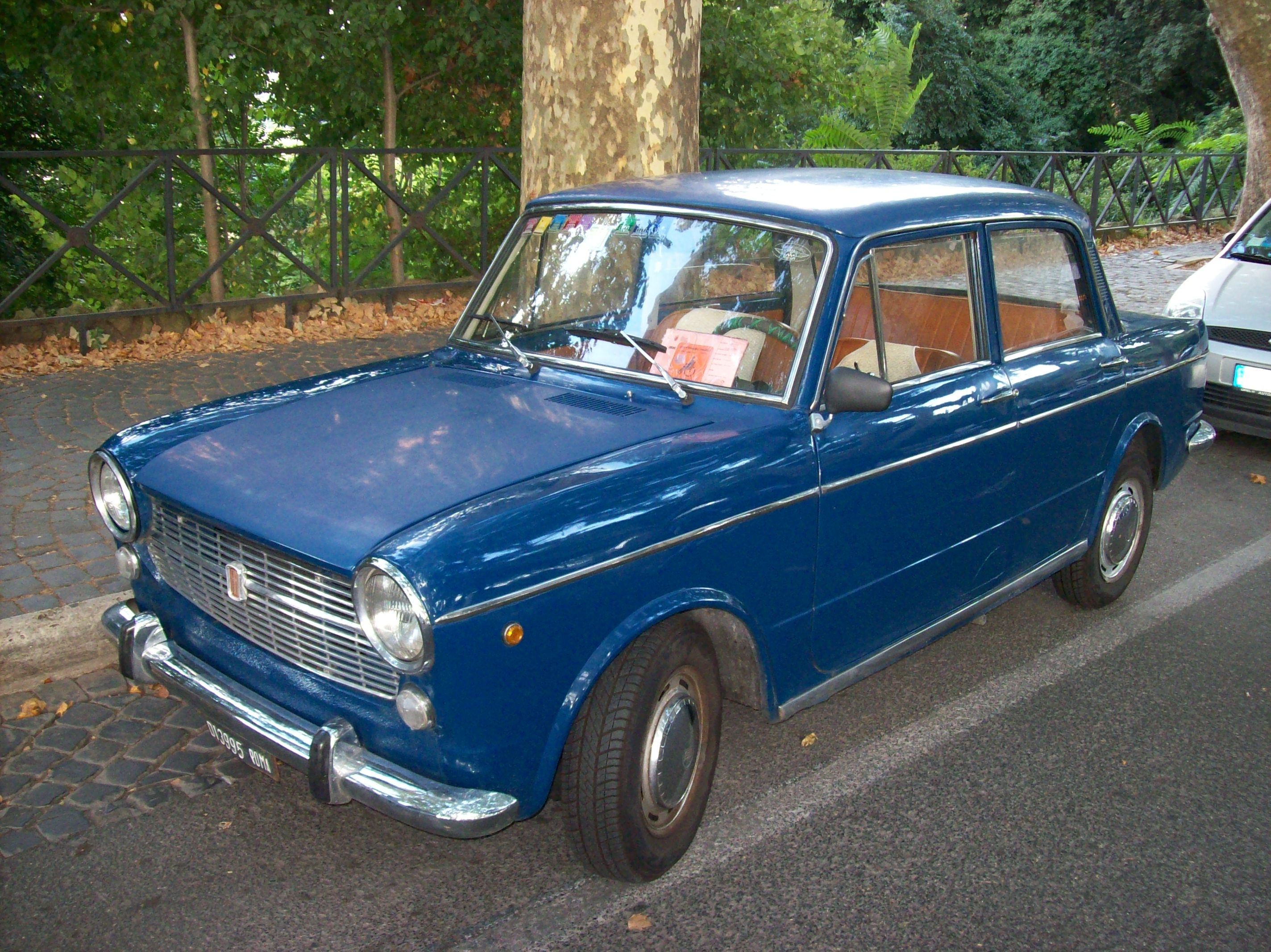
- 1967 Fiat 1100 R

Overview
- Manufacturer: Fiat
- Also called: Fiat-Neckar Europa; Zastava 1100 R
- Production: 1966–1969
- Assembly: Italy: Mirafiori, Turin; Egypt: Cairo (El Nasr); Iran: Tehran; Taiwan: Changhua; West Germany: Heilbronn (NSU Automobil AG)

Body and chassis
- Body style: 4-door saloon; 4-door estate
- Layout: Front-engine, rear-wheel-drive

Powertrain
- Engine: 1,089 cc I4 (petrol)
- Transmission: 4-speed manual

Dimensions
- Length: 3,965 mm (156.1 in)
- Width: 1,465 mm (57.7 in)
- Height: 1,440 mm (56.7 in)
- Curb weight: 850 kg (1,874 lb)

The very last 1100 model, born in February 1966, was the 1100 R ("R" stood for Rinnovata; "refreshed"). It had a longer, straighter and slimmer line, with a square back and a front-end look not very different from its bigger sister the Fiat 124. In terms of styling cues, the vestigial fins were further suppressed and the simple round rear light cluster from the Fiat 850 replaced the vertical form seen on the 1100 D. At the same time, the larger engine was withdrawn in order to avoid undue overlap with the 124. The 1100 R was offered only with the older 1,089 cc engine, now with a compression ratio of 8:1 and a claimed output of 48 bhp (36 kW). This engine (with a somewhat narrower bore) had been first introduced in the 1937 508 C Balilla 1100.

Clutch and gearbox were little changed, but the return of a floor mounted gear lever positioned between the front seats and connected to the gearbox with a rod linkage system was welcomed by the motoring press. The absence of synchromesh on the bottom forward speed nevertheless offered a reminder that under the surface this was becoming a somewhat aging design. Between the gearbox and the differential, the propeller shaft had now been separated into two parts with three couplings. The interior was simplified somewhat, in part by using certain parts from the 850, such as the steering wheel.

The boot was usefully expanded, helped by a slight increase in the car's overall length, and with more careful packaging of the spare wheel (under the floor) and the fuel tank (in the rear wing on the right). As configured for UK sales, reclining front seats were available as an optional extra for £8. The Familiare's rear end remained mostly unchanged, keeping the old taillights.

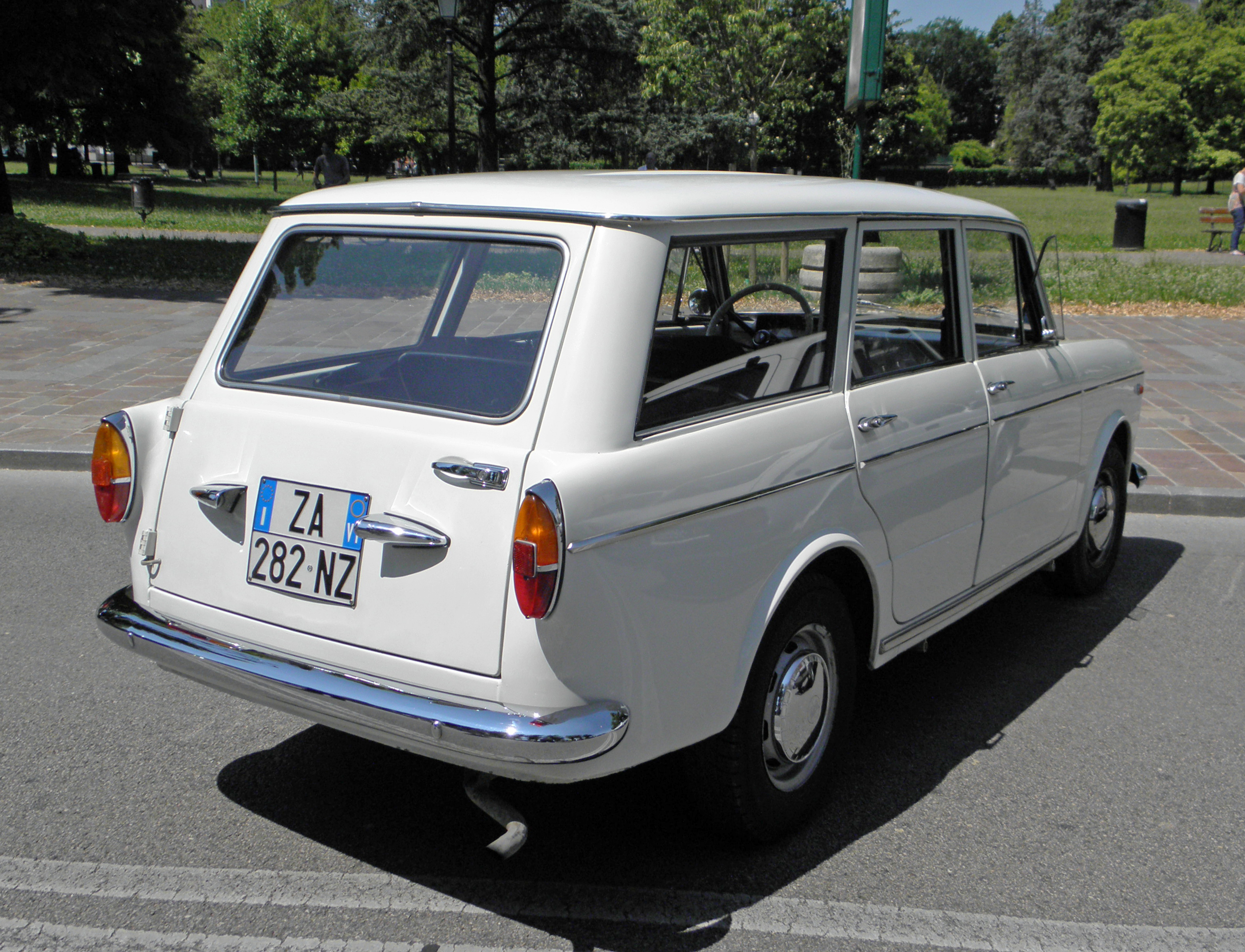
Fiat 1100 R Familiare, rear view

The 1100 R finally gave way in October 1969 to the new, middle-class Fiat 128 which had gone on sale five months earlier. It was also assembled by the Neckar-Automobilwerke in Heilbronn, Germany. Called the Neckar 1100 Millecento it only differed lightly in trim.

== 1100 T ==
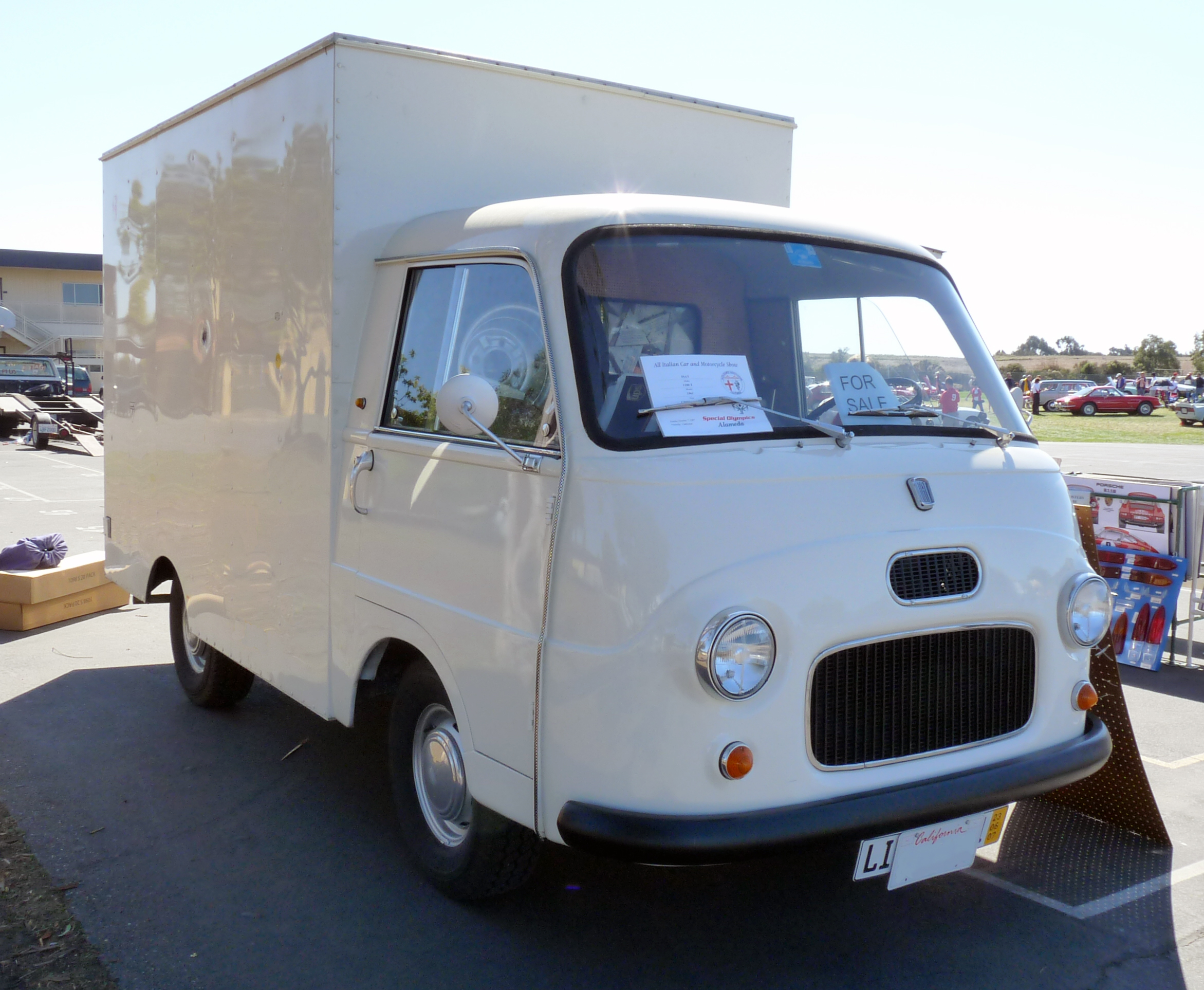
1960s Fiat 1100T

The Fiat 1100 T was made from 1957 as a panel van, pickup and minibus. The car was equipped with a in-line engine with 1,089 cc (type 103 D.007) with 38 PS (28 kW) at 4800 rpm and it had a top speed of 90 km/h (56 mph).

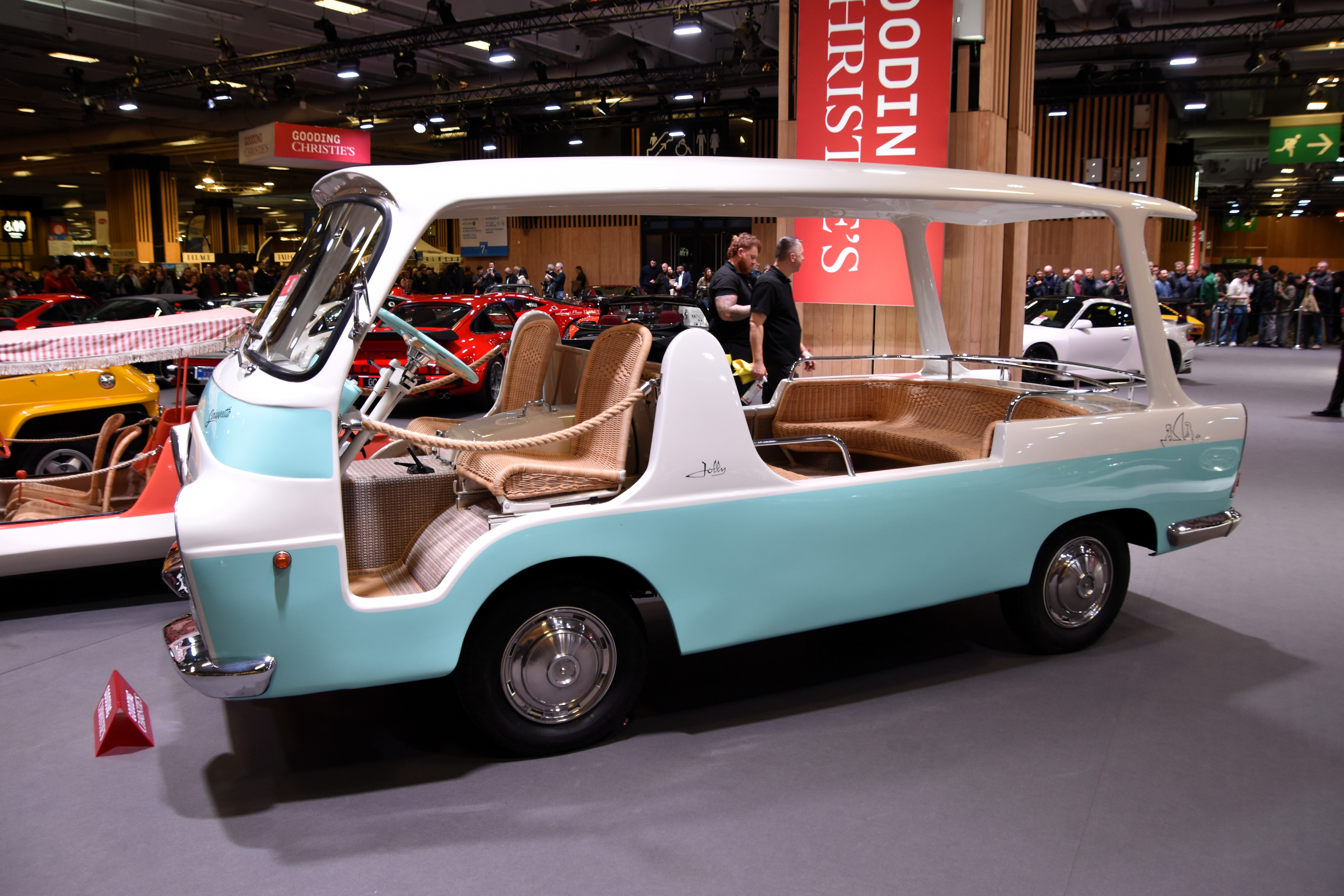
1962 Fiat 1100 T2 Spiaggetta

In 1959, its successor was unveiled, the Fiat 1100 T2, that had a 45 PS (33 kW) 1,222 cc engine. Production continued with a steady stream of updated engines, until production of the 1100 T4 finally came to an end in 1971.
