= Neker =

Neker may be:

- an Old Swedish name for the nix water spirits
- a Limburgish name for the river Jeker

== See also ==
- Necker (disambiguation)
