= Necker (surname) =

Necker is a surname. Notable people with the surname include:

- Jacques Necker (1732–1804), French-Swiss banker, and French Minister of Finance under Louis XVI
- Madame Necker (1737–1794), French-Swiss salonist and writer. Wife of Jacques Necker.
- Louis Albert Necker (1786–1861), Swiss crystallographer
- Albertine Necker de Saussure (1766–1841), Swiss writer and educationalist
- Noël Martin Joseph Necker (December 25 1730 – 30 December 1793), German physician and botanist.

Fictional characters:

- Evelyn Necker, character from the Marvel UK imprint of Marvel Comics
