= HMS Necker =

Armed transport ship captured by HMS Hannibal in 1781

History

France
- Name: Necker
- Namesake: Jacques Necker
- In service: 1779
- Captured: October 1781

Great Britain
- Name: HMS Necker
- Acquired: October 1781 by capture
- Fate: Lost, presumed foundered December 1781

General characteristics
- Notes: Several sources confuse this Necker with the French privateer Necker that an armed whaler captured early in 1781 in the North Sea. There is also the possibility that both of these have been conflated with a third Necker, of about 600 tons burthen, that foundered in December 1789 at Malacca.

HMS Necker was the armed transport Necker or Neker that HMS Hannibal captured off the Cape of Good Hope on 25 October 1781. Hannibal encountered the French frigate Bellone, escorting the transports Neker and Sévère. She captured the transports and brought them to Saint Helena. Necker may have been a flute that served the French navy from 1779 to 1781, but for which there is no information other than her existence.

Hannibal took Necker to Saint Helena. There Commander Charles Carpenter commissioned Necker as a sixth rate, with a crew drawn from Hannibal. She was sent to the East Indies to augment the British naval forces there.

She disappeared, presumed foundered, circa December 1781 on her way from Saint Helena to the East Indies.

== See also ==
- List of people who disappeared mysteriously at sea
