= Necker (1779 ship) =

History

France
- Name: Necker
- Namesake: Jacques Necker
- Owner: 1779/07 - 1779: de Longuemart; 1779/12 - 1780: Haussoulier
- In service: 1779
- Captured: Early 1781

General characteristics
- Tons burthen: 150 (bm)
- Complement: 88–130
- Armament: 20 guns
- Notes: Several sources confuse this Necker, captured in early 1781, with the Necker that Hannibal captured near the Cape of Good Hope in October 1781.

Necker was a French privateer operating out of Dunkirk from 1779. She made several cruises before she was herself captured early in 1781.

== Career ==
For her first cruise, in 1779, Necker was under the command of Guillaume Fauhé.

From July 1779 Necker cruised under the command of Cornil-Jacques Bart, with 125 men and 18 guns. She took three prizes.

On her third cruise in 1779 she was under the command of Jean-Félix Houssois.

Her fourth cruise took place in 1781. She was under the command of François Mougin with 88 men, 16 guns, and 4 swivel guns at the time she was captured.

== Capture ==
HMS Leith captured Necker and sent her in to Lerwick some time before 28 April. Necker initially spotted and chased Leith, which found she could not outrun the privateer and turned to engage her. Necker then mistook Leith for a frigate and began to sail away from her, only to lose her topmast in her haste to escape. Leith was then able to catch up with the privateer which quickly surrendered, having already thrown her guns overboard in an attempt to increase speed.

However, Lloyd's List reported in May 1781 that it was the Greenlandman Marianne, Brown, master, that had captured Necker and taken her into Lerwick. (Note: Marianne, of London and 300 tons (bm), had been launched on the Thames in 1750. She had been whaling in Davis Strait but then became a privateer. A secondary source also attributes the capture of a privateer in 1781 to the London-based Marianne. Furthermore, it credits Marianne with capturing a 10-gun cutter privateer in 1782, and recapturing a Newcastle collier from the Dutch privateers that had captured her.)
