= Neckář =

Neckář (feminine Neckářová) is a Czech surname. Notable people include:

- Jan Neckář, Czech wrestler
- Stanislav Neckář, Czech ice hockey player
- Václav Neckář, Czech singer
- Zuzana Neckářová, Czech cyclist
