= Neckar (car) =

Defunct German car manufacturer

NSU-Fiat/Neckar
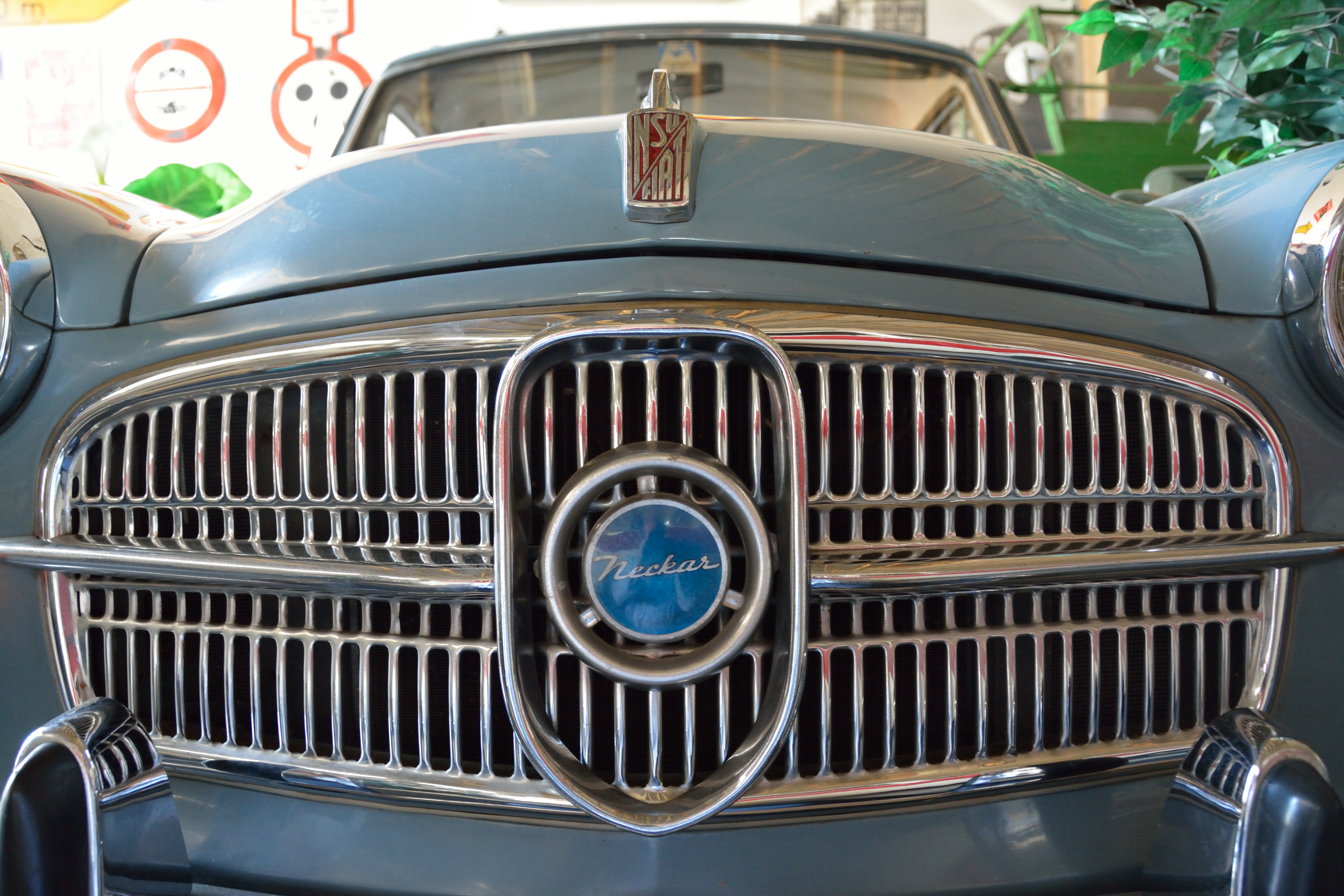
- Industry: Automotive
- Founded: 1957
- Defunct: 1971
- Fate: Complete takeover by Fiat
- Successor: Fiat; Audi
- Headquarters: Germany
- Key people: Hans-Theodor Schütmann, founder
- Products: Neckar Weinsberg, Neckar Jagst, Neckar Europa, Neckar Panorama, Neckar Adria, Neckar Mistral, Neckar Riviera
- Parent: NSU

NSU-Fiat was a German automobile manufacturer which produced Fiat vehicles under license at a plant acquired from NSU in Heilbronn from 1929 to 1957, and between 1957 and 1971 as Neckar Automobilwerke AG.

In 1957, following a complicated litigation process over the right to use the by now increasingly high profile "NSU" name on passenger cars, the name used for the Fiat-designed cars was changed to Neckar, and with this name the company continued to produce Fiats in West Germany until 1971.

== History ==
NSU Motorenwerke (subsequently NSU Werke) AG sold its then recently completed Heilbronn car factory (near the river Neckar) in 1929 to Fiat for one Million Marks, following financial problems resulting from the economic crisis. The deal resulted from an initiative by NSU's bankers, Dresdner Bank.

=== Two separate NSU businesses ===
The 1929 deal left two businesses producing petrol driven vehicles with similar names located barely 7 kilometers (4 miles) apart: the two were frequently confused with one other. "NSU Automobil-AG" was a subsidiary of Fiat, manufacturing Fiat passenger cars carrying a "NSU-Fiat" badge and located in Heilbronn, while NSU Werke AG in nearby Neckarsulm produced motor-bikes, becoming during the 1950s one of the largest motor-bike manufacturers in the world.

=== NSU-Fiat ===
Fiat's German subsidiary started to produce Fiat Topolinos and Balillas models under license in the Heilbronn factory under the brand "NSU-Fiat". (The same Fiat-designed models were also produced under license in Nanterre, France, by SIMCA-Fiat the cars subsequently becoming known simply as "Simcas".)

The Heilbronn plant had been built in 1926 by NSU, then a motor bike manufacturer, in order to break into the passenger car market, but the project had failed and by 1929 NSU had no ambitions to produce passenger cars, and therefore no reason to object when Fiat, having bought the plant, used it to manufacture cars badged as NSU-Fiats. In 1929 friendly collaboration between NSU and the nearby Fiat subsidiary was agreed, with NSU supplying parts for the Heilbronn built Fiat models. A year later, however, relations had cooled as Fiat preferred to supply parts to its Heilbronn factory from its own Turin plant beyond the Alps, and also used the Heilbronn site as a bridgehead to facilitate the importation to Germany of fully assembled new cars from Italy.

=== Post war sporting success for NSU ===
Success by NSU Werke AG in motor-bike racing in the decade after 1945 greatly enhanced the appeal and therefore the value, especially in Germany, of the "NSU" name. With the "NSU" name more frequently in the public eye, confusion between "NSU-Fiat" and "NSU Werke" became more frequent among the general public which also affected business professionals with whom the businesses had dealings. The 1950s found NSU Werke's General Director, Dr. von Heydekampf, complaining that customers were being deceived ("grobe Kundentäuschung") because Fiat Germany were using the NSU-Fiat name to exploit the glory of the racing successes and speed records of the NSU motorbikes.

=== Re-entry into automobiles ===
In 1955 it was reported that the motorbike manufacturer NSU Werke were planning to produce a passenger car in the "approximately 400cc" class and proposed to badge the little car simply as an "NSU". This seemed likely to create even more confusion in the market place affecting Fiat's smaller "NSU-Fiat"s based on the Fiat 600, already produced in Turin since 1955 and scheduled for imminent launch as a Heilbronn produced model (with the still smaller Fiat 500 already in the development pipeline). The Heilbronn built Fiat 600 was duly launched in 1956, but because of the dispute it was badged not as an NSU-Fiat but as the "Jagst" (shortly thereafter lengthened to "Neckar-Jagst") while one class up, the new Heilbronn built Fiat 1100 also introduced in 1956 was advertised as the "Neckar". The NSU offering, when it appeared on the market in 1958 as the NSU Prinz would indeed compete in the same market segment as the baby Fiats.

=== NSU brand dispute ===
Acrimony had mounted, involving robust exchanges of lawyers' letters, and legal hearings ensued. Arguments centred on what had been agreed about rights to the "NSU" name and, in particular, whether an arguably informal letter dated 5 January 1929 on the subject had long-standing contractual force. The judge decided that the 1929 letter could not have the contractual force necessary to bind the parties over use of the "NSU" name, because of a danger that its effect, if valid, would be to damage marketplace competition and thereby run counter to the public interest. The Fiat licensee therefore felt obliged, in 1957, to rebrand all its Heilbronn assembled cars: NSU-Fiat badged cars became Neckars.

=== Fiat-designed models branded as Neckars ===
By the late 1950s, Neckar was producing no more than 25,000 vehicles a year. The lineup consisted of the Fiat 500 (Neckar Weinsberg), 600 (Neckar Jagst), and 1100 (Neckar Europa), all slightly modified and typically more luxurious and sporty than the Fiats produced in Turin.

The launch of the Fiat 1500 in 1961 and then of the Neckar Panorama (derived from the Autobianchi Bianchina Panoramica) allowed Neckar to reach a yearly production of 50,000 units in 1962. The Neckar 1500 TS (sold as the Neckar Mistral in France), a Fiat 1500-based coupé originally sold as the Siata 1500 TS was also added to the lineup that year. A coupé and a convertible based on the Fiat 600 were produced as the Neckar Riviera. The Fiat 850 (as the Neckar Adria) was the last model produced by Neckar.

== Closure ==
The high cost of the German workforce, supported by the German government’s determination to sustain what some thought was a high value for the Deutsche Mark, doomed Neckar. Fiat refused to sell the license of the new Fiat 124, 125 and 128 to Neckar. Production of Neckar slowed down from 1963. 50,000 cars were produced in 1962, down to 44,000 units in 1963, 22,000 in 1964, 18,000 in 1967 and 12,000 in 1970. Neckar closed in 1971 having produced 370,000 cars in total.

== Models ==
Model	Variant of
Neckar Weinsberg	Fiat 500
Neckar Jagst	Fiat 600
NSU-Fiat Neckar; Neckar Europa	Fiat 1100
Neckar 1100 Millecento	Fiat 1100R
Neckar Panorama	Autobianchi Bianchina
Neckar Adria	Fiat 850
Neckar Mistral	Fiat 1500 Coupé
Neckar Riviera	Fiat 600

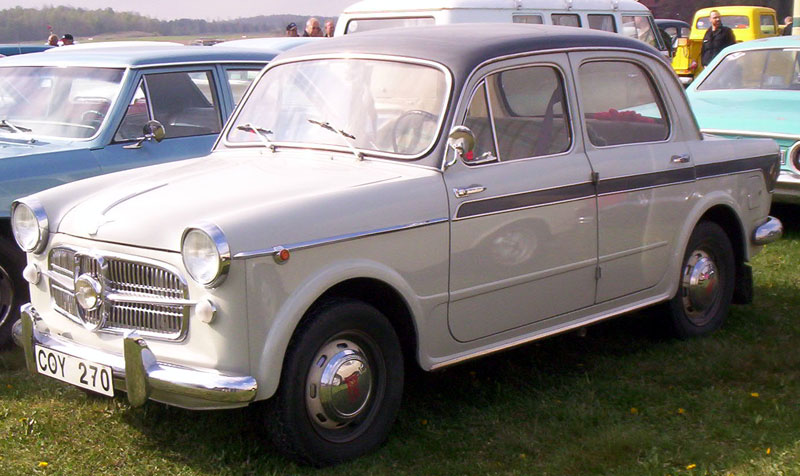
1959 Neckar Europa 4-Door Sedan

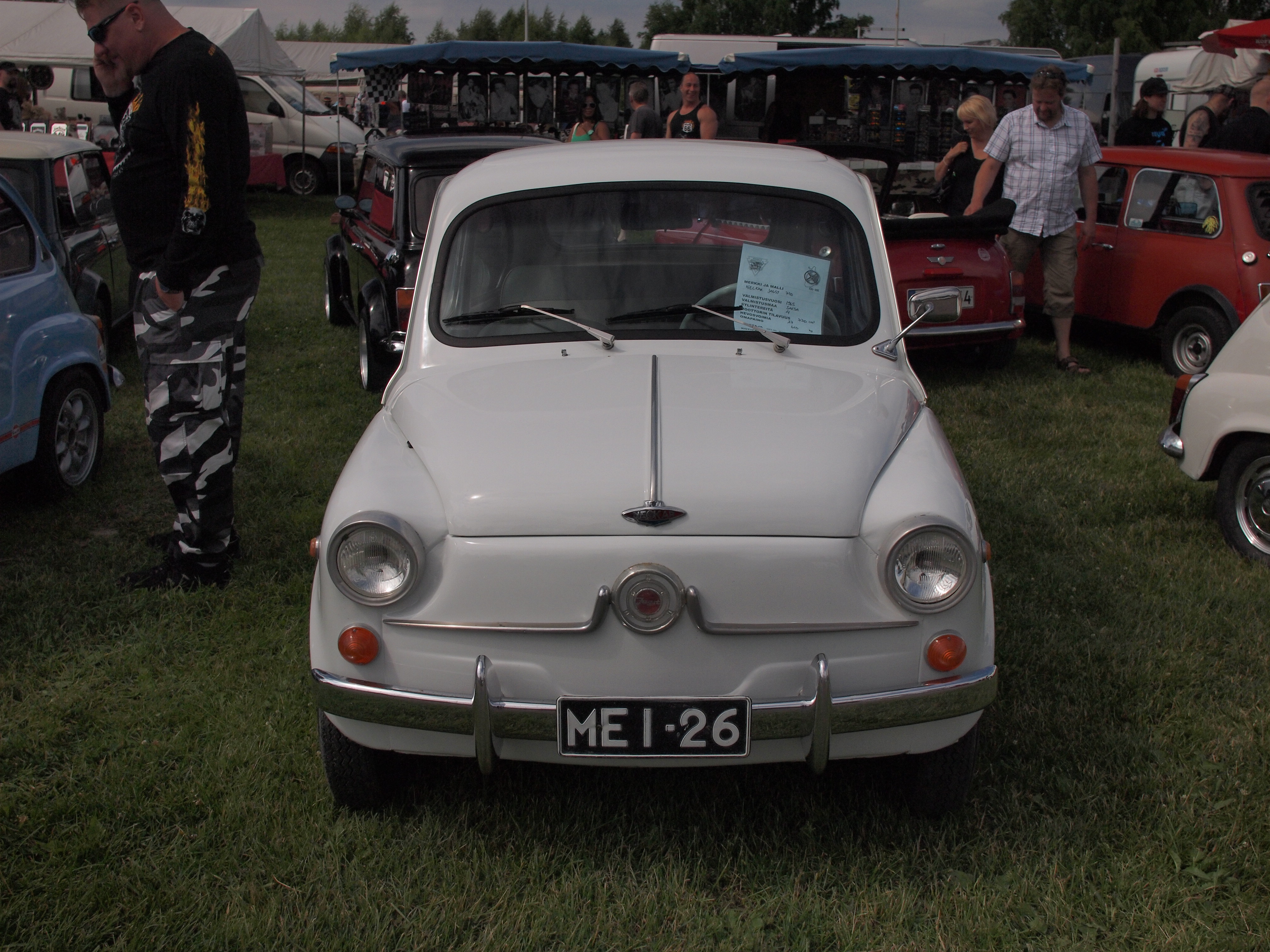
1965 Neckar Jagst 770

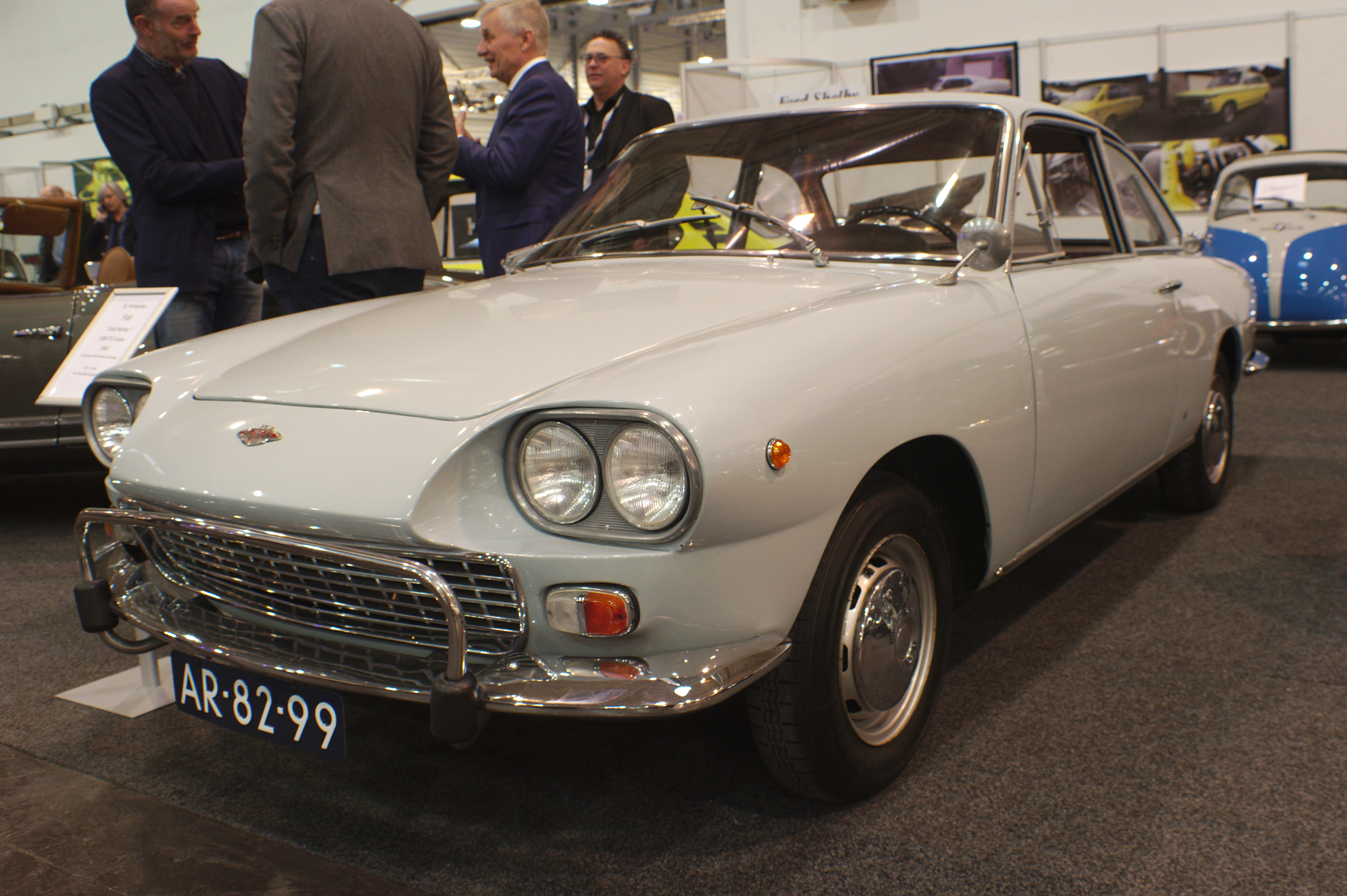
Neckar Mistral

== Bibliography ==
- Werner Oswald: Deutsche Autos Band 2 - 1920-1945. Motorbuch Verlag, Stuttgart 2005, ISBN 3-613-02170-6.
- Werner Oswald: Deutsche Autos 1945−1990, Band 4, 1. Auflage, Motorbuch Verlag, Stuttgart 2001, ISBN 3-613-02131-5

== See also ==
- List of automobile manufacturers
- Fiat
- NSU
- Audi
