= Karosseriewerke Weinsberg =

German tool and automobile manufacturer

KW logo (ca. 1969)

The Karosseriewerke Weinsberg, abbreviated KW, is a German Tooling Company based in Bretzfeld. Originally, it was founded as a Weinsberg-based car coachbuilder, that was known for their recreational vehicles. The city name Weinsberg was used as brand name from 1969 to 1992.

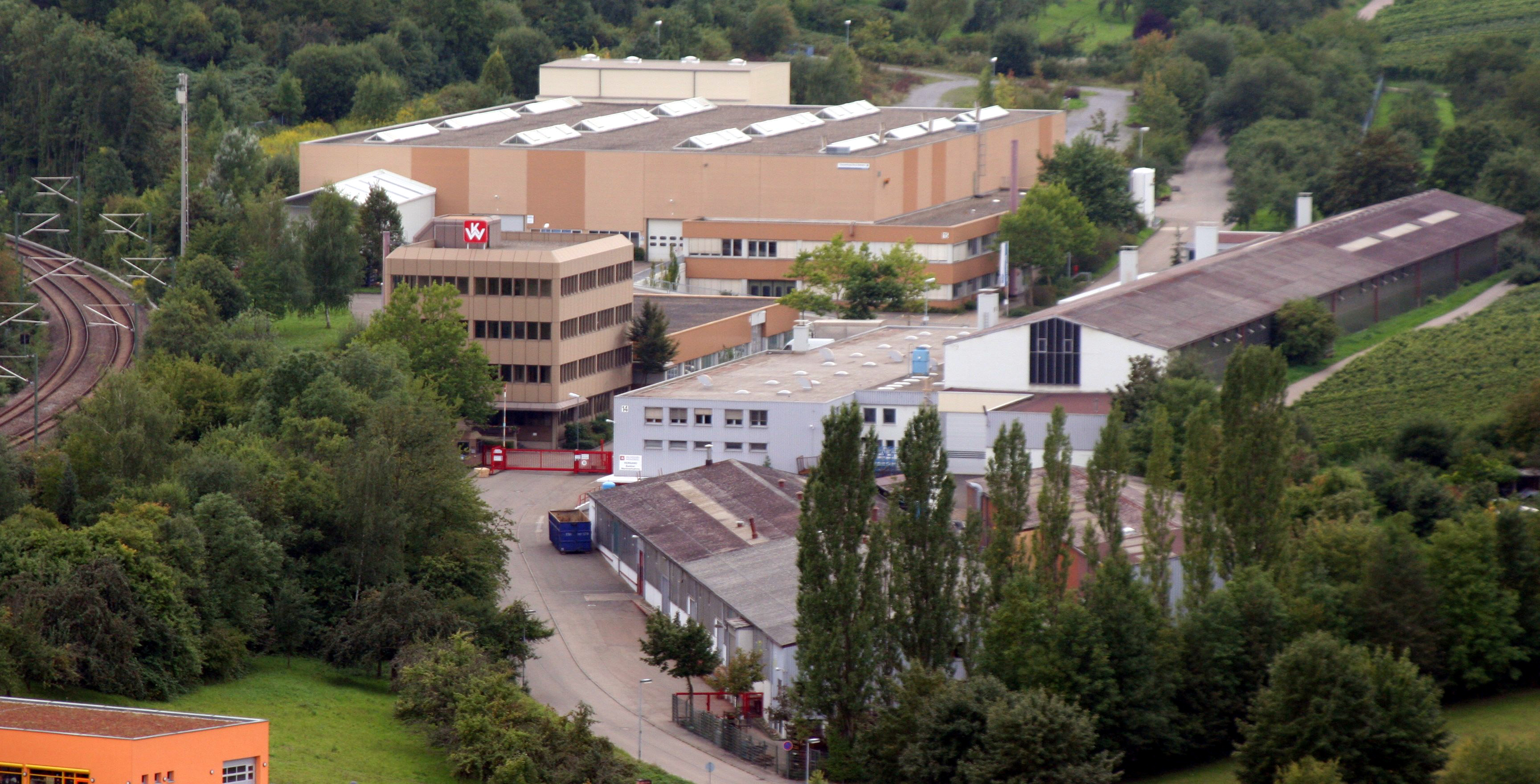
Areals of the company Weinsberg in 2006

== History ==
=== Early years ===
In 1912, the company was founded in Weinsberg by plaster master Gustav Alt, and master bricklayer Wilhelm Schuhmacher with funds of 80,000 German gold mark. In the south of the Weinsberg old town, nowadays known as Stadtseebach, a factory building was erected. First products of the new company were horse-drawn carriages manufactured by 35 hired saddlers, carpenters, and wheelwrighters using traditional design methods. Within the same year, the production of automotive coachwork started. Each body was manufactured as a custom product made of wood and leather in a way that was similar to the way the horse carriages were made. In 1913, the company generated a total revenue of 119,300 Mark. In 1914, the former copartner Franz Eisenlohr from a Reutlingen hotel operator family acquired the company.

The same year, World War I interrupted normal production. By order of the Ministry of War of Württemberg, KW produced horse-carts for military purposes. After the war, the production of these field wagons was continued; a few hundred were taken by the French Armed Forces as war reparations. Until the beginning of the World War II, military carts were delivered to the Wehrmacht.

=== Between the world wars ===
In 1920, production of automobile bodies was resumed, still being made of wood and leather. In 1922, a first office building was erected. In 1924, KW generated a profit of 340,300 Goldmark. Starting in 1925, car manufacturers urged to replace the outer wood planking on the wooden frame gradually, and change to sheet metal. Tinsmiths, carpenters, and wheelwrighters joined the saddlers. KW was one of the first coachbuilding companies that introduced this new technology. In 1925, KW got the first coachbuilding serial order from NSU Motorenwerke near Neckarsulm. In the following years, KW manufactured bodies for all leading, and many smaller car manufacturers, including Auto Union, BMW, Citroën, Daimler-Benz, Ford, Magirus, Opel, and Wanderer.

From 1930, Fiat issued large orders. In 1931, bodies for 1500 Berlin taxicab were the only products made by KW. Further major contracts enabled KW to expand; in 1937, sales increased to 3,545,600 Reichsmark.

=== Fiat subsidiary ===
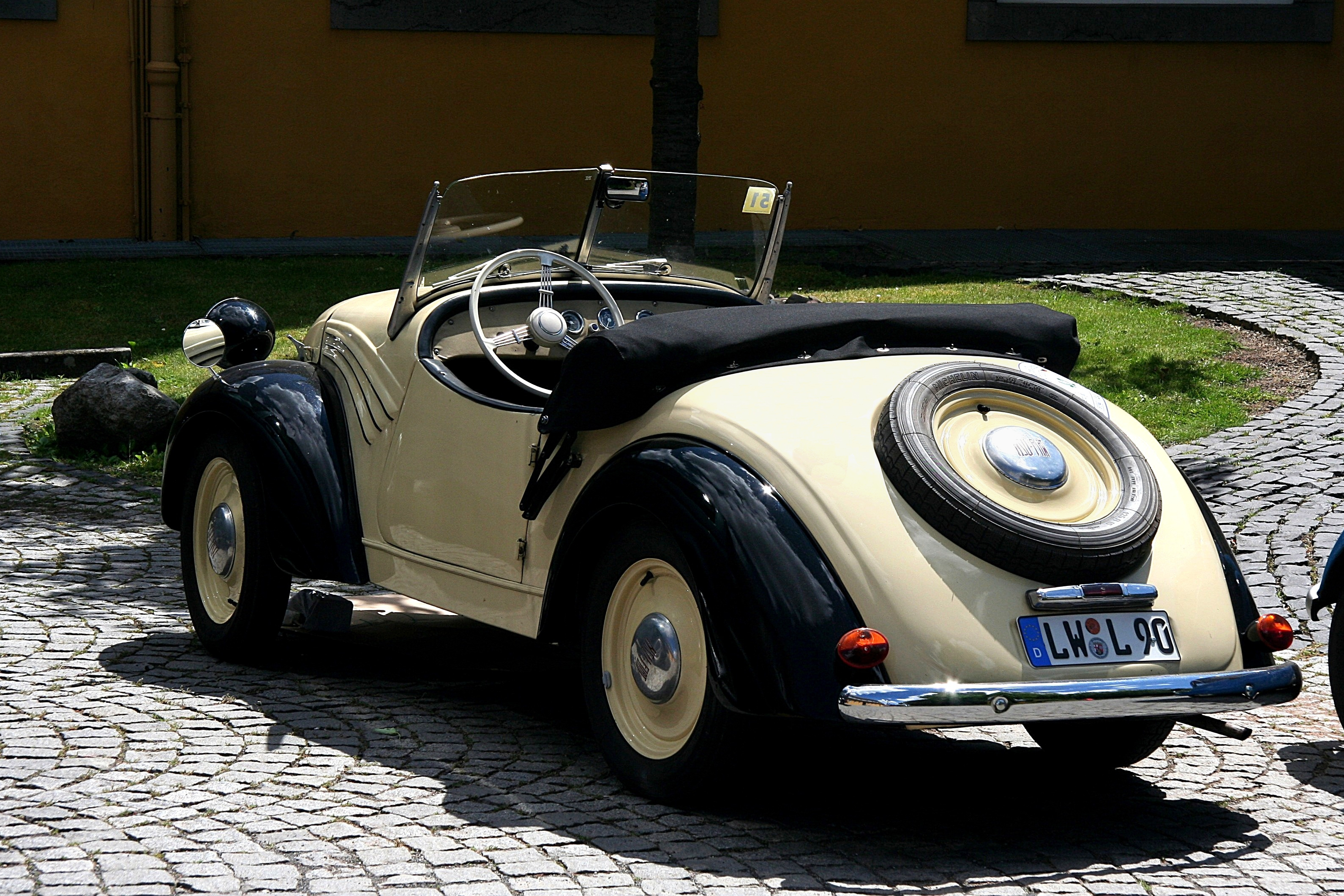
1940 NSU-Fiat Weinsberg Roadster

In 1938, owner Eisenlohr, who disagreed with the Nazi regime, sold the company to Fiat. Fiat had already acquired the Heilbronn NSU facility in 1929. KW remained as an independent company owned by Fiat. In the following years, Fiat cars like the Fiat 500 "Topolino" were manufactured in Heilbronn and Weinsberg.

In World War II, KW was forced to produce military goods. In addition to a small series of Kübelwagen, aluminium airplane parts for the Messerschmitt Me 410 and Me 262 aircraft were made.

The number of employees, declined from 729 in 1944 to 114 in 1945, correspondingly, sales decreased from 4,233,500 to 1,093,200 Reichsmark. In the years after the end of the war, goods like spoons, furniture fittings, and signs were made from the remaining aluminum; the carpenters at KW made furniture and radio casings, and farm vehicles. KW also repaired vehicles for Fiat, and the United States Army, KW also built special bodies for US Army vehicles. In 1946, the mass production of sheet metal cabins for Büssing trucks commenced. From 1950, the body for the Gutbrod Superior station wagon has been built. In the same year, the last wooden frame body of KW for a Fiat 500 C was produced. In the late 1950s and 1960s, KW built the Fiat 500 variants Fiat Neckar, Fiat Jagst, and Fiat Weinsberg (Fiat Coupe Weinsberg 500). Also, the cooperation with Porsche was continued in the 1950s; for example, thousands of sports cars were painted in Weinsberg. In 1955, the production of sunroofs, automotive accessories, fenders, interior slots, and taxi cab dividers, was started.

In 1958, KW invested in tool and fixture construction; tools had already been made for personal use at KW. In 1969, KW introduced its first self-produced well-selling vehicle, based on the Fiat 238. The brand name Weinsberg was used for KW models based on Fiat, Mercedes-Benz, and Volkswagen cars. In 1974, construction of special vehicles such as ambulances, as well as rescue and emergency vehicles followed; single samples had already been built before.

In 1970, Fiat decided to cease production in Germany and limit KW to a sales and service organization. The KW was sold to Deutsche Treuhandgesellschaft, which later joined KPMG.

=== Decline and restart ===
By the late 1980s, business went well. From 1961 to 1965, the press shop, tool and fixture construction were moved into two newly built workshops on a site next the Crailsheim–Heilbronn railway. In 1983, the remaining workshops were moved into three newly erected buildings at this site. As a result, the Weinsberg urban areal of 2.1 hectares (5.1 acres) was freed up for new use, and until 1994, residential, and commercial buildings were built after the old KW buildings had been subsequently relocated and demolished.

In October 1987, the company had a sales total of DM 85 million and 550 employees (two smaller subsidiaries in Heilbronn included). In 1988, due to a bad economic situation of the customers in the automotive industry, KW filed short-time working for several employees. In March 1988, German-American entrepreneur Heinz Prechter (American Sunroof Corporation) acquired 50% of KW; in 1989, he acquired 100% of it. However, this could not stop the company's decline.

Weinsberg Logo

In August 1992, the recreation vehicles and rescue vehicles brand Weinsberg was sold to Tabbert Industrie AG (later named Knaus Tabbert). The company specialized in manufacturing parts, as well as fixture and toolmaking. Due to a bad economic situation, after steady staff reduction, in April 2002, insolvency was filed. After more than three years, a new investor Surikate GmbH from Bad Rothenfelde had acquired the company by 1 August 2005. The number of employees declined from 454 in 1988 to 75 in 2005. The number of KW's employees rose to 85 after the entry of Surikate GmbH in 2009. On 11 March 2009, after huge losses in 2007 and 2008, and sales decline of over 60% in January 2009, KW filed insolvency again. The Bretzfeld located Wolpert Group Karosseriewerke Weinsberg acquired KW in December 2009. In 2011, KW was moved to Schwabbach, a suburb of Bretzfeld.

== Literature ==
- (German) H. Dieter Schmoll and Ingrid Bartenbach: 75 Jahre Karosseriewerke Weinsberg 1912–1987. Weinsberg, 1987
