= List of car models commercialized in Argentina =

The following is a list of car models currently for sale in Argentina.

== BMW ==
- 1 Series
- 3 Series
- 5 Series
- 6 Series
- X3
- X5
- X6
- Isetta
- 700
- 2002

== Coradir ==
- TITA
- TITO

== Ford ==
- F100
- Falcon
- Fairlane
- Taunus
- Taurus
- Laser
- 17m
- Econoline
- Mustang
- Torino
- Zephyr
- Cargo
- Anglia
- Model T
- Thunderbird
- 20m
- Capri
- Granada
- Granada (Europe)
- Aerostar
- Probe
- Puma
- Mustang (third generation)
- Sierra
- Escort
- Escort (Europe)
- Orion
- Pampa
- Corcel
- Galaxy
- Galaxy (Versailles)
- Ka
- Windstar
- Fairmont
- Pinto
- Fiesta
- Focus
- Festiva
- Mondeo
- EcoSport
- Escape
- Kuga
- S-Max
- Explorer
- Ranger
- Courier
- Transit

== American motors corporation ==
- Ambassador
- Rambler
- Spirit
- Eagle
- Pacer
- Concord

== General Motors ==
=== Chevrolet ===
- 400
- Chevy
- Corsa
- Corsa Combo
- Corsa II
- Classic
- Citation
- Tigra
- Nova
- Caprice
- Montana
- Corvair
- Celta
- El Camino
- Prisma
- Agile
- Celebrity
- Meriva
- Astra
- Zafira
- Cruze
- Vectra
- van
- Grand Vitara
- Grand Blazer
- S-10
- Monza
- luv
- Malibu
- C-20/D-20
- Camaro
- Corvette
- Corsica
- Beretta
- Lumina APV
- Veraneio
- Master
- Trailblazer
- Monza

== Honda ==
- Fit
- City
- Civic
- Accord
- Prelude
- Stream
- HRV
- CRV
- Pilot
- Acty
- Odyssey

== Mazda ==
- B series
- E3000
- B2200
- B2000
- B1600
- E2200
- RX-7
- MPV
- 323
- 626
- 929

== Hyundai ==
- Elantra
- Accent
- Tucson
- Santa Fe
- H-1
- Staria
- H-100
- Coupe
- Excel
- Mighty
- Atos
- HD
- Porter
- Veloster
- Kona
- Galloper
- Pony
- Sonata

== Kia Motors ==
- Picanto
- Cerato
- Rondo
- Magentis
- Opirus
- Sportage
- Sorento
- Combi
- Clarus
- Mohave
- Sedona
- Pride
- Rio
- Sephia
- Capital
- Avella

== Land Rover ==
- Defender
- Discovery
- Santana

== Daihatsu ==
- Charade
- Terios
- Sirion
- Cuore
- Rocky
- Feroza
- Hijet
- Wide 55
- Taft
- Applause
- Max cuore
- Charmant
- Move

== Subaru ==
- Legacy
- Outback
- Forester
- Leone
- Justy
- Brat
- 1600
- 600
- Impreza
- XV
- SVX

== Mercedes-Benz ==
- A-Class
- B-Class
- C-Class
- E-Class
- S-Class
- G-Class
- SL-Class
- SLK-Class
- W123
- W124
- W202
- W201
- MB180
- Vito
- GLK
- 280SL
- 190
- Unimog
- ML
- Sprinter

== Mitsubishi ==
- Colt
- Lancer
- Galant
- Celeste
- Sapporo
- Wira
- Outlander Sport
- Space Wagon
- Canter
- 3000 GTO
- Eclipse
- Delica
- Outlander
- Montero
- L100
- L200
- L300

== Nissan ==
- March
- Tiida
- 720
- D21
- Quest
- Vanette
- Sentra
- AD
- Bluebird
- 280Z
- Silvia
- 370Z
- Laurel
- Teana
- Maxima
- Murano
- X-Trail
- X-Terra
- Terrano
- Pathfinder
- Patrol
- NP300
- Frontier

== Renault ==
- Dauphine
- Gordini
- 4
- 5
- 6
- 9/11
- 12
- 18
- 19
- 20
- 21
- 25
- 30
- Fuego
- Torino
- Twingo
- Clio
- Sandero
- Logan
- Symbol
- Mégane
- Scénic
- Laguna
- Fluence
- Latitude
- Express
- Kangoo
- Duster
- Koleos
- Trafic
- Rodeo
- Master

== Sero electric ==
- Sero Cargo
- Sero Sedan

== Stellantis ==
=== Alfa Romeo ===
- Alfasud
- Giulietta
- Alfetta
- GTV
- Spider
- 33
- 145
- 146
- 147
- 155
- 156
- 159
- 164
- Mito
- 4C
- 8C

=== Chrysler ===
- Valiant
- Neon
- Stratus
- Caravan
- Sebring
- PT Cruiser
- Shadow
- Crossfire
- 300M
- 300

=== Citroën ===
- 2CV
- 3CV
- Ami 8
- Méhari
- Dyane
- Visa
- GSA
- CX
- AX
- ZX
- Saxo
- Xsara
- Xsara Picasso
- Xantia
- C3
- C3 Picasso
- C4
- C4 Picasso
- C4 Grand Picasso
- C5
- C6
- DS3
- C15
- Berlingo

=== Dodge ===
- 1500
- Challenger
- Polara
- Dakota
- Ram
- Ram van
- Journey
- Spirit
- Neon
- Aries
- Reliant

=== Fiat ===
- 600/770
- 800
- 1100
- 1500, Coupé
- 1600, Coupé
- 125
- 128, Europa, Super Europa
- 133
- 147, Spazio, Brio, Vivace
- Uno
- Duna
- Regatta
- Fiorino
- Palio
- Siena
- Tipo
- Tempra
- Marea
- Barchetta
- Brava
- Ritmo
- 500
- Nuevo Uno
- Punto
- Linea
- Idea
- Strada
- Qubo
- Ducato
- X1/9

=== Jeep ===
- Willys Overland
- Willys Estanciera
- Compass
- Cherokee
- Grand Cherokee
- Liberty
- Wagoneer
- Patriot
- Comanche
- Wrangler
- Commander

=== Opel ===
- K 180
- Rekord
- Astra
- Vectra
- Calibra

=== Peugeot ===
- 403
- 404
- 504
- 604
- 205
- 305
- 405
- 505
- 605
- 106
- 206
- 306
- 406
- 207 Compact
- 207
- 307
- 407
- 607
- 308
- 408
- 3008
- 5008
- RCZ
- Hoggar
- Partner
- Expert
- Boxer

== Suzuki ==
- Cervo
- Alto
- Fun
- Swift
- Baleno
- LJ80
- Jimny
- Samurai
- Vitara
- Grand Vitara
- Wagon R
- Grand Vitara JIII
- Carry

== Toyota ==
- Corolla
- Prius
- Carina
- Celica
- Yaris
- Etios
- Tercel
- Corona
- Avensis
- Camry
- Cressida
- RAV4
- 4Runner
- Hilux
- Hilux SW4
- Land Cruiser
- Land Cruiser Prado
- FJ Cruiser
- LiteAce
- GR86
- C-HR
- Coaster
- Starlet
- Crown
- tiara
- Hiace
- Previa

== Volkswagen ==
=== Audi ===
- 80
- 100
- 200
- A1
- A3
- A3 Sportback
- A4
- A5
- A6
- A4
- RS4
- S3
- S5
- Q5
- Q7
- TT
- R8

=== Volkswagen ===
- Beetle
- Brasília
- 1500
- Passat
- Kombi
- Gacel
- Senda
- Carat
- Gol
- Santana/Quantum
- Polo Classic
- Golf
- Bora
- Caddy
- New Beetle
- Fox
- CrossFox
- Suran
- Voyage
- Vento
- Passat CC
- Scirocco
- Saveiro
- Sharan
- Tiguan
- Touareg
- Transporter
- T4 Multivan

Volkswagen's Gacel, Senda, Fox, Saveiro, Suran and Voyage are based on Volkswagen Gol platforms

== VOLT Motors ==
- e1
- w1
- z1
