= Generations of Hyundai Staria =

The generations of Hyundai Staria are:

- Van Hyundai H100 is first generation
- Hyundai H-1 the second generation
- Hyundai Staria the third generation
