= Fiat Fiorino =

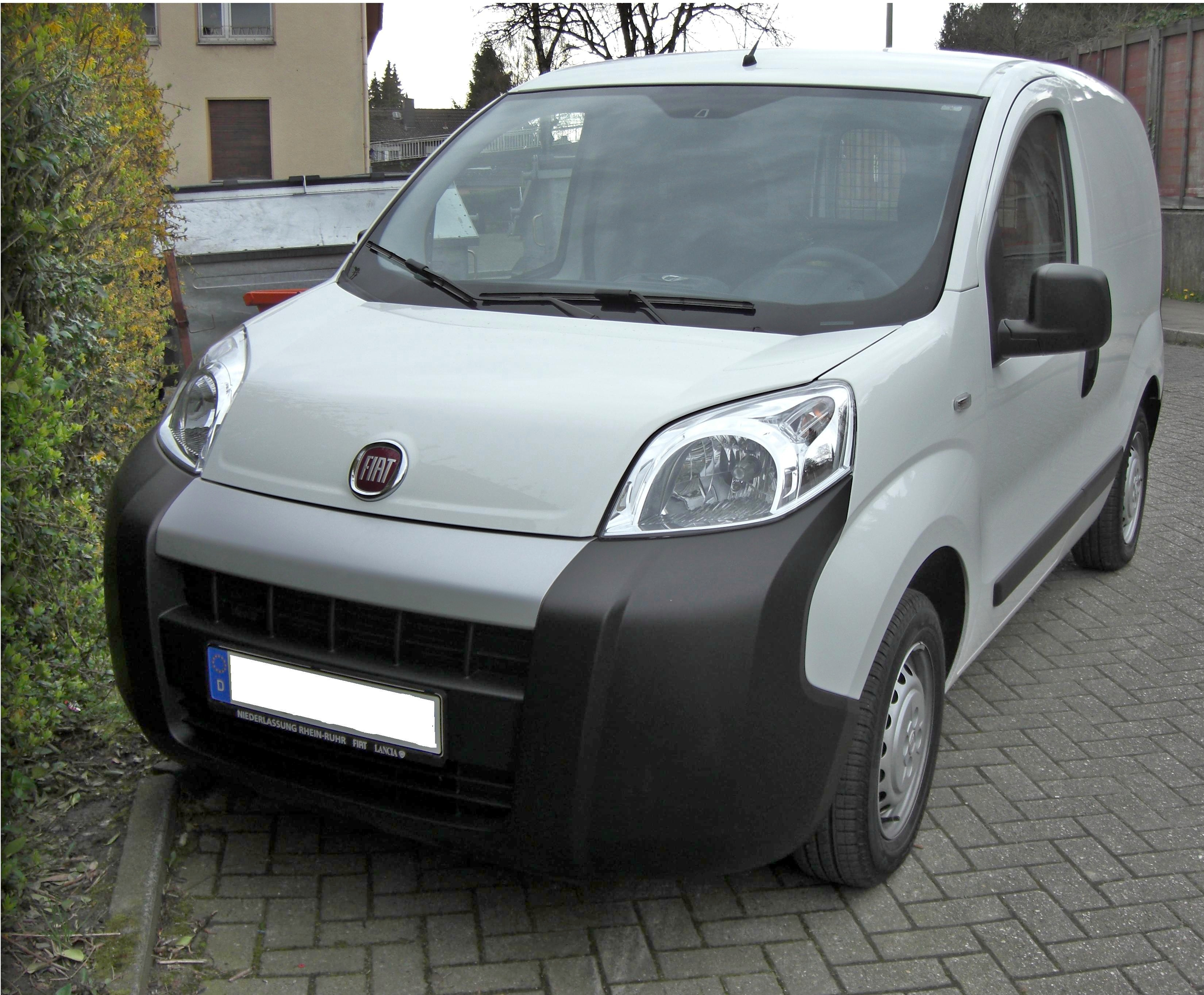
- Fiat Fiorino 2008

Overview
- Manufacturer: Fiat
- Production: 1977–2024; 1980–present (Latin America)

Body and chassis
- Class: Panel van Pickup; Leisure activity vehicle

Chronology
- Predecessor: Fiat 500 Commerciale/Furgoncino

The Fiat Fiorino is a small commercial vehicle produced by the Italian car manufacturer Fiat since 1977. Its first two generations have been the panel van derivatives of other small models, such as the Fiat 127 and Fiat Uno, while the current third generation was developed jointly with PSA Peugeot Citroën (both of which merged into Stellantis), and is based on the Fiat Small platform.

The current generation, the Sevel LAV, is also built with a passenger body style, as the Fiat Qubo, and is marketed along with its rebadged versions, the Citroën Nemo and the Peugeot Bipper. It is positioned below the Fiat Doblò, the Citroën Berlingo, and the Peugeot Partner, in each manufacturer's model line up.

The name comes from the fiorino d'oro, an old Italian coin normally translated into English as the Florin.

== First generation (1977–1988) ==
First generation (147)
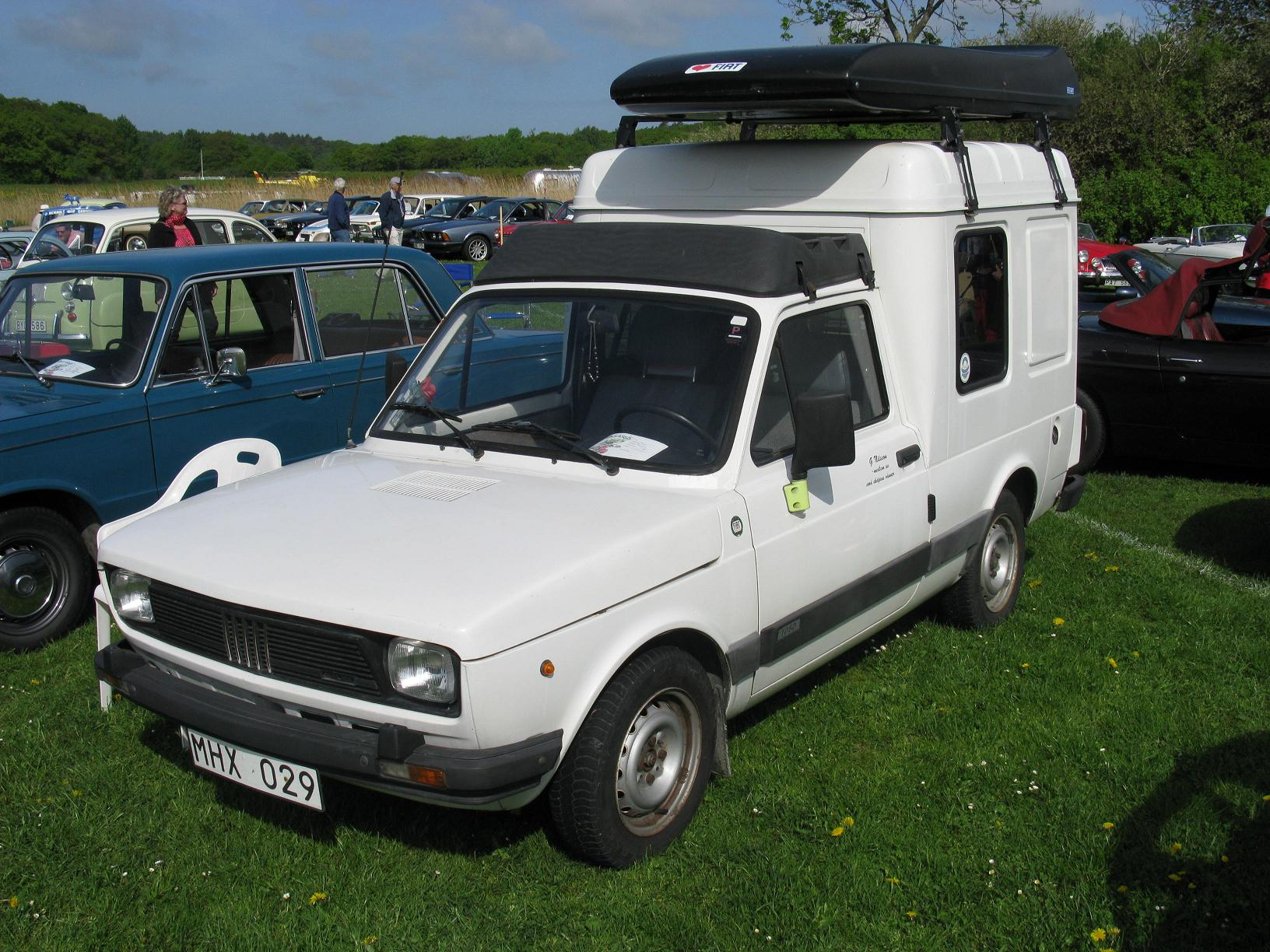
- Fiorino van, original 127-based design

Overview
- Also called: Fiat 127 Fiorino; Fiat 147 Pick-Up/City (Brazil); Emelba 127 Poker
- Production: 1977–1988; 1989–1995 (Argentina)
- Assembly: Mirafiori, Turin, Italy; Betim, Brazil (Fiat Automóveis); Córdoba, Argentina (Sevel); Catalonia, Spain (Emelba)

Body and chassis
- Layout: Front-engine, front-wheel-drive
- Related: Fiat 127; Fiat 147

Powertrain
- Engine: Petrol: 903 cc 100 GL.000 OHV I4; 1049 cc 127 A.000 OHC I4; 1297 cc Fiasa OHC I4 (BR); 1301 cc 128 OHC I4 (RA); 1372 cc Tipo OHC I4 (RA); Diesel: 1301 cc 127 A5.000 OHC I4

Dimensions
- Wheelbase: 2,225 mm (87.6 in)
- Length: 3,835 mm (151.0 in)
- Width: 1,564 mm (61.6 in)
- Height: 1,810 mm (71.3 in)
- Curb weight: 870 kg (1,918 lb)

Originally called Fiat 127 Fiorino, the first generation (Codeproject Type 147) was based on the Series 2 Fiat 127 with the back being a van box, i.e. a 1.3 metres (4 ft 3 in) tall "high cube" design, an arrangement subsequently emulated by several European automakers. The platform is a stretched version of the Brazilian 147 with a different rear suspension.

It was launched in early November 1977 as a panel van with the same 903 cc (100 GL.000) OHV inline-four petrol engine as used in the Fiat 127. In March 1979 the 1050 cc OHC Fiasa engine was added, as was the glazed passenger version (Panorama). 1979 was also when right-hand drive production began, enabling sales in the United Kingdom and other nations that drive on the left. British buyers were only offered the larger 1.05-litre engine.

In 1981 Mirafiori production came to an end, bringing with it a change to the front appearance of most European-market Fiorinos. The car now received the 147's taller front sheetmetal with an additional air intake beneath the grille rather than the original 127's design. The Italian-made 903 cc engine was dropped, while the new 1301 cc (127 D.000) SOHC diesel engine was introduced. While the Brazilian 147 passenger version received a facelift with square headlights (called "Europa"), the Fiorino largely soldiered on with the original sheetmetal. The Pick-up City and better equipped versions of the Fiorino van used the new Europa front beginning in 1982.

For right-hand drive markets, the Fiorino kept the original 127 underpinnings and design. These cars were available only as vans, with either a flat roof or with the "Hi-Top" roof and were built by Bertone, who was also assembling the X1/9 and the Ritmo Cabriolet for Fiat. The 127-series Fiorino received a light facelift in 1985, including Fiat's five-bar grille, the Ducato's wing mirrors, and a five-speed manual transmission. Production ended in late 1987, still using the original sheetmetal with quarterlights in the front doors.

After the standard car version of the 127 was replaced by the Uno in 1983, Fiat dropped the "127" portion of the name in Europe, and called the vehicle simply Fiorino. In September 1980, the Fiorino was launched in Brazil, based on the locally built Fiat 147, and fitted with its 1.3-liter engine. It was initially available as a van only, in either panelled or glazed form, and had a payload of 420 kg (926 lb). Fiat had already been offering a pick-up using the 147's shorter bodywork since late 1978 ("147 Pickup", available with the 1050 or the 1300 engine), but in 1981 this was changed over to the longer Panorama/Fiorino chassis. The longer pick-up was available as a standard version, and from 1982 also as the better equipped 147 City, which received the square forward leaning headlights of the 1981 facelift model. Another facelift was launched in 1983, with the new front grille based on the South American Fiat 127/147 Unificata. In South America, this new front was only gradually introduced as some lower cost versions retained the original design until 1986.

From 1982 Brazilian Fiorino buyers could choose from at least four versions of the high cube design. The Furgão was a two-seater panel van, the Vetrato was a glazed two-seater van, and the new Combinata received removable facing benches (seating six additional passengers with a minimum of comfort) at the rear. These three versions all received a cargo divider, unlike the Settegiorni which was a station wagon with seating for five. This was also new for 1982 and was the equivalent of the European Fiorino Panorama/Combi model.

In Europe, Fiat sold the Ognitempo kit to transform the Fiorino into a camper.

=== Production ===
The Fiorino was assembled from 1977 to 1981 in the Mirafiori factory in Turin, Italy, alongside the Fiat 127. In 1980, production began in the Minas Gerais plant, Brazil where the Fiat 147 (and related 127 Panorama) were manufactured. In 1981, production for the European market was transferred from Mirafiori to Minas Gerais. Cars for right-hand drive markets (and some other European markets) were built by Bertone until late 1987, using the original 127 front design.

After Brazilian production ceased in 1988, the tooling was transferred to Argentina. The Fiorino continued to be manufactured by Sevel Argentina from August 1989 as a van or pickup and sold for the local market. The Argentinian cars were equipped with a locally made 1.3-liter petrol engine (a version of the Fiat 128 SOHC engine) or the Brazilian-made 1.3 diesel with 60 and 45 hp (44 and 33 kW) respectively. The petrol engine was later replaced with a low compression, low octane version of the more modern 1.4-liter engine as also seen in the Spazio/Vivace. 25,035 units of the first generation Fiorino were built in the Córdoba factory between 1989 and 1995, and a total of 250,545 units of the Fiorino were built in the Betim factory in Brazil between 1980 and 1988. Of these, 172,086 were vans and 78,459 were pick-up versions respectively. The pick-up was very successful in Brazil's home market, with over three quarters of the production staying at home while nearly 90 percent of the Fiorino vans built went to export, mainly to Europe.

=== Spanish version ===
In Spain, a commercial vehicle based on the SEAT 127 (a Spanish version of the Italian 127 built under license Fiat by SEAT) was produced from 1980 by coachbuilder Emelba and called the Emelba 127 Poker.

The 127 Poker has a similar "high cube" box design of the Fiorino, but different rear doors, rear lights, and rear suspension. The 127 Poker was designed by Elba Design studio and was available as a panel van, passenger version, and coupe utility (pick up). It was fitted with the 903-cc Fiat petrol engine and was sold directly through SEAT dealerships in Spain.

Production ended in 1986 when it was replaced by the Panda-based SEAT Terra, which shares its engine with the SEAT 127. The Spanish 127 Poker was built at the headquarters of Emelba in Girona, Catalonia.

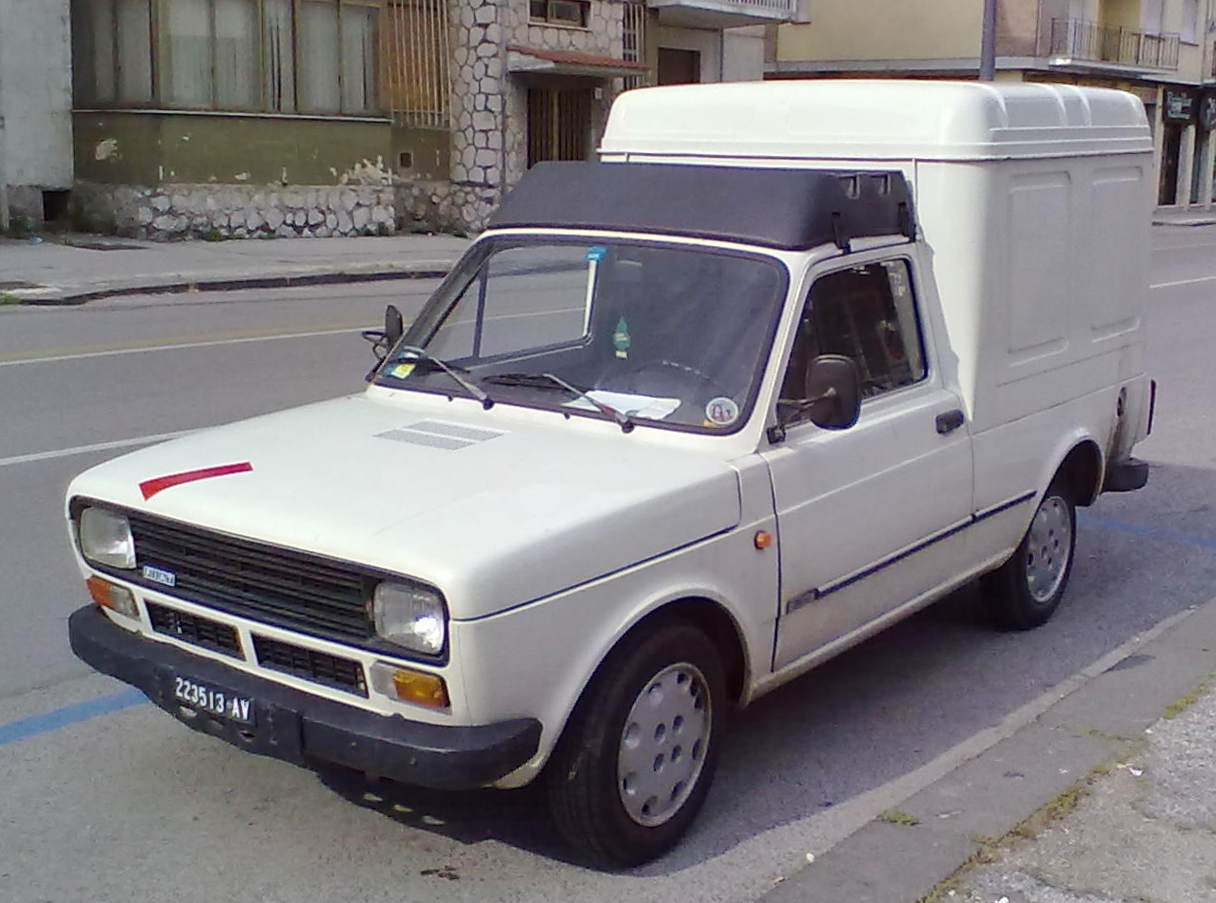
Fiat Fiorino Hi-Top Van, 147-based model (1981-1983)

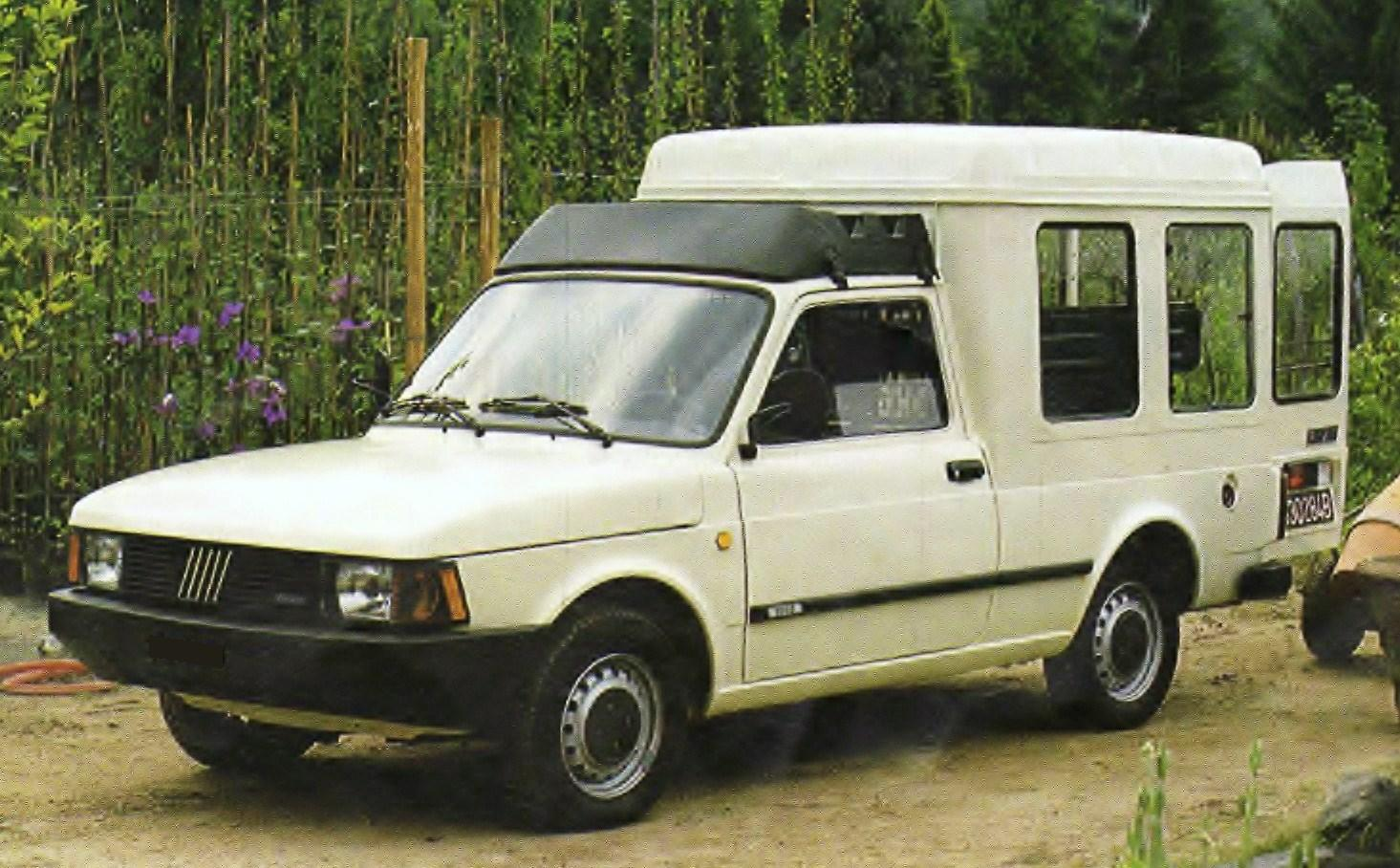
1983 Fiat Fiorino Combinata, Unificata design

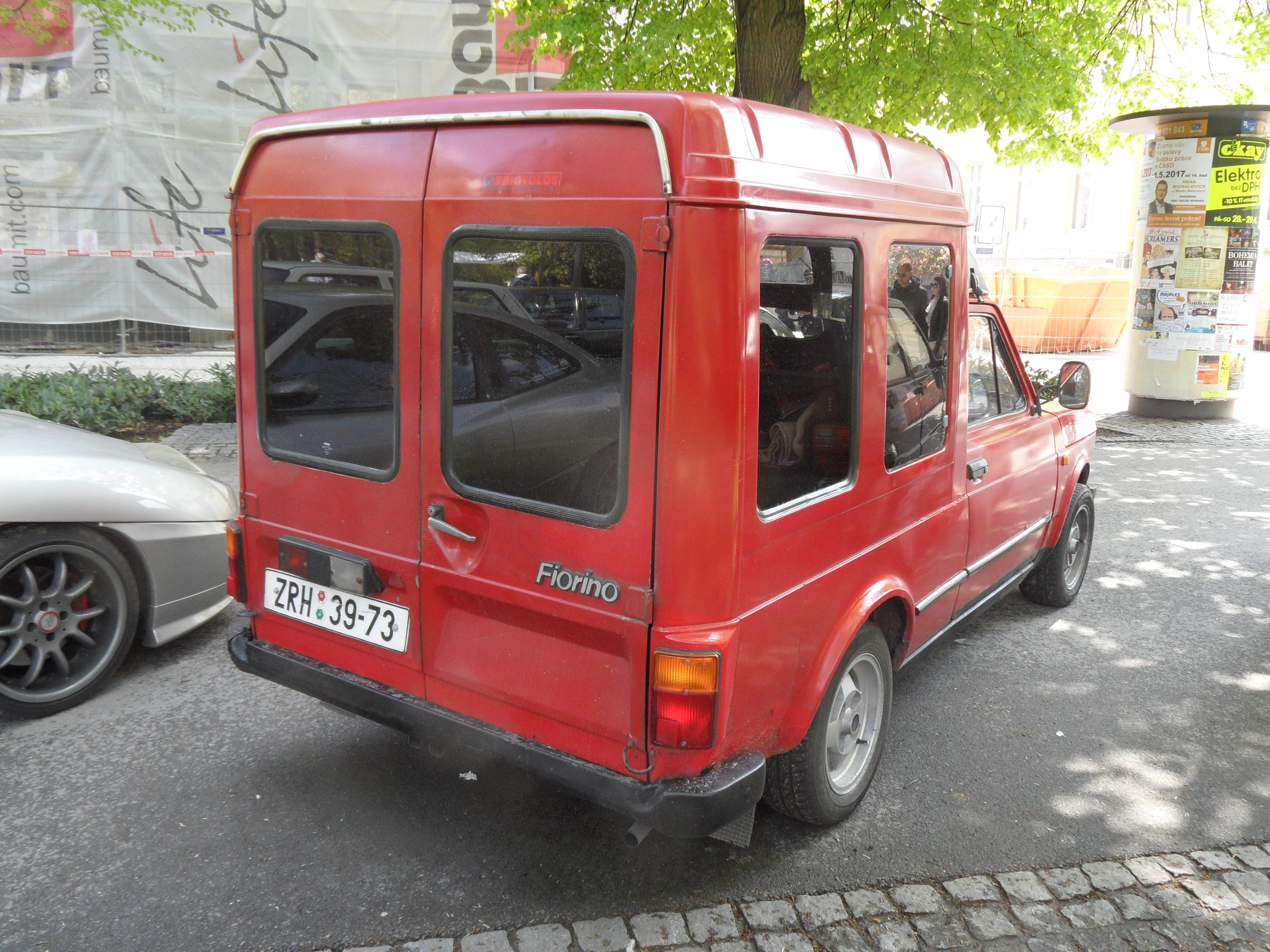
Fiat Fiorino Combi, rear view

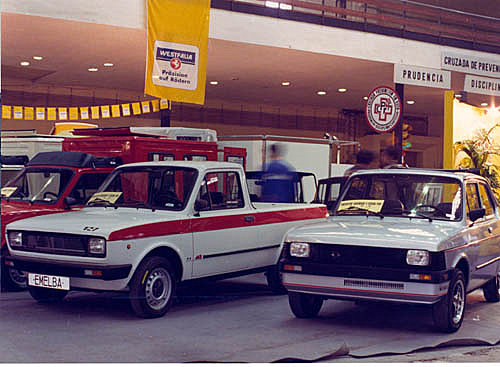
Emelba 127 Poker pick up (on the left)

=== Engines ===
Engines used in Fiorino (first generation)

Model	Engine	Displacement	Power	Torque	Production period
0.9 OHV 8V petrol	I4	903 cc	45 hp (33 kW)	64 N⋅m (47 lb⋅ft)	1977.11 – mid-1981
1.05 OHC 8V petrol	I4	1049 cc	50 hp (37 kW)	77 N⋅m (57 lb⋅ft)	1979.03 – e / a / rly 1988
1.3 OHC 8V petrol/ethanol	I4	1297 cc	57–61 hp (42–45 kW)	96–97 N⋅m (71–72 lb⋅ft)	1980.09 – ea / rly 1988
1.3 OHC 8V petrol	I4	1301 cc	60 hp (44 kW)	94 N⋅m (69 lb⋅ft)	1989.08 – 19 / 91
1.4 OHC 8V petrol	I4	1372 cc	61 hp (45 kW)	98 N⋅m (72 lb⋅ft)	1991 – 1995
1.3 OHC 8V diesel	I4	1301 cc	45 hp (33 kW)	76 N⋅m (56 lb⋅ft)	1981 / – early 1988, 19 / 89. / 08 – 1995

Key
Italy
Italy + Brazil
Brazil
Argentina

== Second generation (1988–2014) ==
Second generation (146)
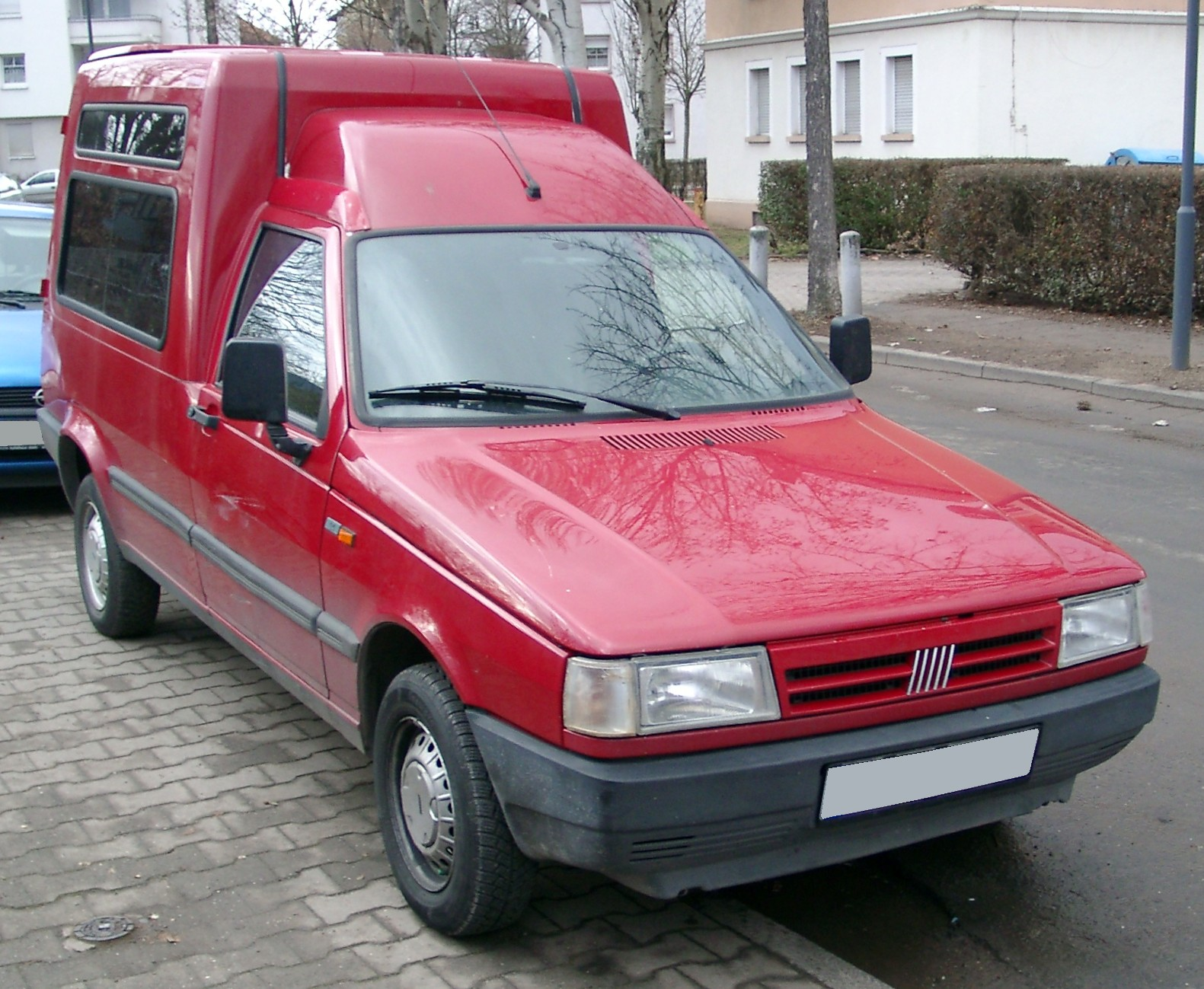
- Fiat Fiorino Panorama (phase III)

Overview
- Also called: Fiat Premio Pickup (Venezuela); Fiat Uno Pickup (Brazil)
- Production: 1988–2013; 1995–2014 (Argentina)
- Assembly: Betim, Brazil (Fiat Automóveis); Córdoba, Argentina (Sevel); Manta, Ecuador (Noboa / Coenansa)

Body and chassis
- Body style: panel van pick-up
- Layout: Front-engine, front-wheel-drive
- Platform: Type One
- Related: Fiat Uno/Mille (146); Fiat Duna/Penny/Elba

Powertrain
- Engine: Petrol: 999 cc FIRE I4; 1108 cc FIRE I4; 1116 cc 146 A6.000 I4; 1301 cc 146 A5.000 I4; 1368 cc FIRE Evo flexyfuel I4; 1497 cc 149 C1.000 I4; 1581 cc 128 series I4; Diesel: 1697 cc 146 B2.000 I4
- Transmission: 4-speed manual 5-speed manual

Dimensions
- Wheelbase: 2,365 mm (93.1 in) (1988–1994); 2,580 mm (101.6 in) (post-1994)
- Length: 3,949 mm (155.5 in) (1988–1992); 4,160 mm (163.8 in) (post-1994)
- Width: 1,555 mm (61.2 in) (1988–1992); 1,620 mm (63.8 in) (post-1994)
- Height: 1,893 mm (74.5 in) (1988–1992); 1,920 mm (75.6 in) (post-1994)
- Kerb weight: 950–1,025 kg (2,094–2,260 lb)

Chronology
- Successor: Fiat Doblò (Europe); Fiat Strada (pick-up)

In 1987, the second generation version (project code: Type 146) was released, based on the Brazilian Uno-derived Fiat Duna sedan. While similar in appearance to the European Uno, the Duna had a more robust chassis and was more suitable as the basis for a commercial vehicle. The new Fiorino was available in panel van (Fiorino Cargo), passenger (Fiorino Panorama), and pickup body styles. European sales commenced in 1988. In Venezuela, the pickup version was sold as the Premio Pickup, linking it to the related sedan model. The original pickup version (1988-1992) was sold as the Uno Pickup in Brazil but later joined the Fiorino lineup.

The Fiorino sold over 250,000 units in the European market by the end of 2000. The Fiorino ceased to be imported to the United Kingdom in 2001, a year after production for European export had ceased.

The original engines available were the 1301 cc Fiasa petrol engine, producing 50 kW (68 hp), and the 1.7-liter diesel with 44 kW (60 hp). In 1989 the Brazilian-made Fiorino became the first vehicle to be fitted with a new 1.5-liter derivative of the long running Fiasa engine. This undersquare engine produces 67.2 hp (49.4 kW) and 118 N⋅m (87 lb⋅ft) at the time of introduction. In Europe, this was also available with a three-way catalyst and fuel injection, a version which produced 55 kW (75 hp) at 5600 rpm.

Continental European buyers could also get the 128-based 1.1-litre engine, producing 40 kW (54 hp) at 5500 rpm. In European markets, the phase I Fiorino pickup was only available with the diesel engine.

=== First facelift (phase II) ===
In 1992, a facelifted Fiorino debuted with styling inspired by the Fiat Tipo. It also received a re-engineered platform, a new interior, and optional cleaner engines. The diesel was modified with a new induction system and injector pump, making for smoother running and cleaner emissions at the cost of a small power loss - down two horsepower, to 43 kW (58 hp). Catalyzed versions received a marginally smaller fuel tank, at 52 L (13.7 US gal) rather than 54 L (14.3 US gal), to provide space for the converter.

=== Second facelift (phase III) ===
In 1994, a new version based on the Fiat Mille platform debuted. While the front design remained initially unchanged, it sat on a longer wheelbase and the new rear side panels had single side windows (or single blank pressings) rather than the multiple divisions of the original model. The gas cap was now covered by an integrated flap, rather than being exposed as before. European-market diesels now received exhaust gas recirculation to meet new emissions standards, although power remained at 43 kW (58 hp). Petrol versions received the 1.4-liter "Tipo" engine, although Brazilian buyers were also offered the option of a one-liter model to suit that country's tax structure. The one-liter engine produces 41.3 kW (56.1 hp) at 6000 rpm, providing a top speed of 138 km/h (86 mph) and a 500 kg (1,102 lb) payload. The catalyzed 1.4-liter engine, as sold in Europe, develops 50 kW (68 hp).

The phase III version was assembled in the Minas Gerais plant and remained on sale in Brazil, Paraguay, Argentina, and Chile until the end of 2013, in anticipation of the requirement for dual SRS airbags and ABS brakes in the Brazilian market from 2014 onwards. The last facelift for the European market included a grille without a horizontal bar and took place in 1997. The phase III Fiorinos received another new grille for 2001, which was updated again in 2002 as Fiat's five-bar logo was replaced with the new centenary, wreath-style logo.

ABS and driver SRS airbag had been available as extra-cost options for the second generation Fiorino from the end of 1998 to 2001, but since the dashboard could not fit a passenger airbag without extensive changes, it was more cost-effective to phase it out and replace it with a newer model.

The second-generation Fiorino was also assembled in Argentina by Sevel Argentina. Over 1,000,000 Fiorinos have been sold in South America.

=== Third facelift (phase IV) ===
In 2004, a facelifted version was released with the Fiat Doblò front style. In 2009, Fiat introduced a new version with the red Fiat logo on the front.

Brazilian production of the second generation of Fiorino ended in December 2013 when the new generation (based on the platform of the new Brazilian Fiat Uno) was unveiled. The Fiorino had been the leader of the segment in Brazil for 23 consecutive years. A total of 981,922 Fiorinos was built in Betim, Brazil: 775,620 Cargo/Panorama and 206,302 pick-ups.

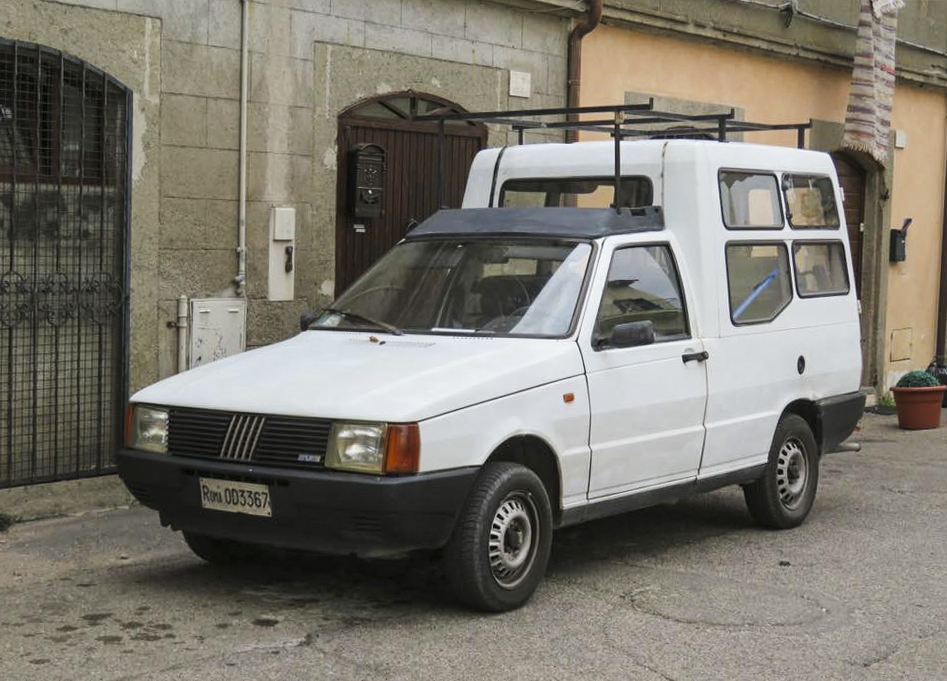
Pre-facelift Fiorino Panorama (phase I)

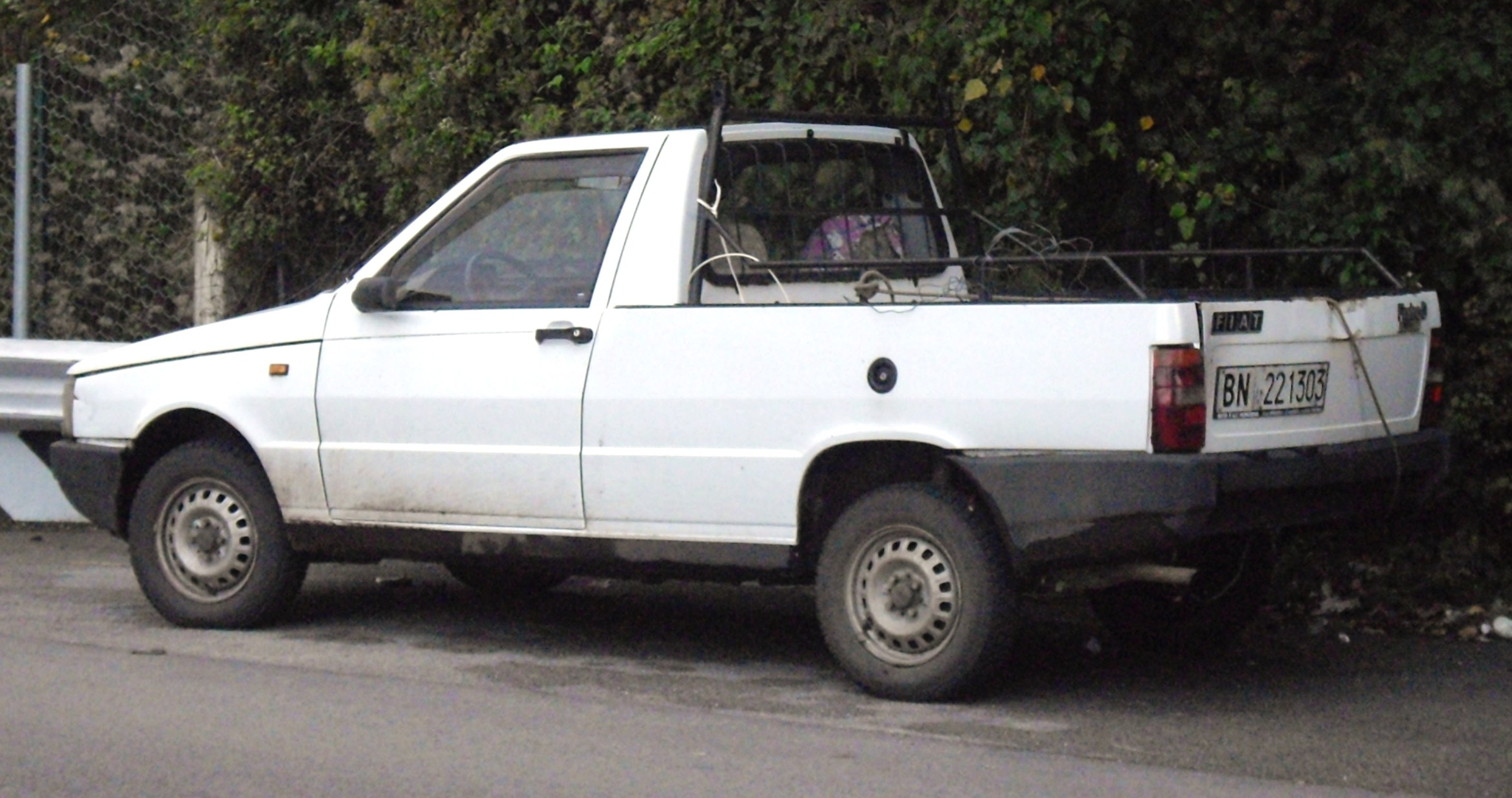
Phase I Fiorino pickup; note exposed fuel cap

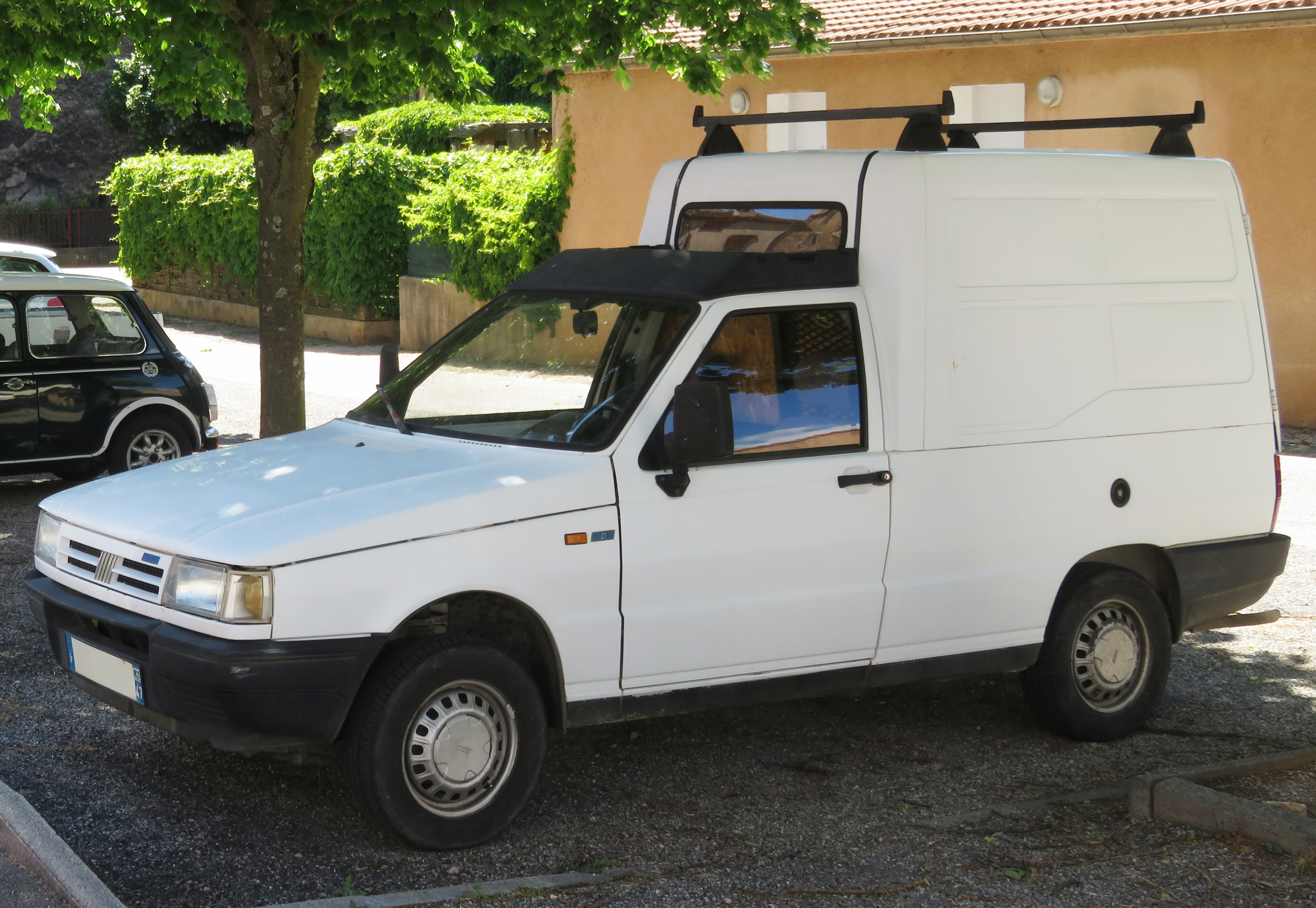
1993 Fiorino Van (Phase II; original rear design and facelift front)

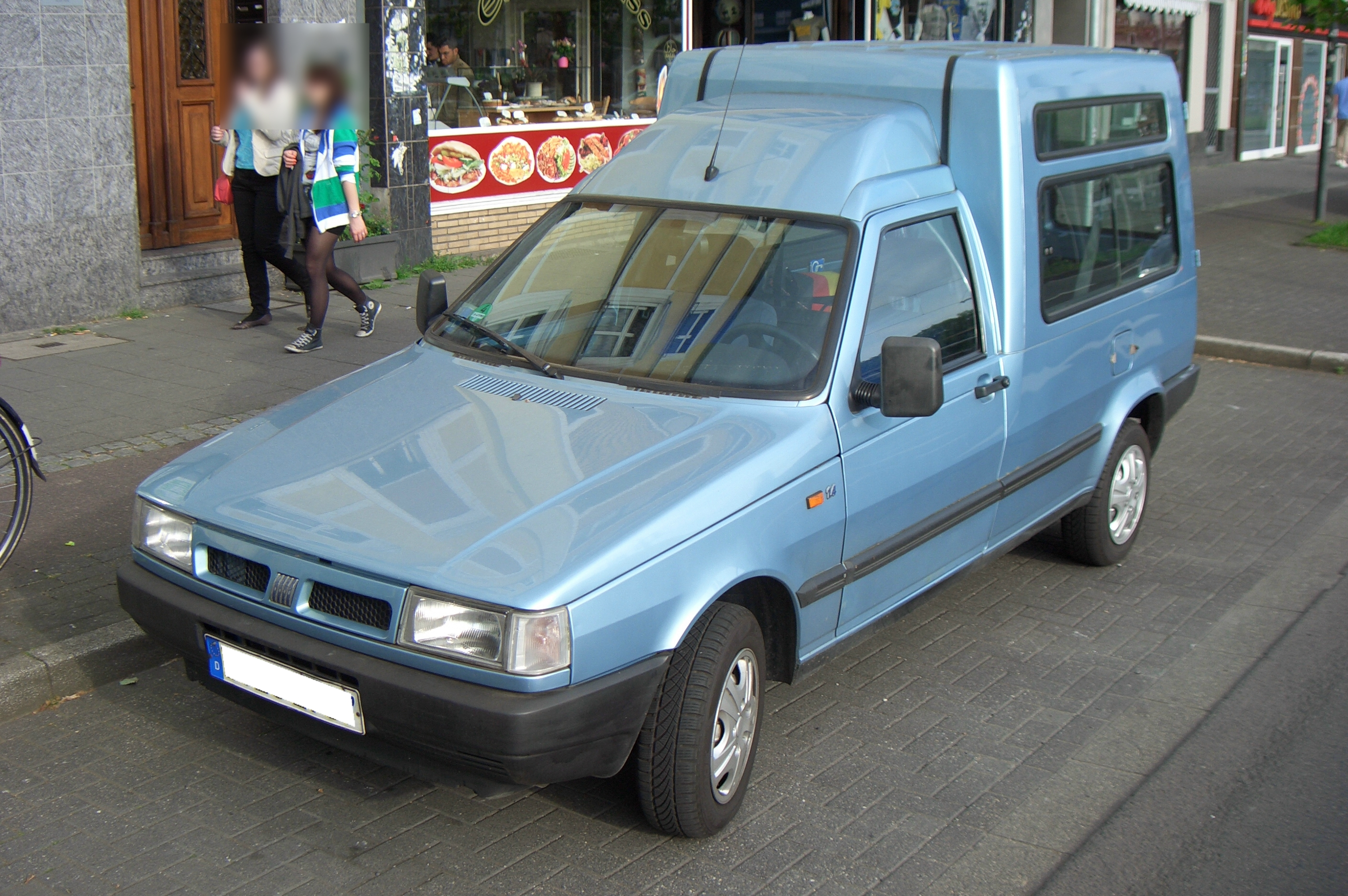
The 1997-2001 facelift version of the Fiorino Panorama (phase III)

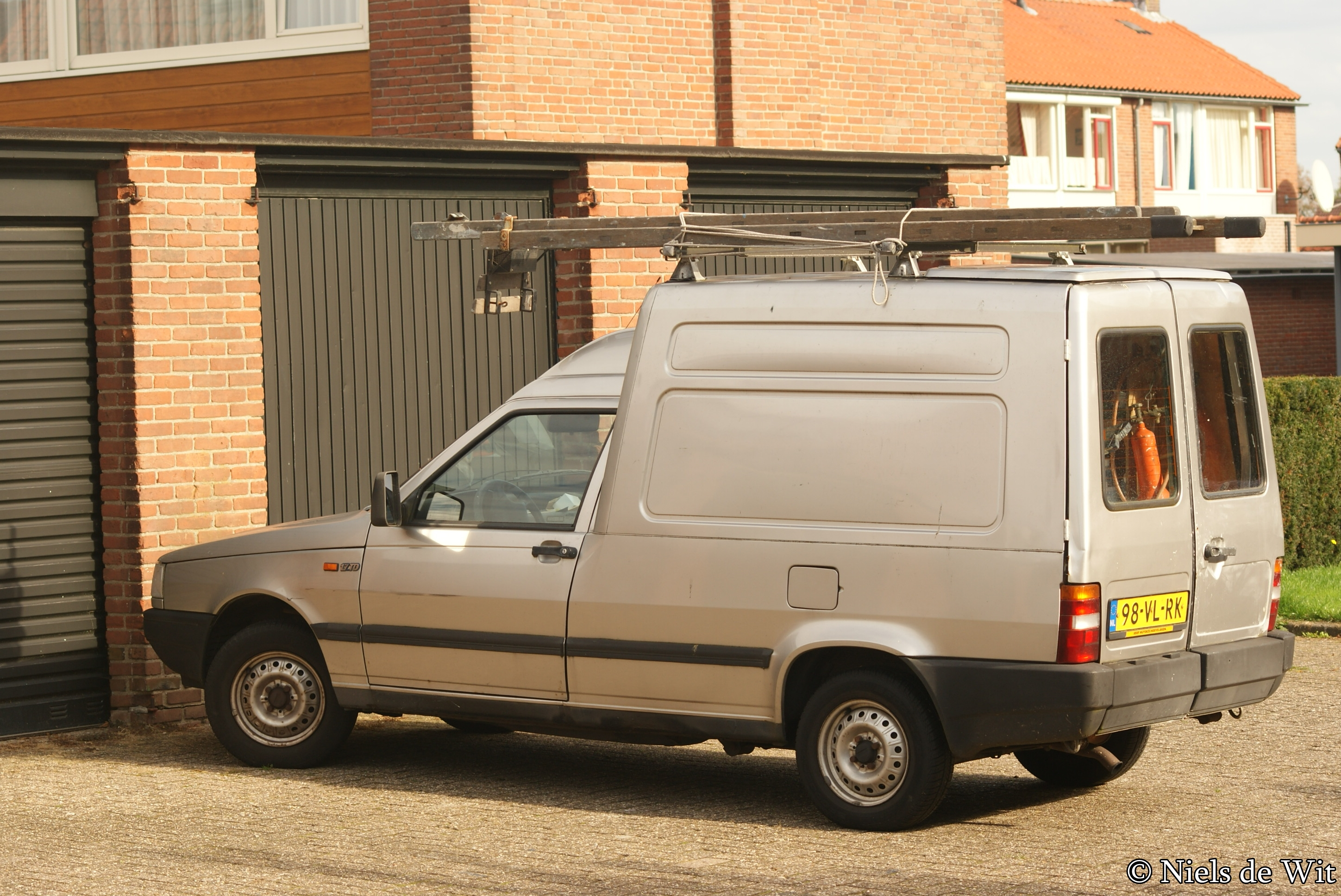
1999 Fiat Fiorino panel van (phase IIIa), rear view

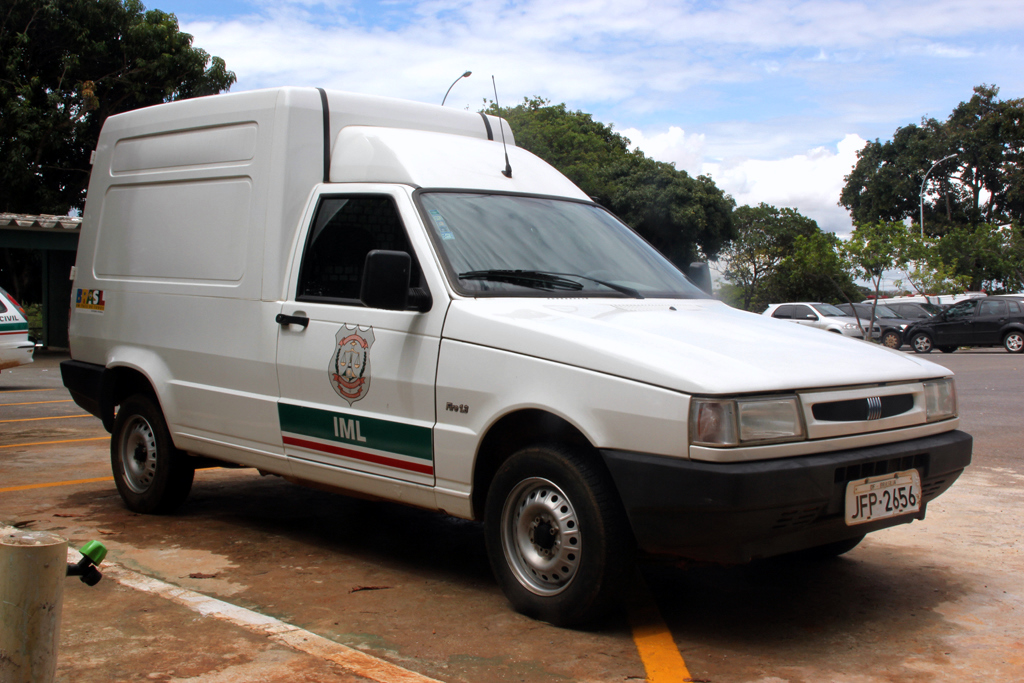
Brazilian-market Fiorino phase IIIb, 2001-2004 facelift model with new grille

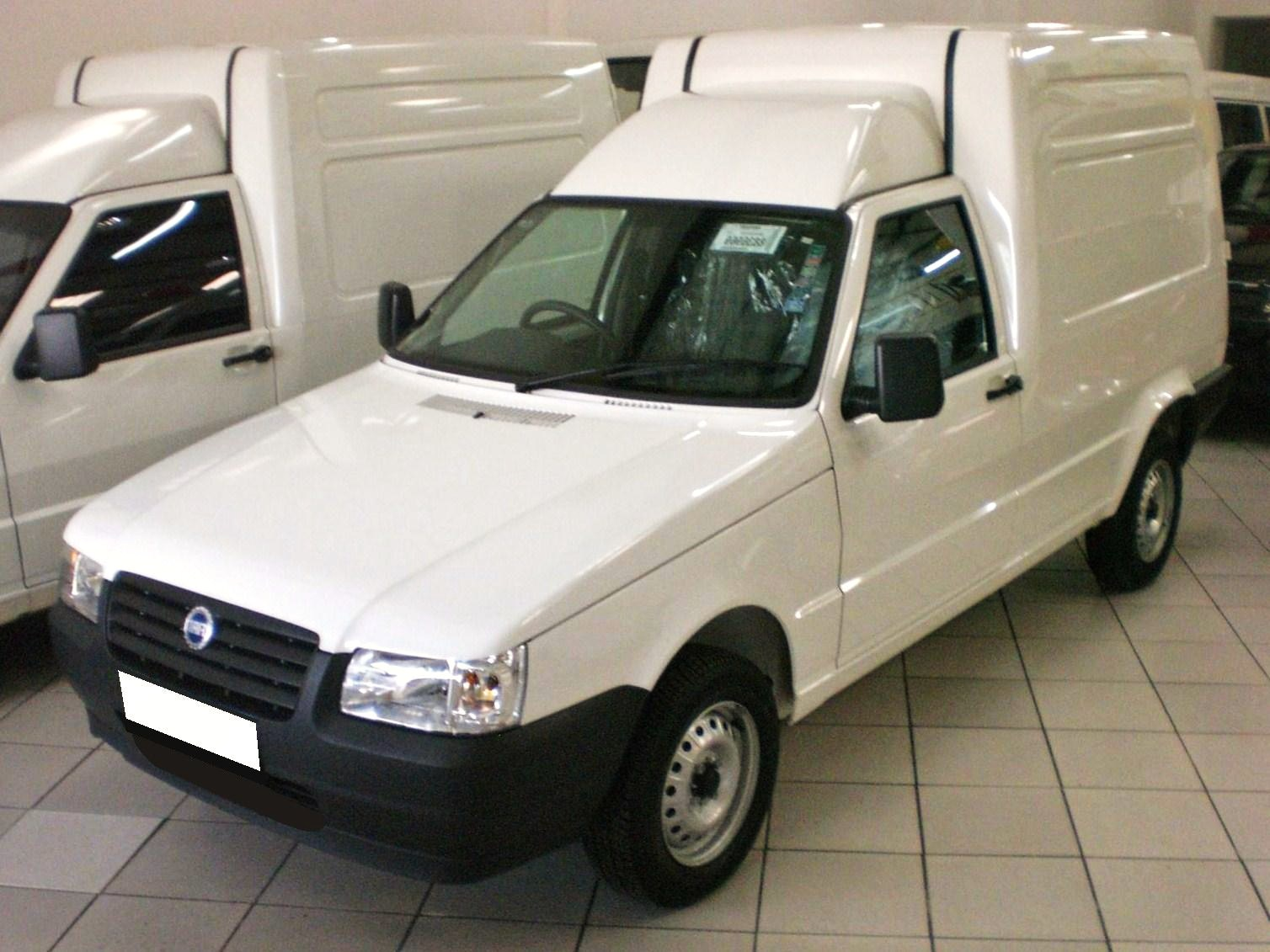
2008 Fiat Fiorino Cargo, Brazilian version (phase IV)

=== Engines ===
Available engines were the Fiat 1.7 L 8V diesel (naturally aspirated or turbocharged), the 1.3-litre "Fiasa" engine, the 1.2 L and the 1.4 L 8V Fire, and for South America, the Fiasa Flex 1.0 L and 1.5 L 8V. In Brazil, both versions of the later 1242 cc engines were available with flexible fuel technology.

- 1.0 L petrol
- 1.2 L Fire petrol
- 1.4 L petrol
- 1.5 L flex fuel (spi and mpi versions)
- 1.7 L diesel and turbodiesel

== Third generation (2007–present) ==
=== Europe (2007–2024) ===
Third generation (225)
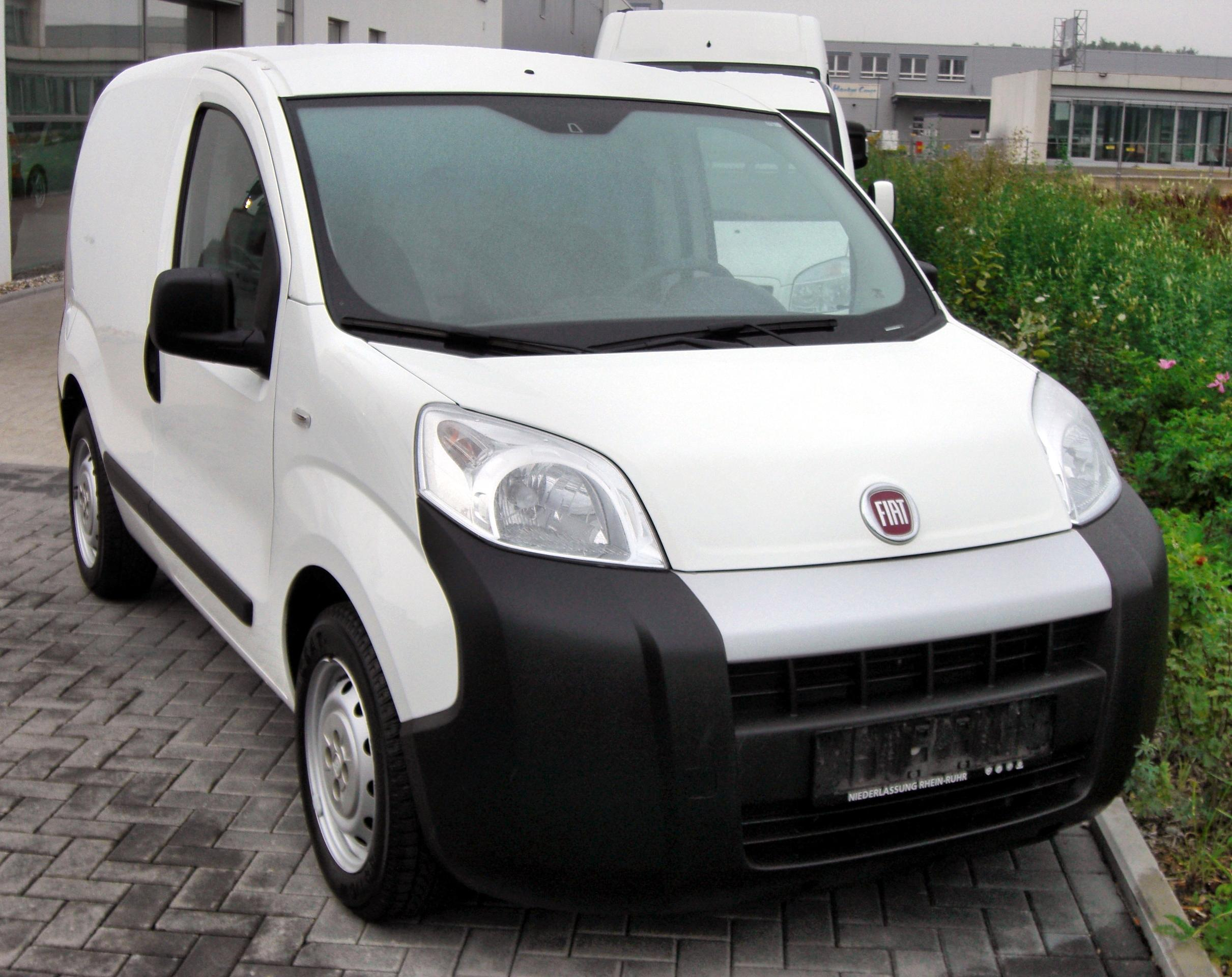
- Fiat Fiorino, one of the three versions of the Sevel LAV

Overview
- Also called: Fiat Fiorino Professional (world-wide); Fiat Fiorino Qubo; Fiat Fiorino Panorama (Turkey); Fiat Fiorino Premio (Turkey); Fiat Qubo (passenger van; except Turkey) ); Citroën Nemo; Citroën Nemo Multispace; Citroën Nemo Enterprise (United Kingdom); Peugeot Bipper; Peugeot Bipper Tepee; Ram V700 City (Chile)
- Production: 2007–2024; 2008–2017 (Citroen Nemo and Peugeot Bipper); 2008–2024 (Fiat Qubo)
- Model years: 2008–2020 (Fiat Qubo; but for some regions only)
- Assembly: Turkey: Bursa (Tofaş)
- Designer: Flavio Manzoni

Body and chassis
- Body style: 5-door panel van 5-door MPV (Qubo); 5-door passenger van
- Layout: Front-engine, front-wheel-drive
- Platform: FCA Small platform
- Related: Fiat Grande Punto; Fiat Linea; Opel Corsa D

Powertrain
- Engine: Petrol: 1.4 L PSA TU3 I4; 1.4 L FCA Fire I4 (Note: In Switzerland, also adapted to run with CNG, for Peugeot Bipper only.); Petrol CNG: 1.4 L FCA Fire Natural Power I4 (Note: Fiat Qubo only. (Note: different cubic capacity.)); Diesel: 1.3 L MultiJet I4; 1.4 L Ford DV4 I4 HDi (Note: Citroën Nemo and Peugeot Bipper only.)
- Transmission: 5-speed manual 6-speed manual 5-speed automated manual 6-speed automated manual

Dimensions
- Wheelbase: Fiat: 2,513 mm (98.9 in)
- Length: Fiat: 3,864–3,964 mm (152.1–156.1 in); Citroën/Peugeot: 3,860 mm (152 in)
- Width: Fiat: 1,716 mm (67.6 in); Citroën/Peugeot: 1,710 mm (67 in)
- Height: Fiat: 1,721 mm (67.8 in); Citroën/Peugeot: 1.720 m (67.7 in)
- Kerb weight: 1,165 kg (2,568 lb)

Chronology
- Successor: Citroën Berlingo/Peugeot Rifter/Fiat Doblò

The third generation Fiat Fiorino (Type 225) leisure activity vehicle was unveiled in October 2007, and went on sale in February 2008. The Fiorino shares architecture and body work with the Citroën Nemo and Peugeot Bipper under the Sevel joint venture between Fiat and PSA Peugeot Citroën (which has merged to Stellantis since 2021). Production began in November 2007.

Built by Tofaş in Bursa, Turkey, they are produced in both panel van and passenger body styles, and are situated below the larger LAVs Fiat Doblò, Citroën Berlingo and Peugeot Partner, in their manufacturers' line ups. Fiat also retails its passenger model as the Fiat Qubo, with the Fiorino name designating the commercial models.

The Fiorino and its siblings are based on the Fiat Grande Punto Small platform, with a wheelbase of 2,513 millimetres (98.9 in). This project can be seen as a breakthrough in Tofaş history as it carried most of the development work in addition to responsibility for its assembly.

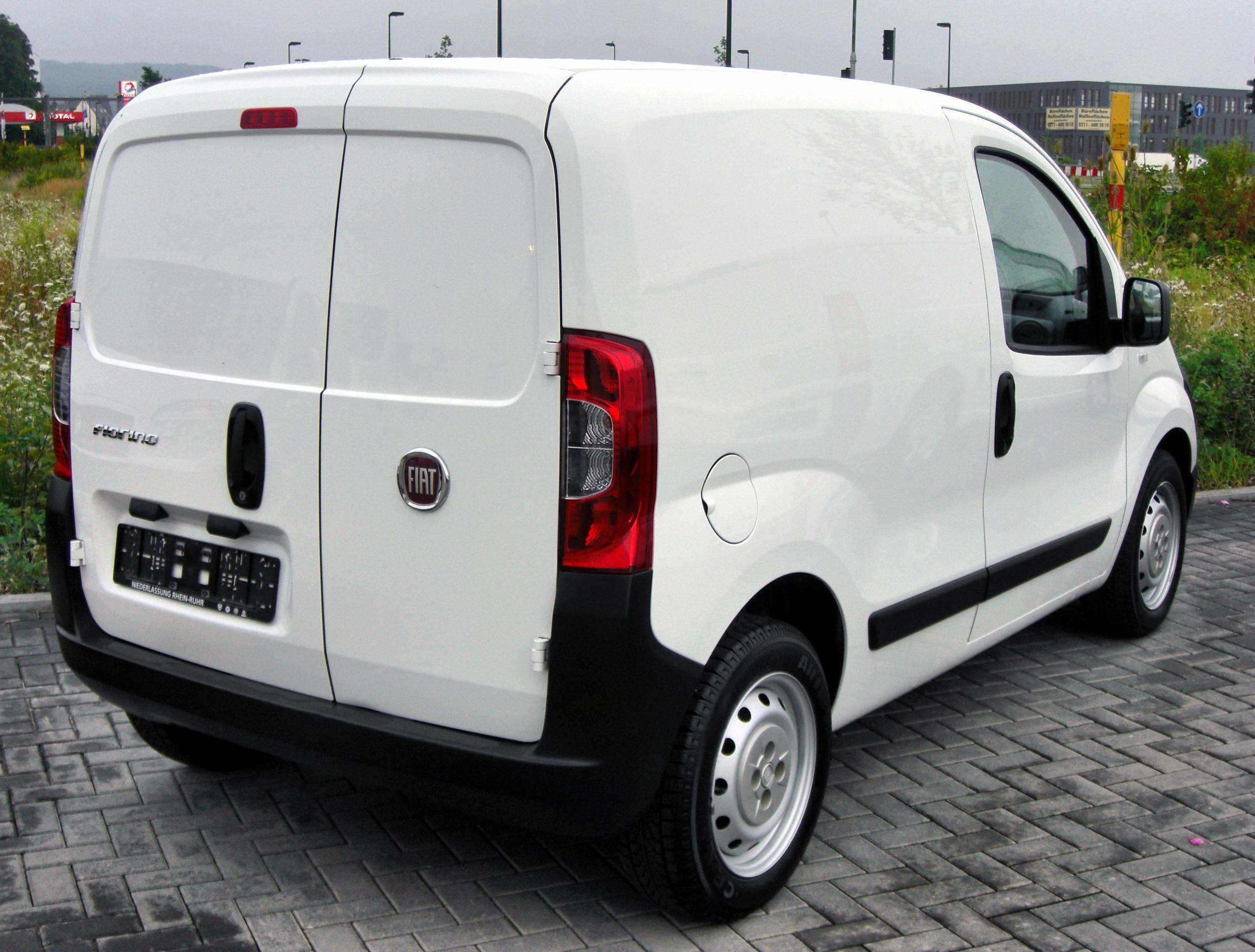
Fiat Fiorino Cargo Base (Rear)

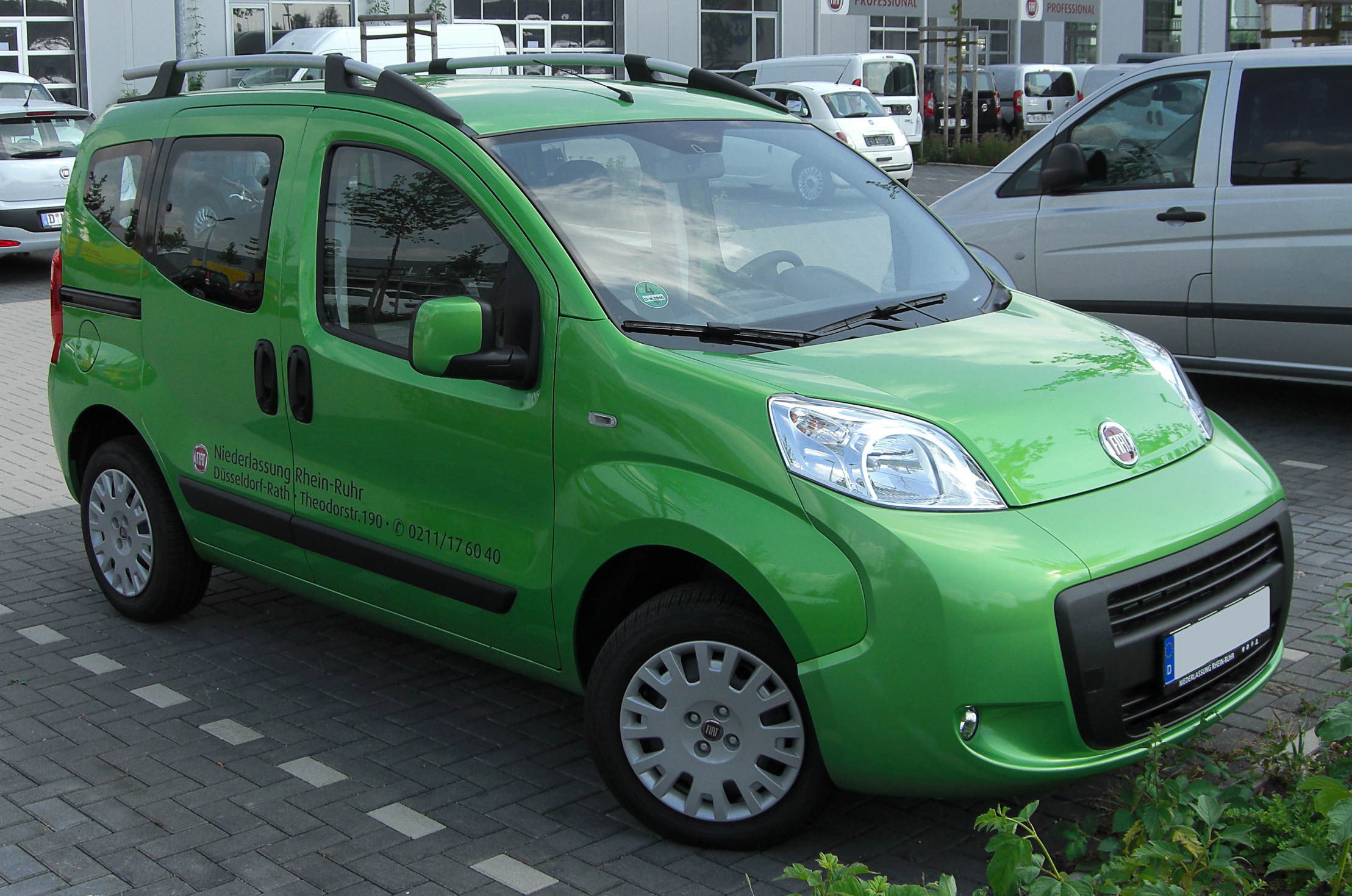
Fiat Qubo (Front)

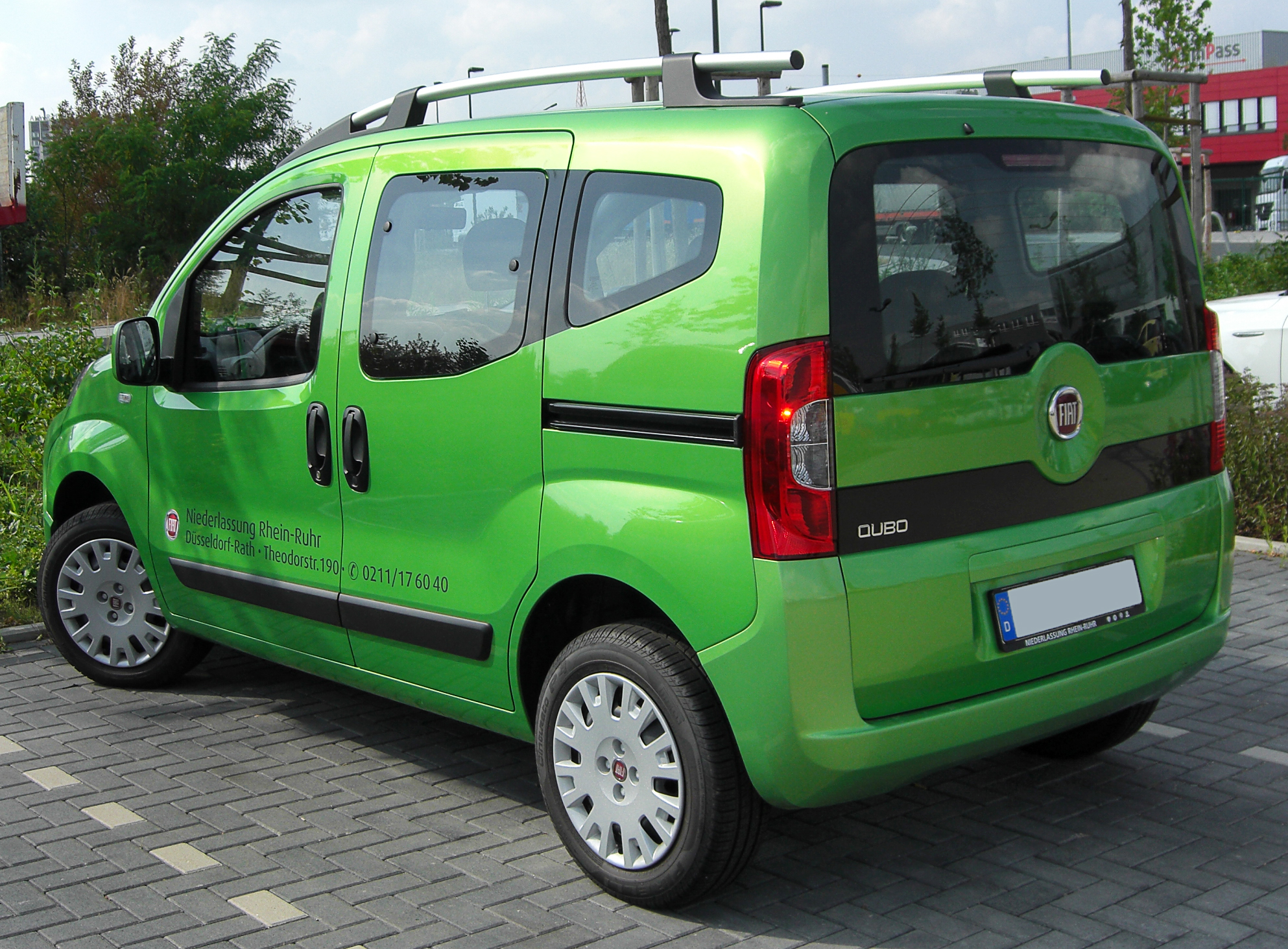
Fiat Qubo

Fiat launched their passenger carrying equivalent at the Geneva Motor Show in March 2008. It is branded as the Fiat Qubo. A derivative of the Fiorino (a small MPV), a passenger version of the Fiorino was unveiled in June 2008. This version is suitable for up to five people and can be equipped with different engines, including a 1.3 Multijet diesel (75 PS) or 1.4 litre petrol engine with 73 hp (54 kW).

In some countries (such as Turkey), the passenger version Qubo was sold as the "Fiorino Panorama".

As of 2020, the Fiat Qubo passenger variant is no longer available in certain regions, but remains in others. The Fiorino commercial version remains available.

=== Peugeot Bipper and Citroën Nemo (2008–2017) ===
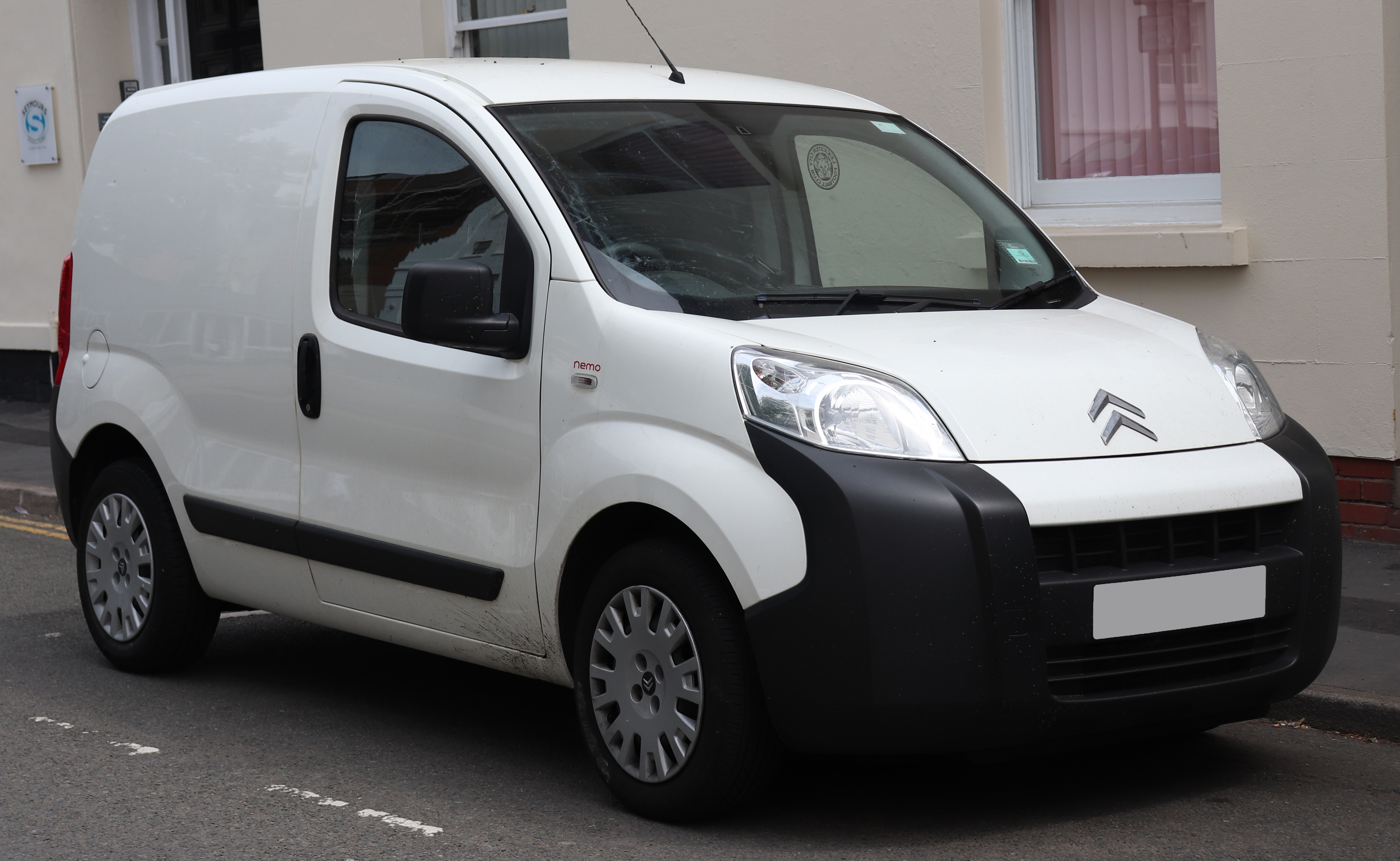
Citroën Nemo

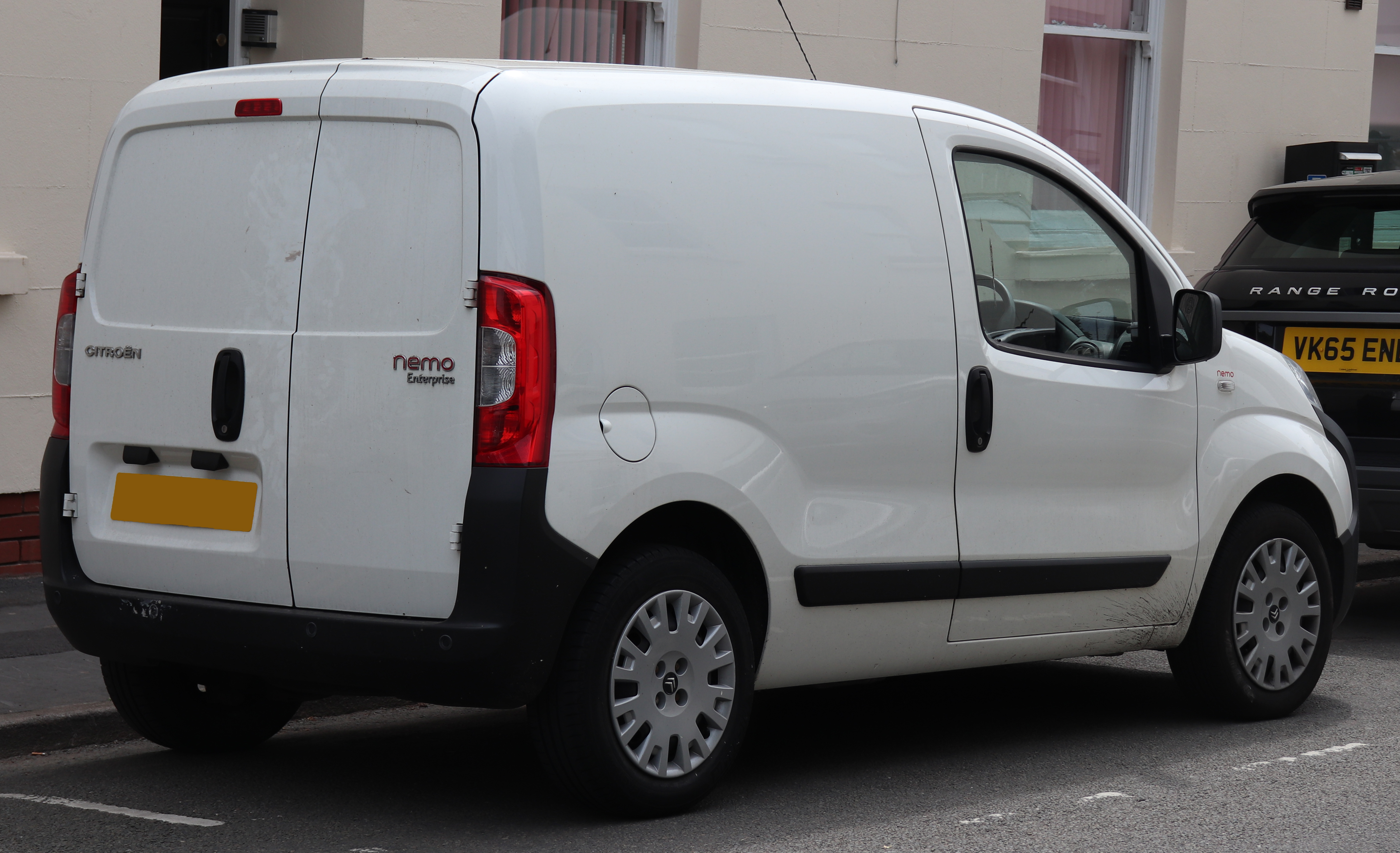
Citroën Nemo (Rear)

The Citroën Nemo is a badge engineered van launched in January 2008 by Citroën. The vehicle is the result of a partnership between Fiat, PSA Peugeot Citroën and Tofaş. The other platform derivatives are the Peugeot Bipper and the Fiat Fiorino.

The Citroën Nemo Combi (then, Nemo Multispace) is a small MPV, which was also introduced in 2008, and is based on the same platform.

In April 2010, during a routine evasive manoeuvre test, conducted in Germany, the vehicle rolled over. The shape of the vehicle; as a high bodied, short wheelbase van caused the roll. The addition of Electronic stability control (ESC) would likely have prevented this but was not available as standard or as an option on the Nemo.

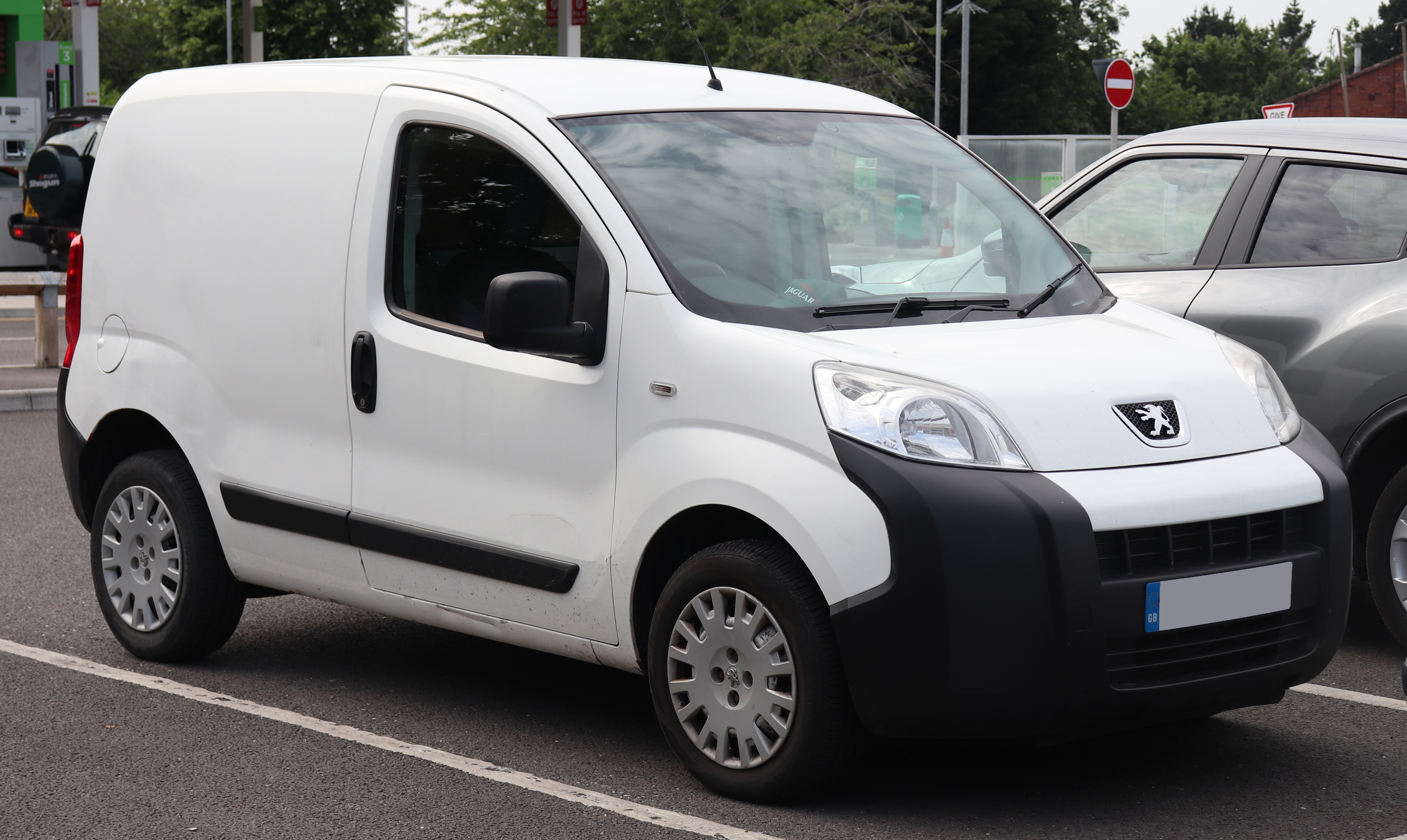
Peugeot Bipper

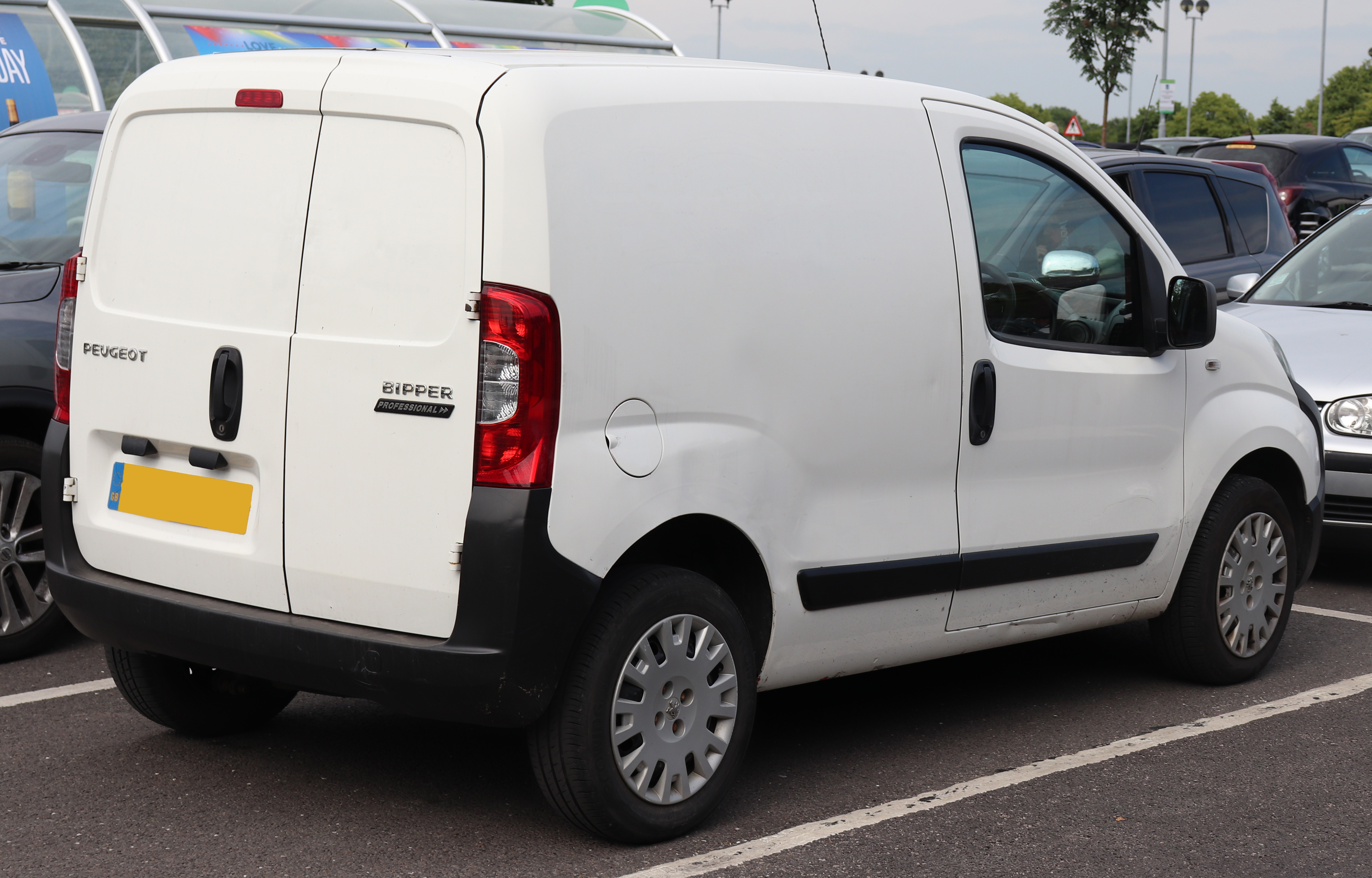
Peugeot Bipper (Rear)

The Peugeot Bipper is a small delivery van sold by French automaker Peugeot since May 2008. It shares its body, platform and most components with the contemporary Citroën Nemo and Fiat Fiorino.

The Citroën Nemo, Fiat Fiorino III, and Peugeot Bipper were developed jointly with Tofaş, following an agreement signed on 31 March 2005. The vans are manufactured on behalf of all the partners in Bursa by Tofaş.

The Bipper is marketed as a "mini cargovan" designed for big and small cities, cheaper and a little smaller than the Peugeot Partner.

The Peugeot Bipper Tepee is a small MPV, which was also introduced in 2008, and is based on the same platform.

=== 2016 facelift ===
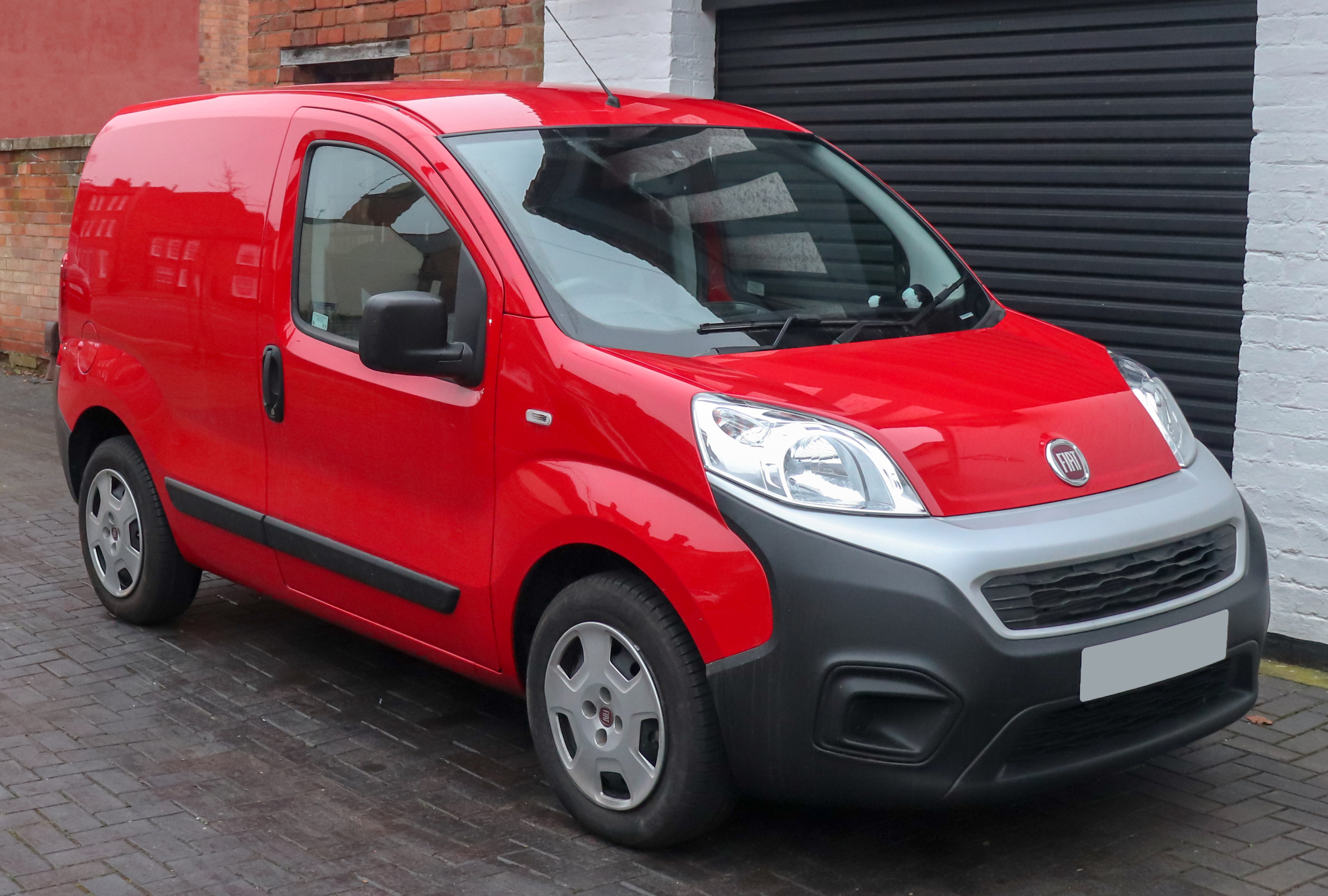

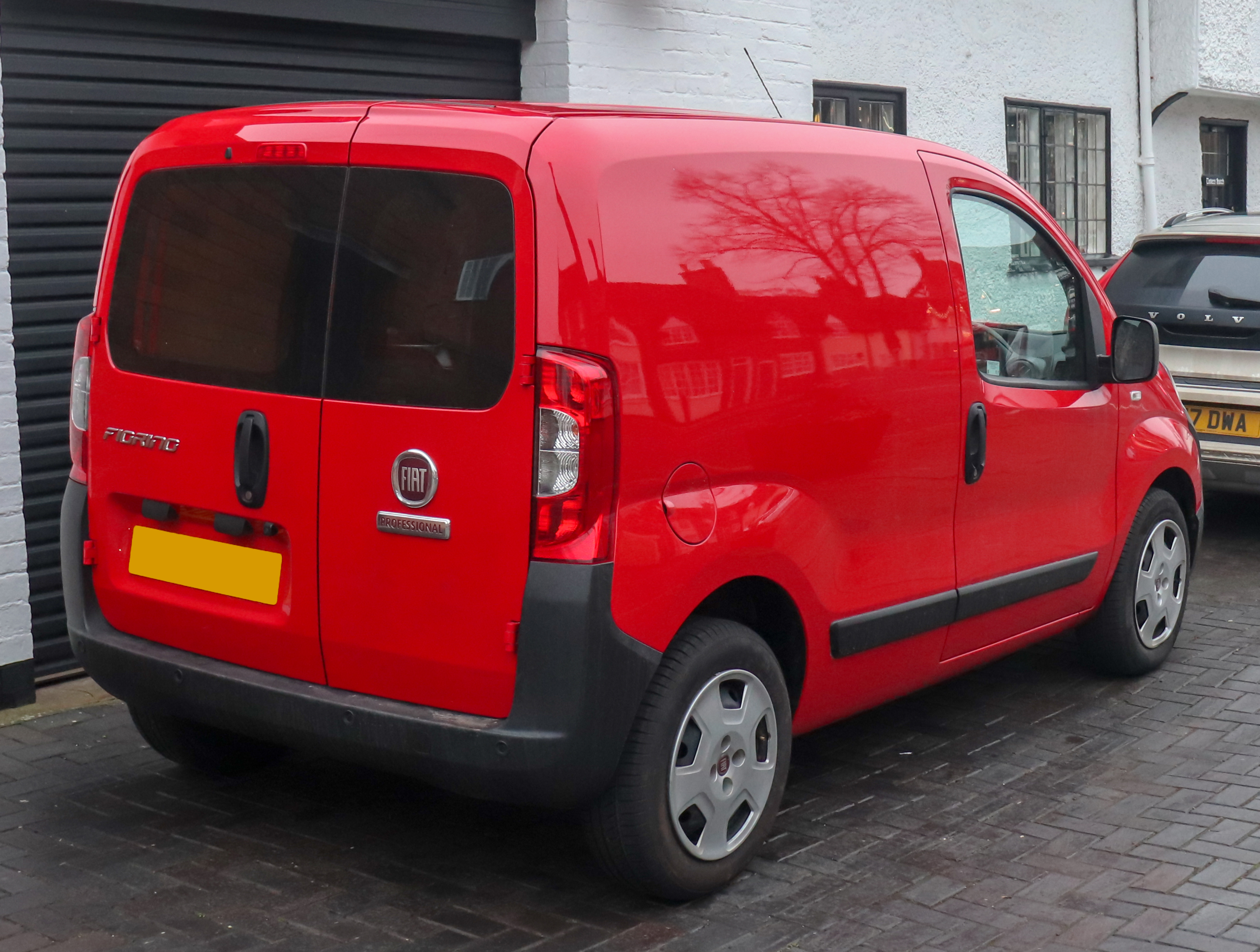
2016 facelift

In April 2016, Fiat Professional introduced a facelift for the Fiorino range, featuring a new front bumper with a chrome strip that incorporates the design of the Doblò and Ducato brothers. Also new are the alloy wheels and plastic covers. Inside the new steering wheel is a new infotainment system developed by Magneti Marelli with a 5-inch touchscreen that integrates car radio, satellite navigation, Bluetooth, USB, and AUX. The engine range consists of the 1.4 petrol Fire with 77 horsepower, the 1.4 Natural Power petrol/methane, and the diesel 1.3 Multijet with 80 and 95 horsepower. Fiat also introduced a low emission version called EcoJet available with a 1.3 diesel engine with manual or an automated manual gearbox (called Comfort-Matic, an evolution of the previous Dualogic); the EcoJet has low rolling impact tires and a variable displacement oil pump. Trim levels include Cargo, Combined and Panorama versions, which also includes the Adventure set-up (available in all three versions) with raised trim and suspension, M+S tires, specific alloy wheels, additional bumper bands and Traction+ differential lock electronic system.

The PSA brand versions, on the other hand, were not updated and went out of production in December 2017.

In July 2018, the Fiat Fiorino engines were re-homologated Euro 6D-Temp.

In February 2022, the new Fiat logo is adopted at the front of the vehicle.

==== Engines ====
Name	Fuel	Engine type	Volume	Output	Engine code	Emission standard	CO_{2} emissions (g/km)	Notes
1.4 8V	Gasoline	4 Cyl Inline 8v OHC	1,360 cc (83 cu in)	73 hp (54 kW)	PSA TU3	Euro 4	152	
1.4 8V	bi-fuel Gasoline-CNG	4 Cyl Inline 8v	1,368 cc (83.5 cu in)	69 hp (51 kW)	Fiat Fire Natural Power	Euro 5	114	Only for Fiat Qubo
1.3 16V	Diesel	4 Cyl Inline 16v DOHC	1,248 cc (76.2 cu in)	75 hp (55 kW)	Fiat Multijet	Euro 4		Only for Fiat Fiorino and Qubo
1.3 16V	Diesel	4 Cyl Inline 16v DOHC	1,248 cc (76.2 cu in)	76 hp (56 kW)	Fiat Multijet	Euro 5	113	
1.3 16V	Diesel	4 Cyl Inline 16v DOHC	1,248 cc (76.2 cu in)	96 hp (71 kW)	Fiat Multijet	Euro 5		
1.4 8V	Diesel	4 Cyl Inline 8v OHC	1,398 cc (85.3 cu in)	70 hp (51 kW)	PSA DV4 HDi	Euro 4	119	Only for Citroën Nemo & Peugeot Bipper (2007-2010)

==== Sales and production figures ====
Year	Production			Sales			Notes
Year	Nemo	Qubo	Bipper	Nemo	Qubo	Bipper	Notes
2009	TBA	TBA	32,300	TBA	TBA	34,300	
2010	TBA	TBA	42,900	TBA	TBA	44,500	
2011	33,406	TBA	34,760	34,304	TBA	34,354	Total Nemo production reaches 154,959 units. Total Bipper production reaches 142,671 units.
2012	27,500	TBA	24,200	28,500	TBA	26,000	Total Nemo production reaches 182,400 units. Total Bipper production reaches 166,900 units.

=== Latin America (2013–present) ===
Fiat Fiorino (327)
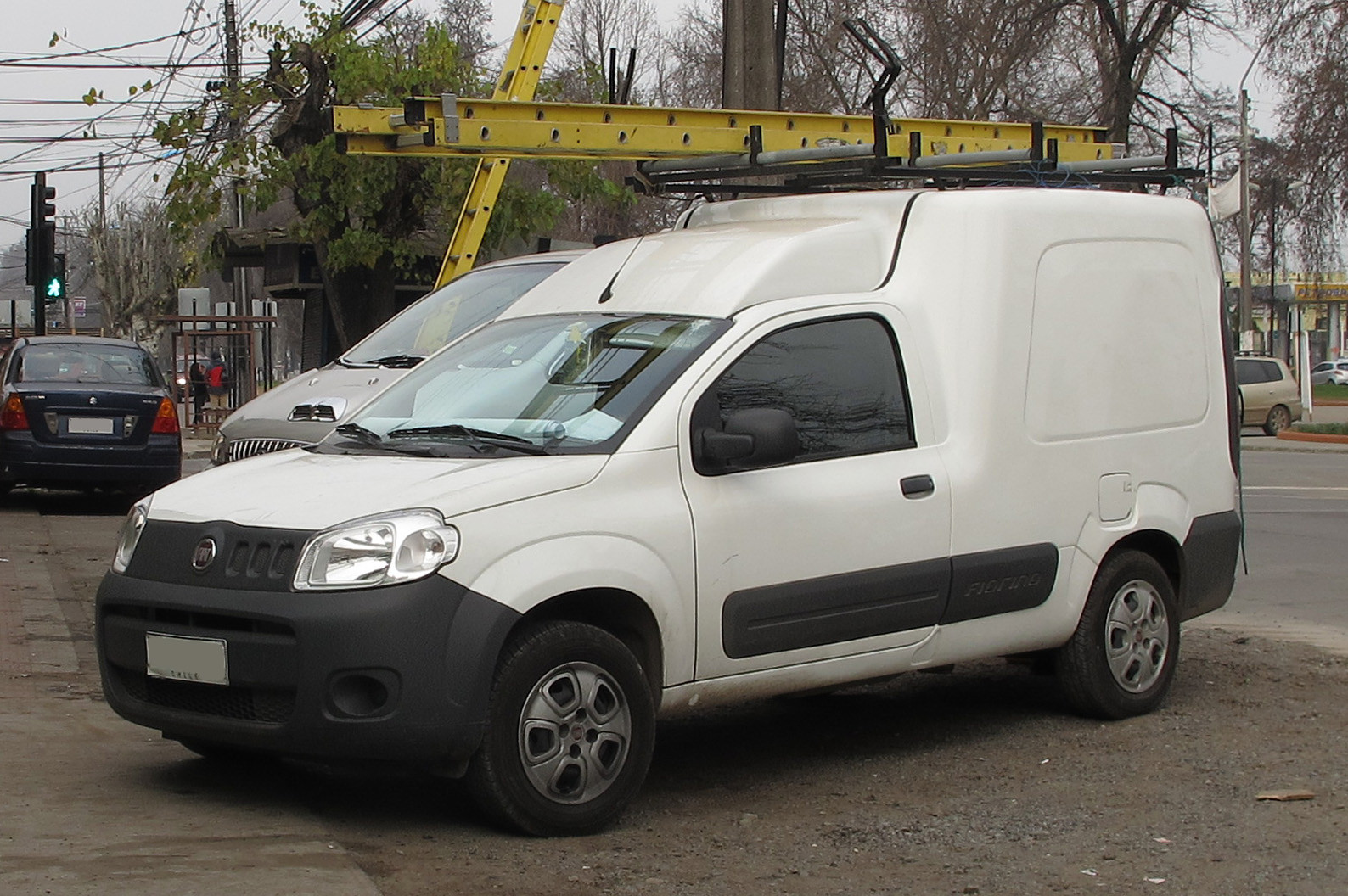
- Fiat Fiorino (pre-facelift)

Overview
- Also called: Ram ProMaster Rapid (Mexico); Ram V700 Rapid (South America); Ram V700 (South America); Peugeot Partner Rapid (Brazil; 2022–present)
- Production: October 2013–present
- Model years: 2014–present
- Assembly: Brazil: Betim

Body and chassis
- Platform: FCA Economy
- Related: Fiat Uno (327)

Powertrain
- Engine: 1.4 L Fire EVO Flex I4 (petrol/ethanol); 1.3 L Firefly Flex I4 (petrol/ethanol)
- Transmission: 5-speed manual

Dimensions
- Wheelbase: 2,717 mm (107.0 in)
- Length: 4,384 mm (172.6 in)
- Width: 1,809 mm (71.2 in)
- Height: 1,900 mm (74.8 in)
- Kerb weight: 1,117 kg (2,463 lb)

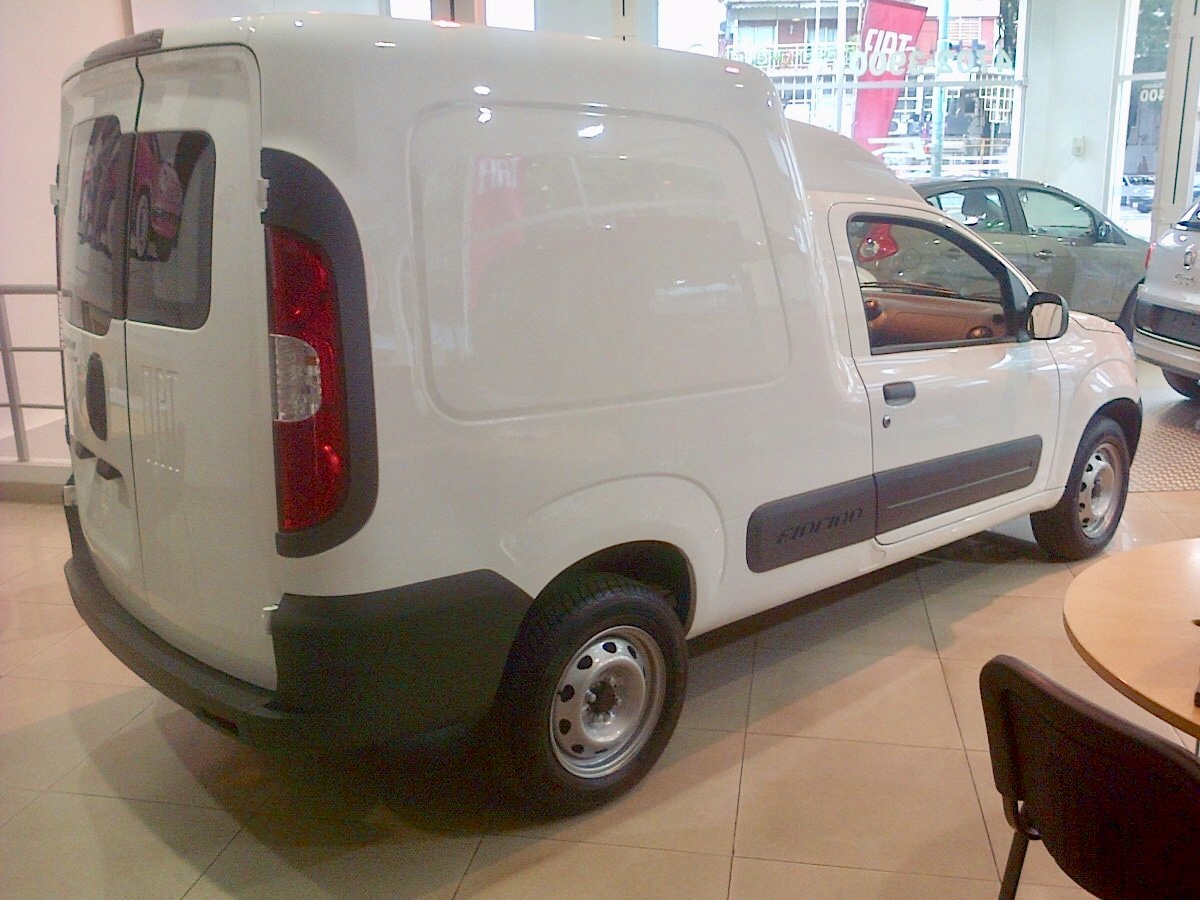
Fiat Fiorino rear (pre-facelift)

In 2013, a new version of the Fiat Fiorino (different from the European version) was introduced in Brazil, where it is also produced. As the previous Fiorino was based on the first generation Fiat Uno and its later Fiat Mille evolution, the new Fiorino is based on the second generation Fiat Uno (327), an all new model launched in 2010. The vehicle was introduced in October 2013 as a 2014 model, at the 19th edition of the Fenatran (International Road Cargo Transportation Show, held in São Paulo), alongside the Uno Furgão — the panel van version of the Uno it is based on.

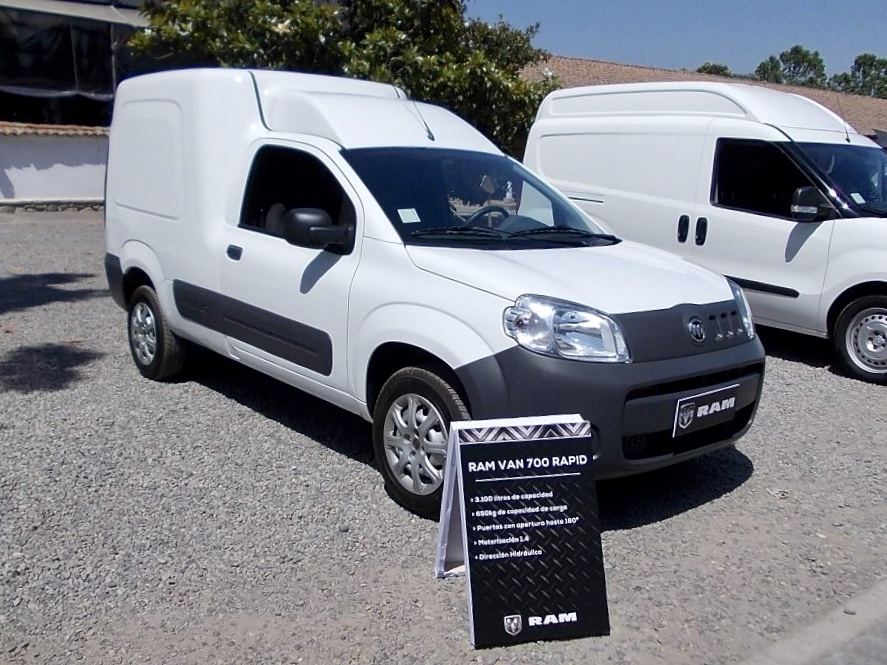
Ram V700 Rapid (pre-facelift)

The Brazilian-spec Fiorino is sold under the Ram Trucks division in Mexico as the Ram Promaster Rapid and in Chile, Bolivia, Colombia, and Peru as the Ram V700 Rapid.

In December 2021, Fiat presented a facelift of the model with minor visual changes, as a 2022 model. Since May 2022, the Brazilian-spec Fiorino is also sold under the Peugeot in Brazil, as Partner Rapid.

Until 2024, the Fiorino was offered with the 1.4 Evo Flex flexible fuel 1,368 cc four-cylinder used in the Uno, from the Fire engine family. It produces 85 or 88 hp (63 or 65 kW) at 5,750 rpm and 122 or 123 N⋅m (90 or 91 lb⋅ft) at 3,500 rpm, when running on petrol or ethanol fuel respectively. In 2025, the 1.4 Evo Flex was replaced by the 1.3 8V Firefly Flex.

In September 2026, the Peugeot model is launched in Argentina, following the opening of Argentina car market to imports, and partially replacing the first-generation Peugeot Partner which was still built in the country until there.

=== Sales ===
Year	Brazil		Mexico	Argentina
Year	Fiat	Peugeot	Mexico	Argentina
2002	7,980			
2003	7,389			
2004	8,970			
2005	12,501			
2006	12,325			
2007	16,033			
2008	18,143			
2009	17,074			
2010	17,413			
2011	18,025			
2012	14,321			
2013	12,435			
2014	23,824			
2015	14,983			5,205
2016	9,760			7,185
2017	10,947		382	8,221
2018	13,547		4,884	6,917
2019	17,237		4,043	4,109
2020	17,852		4,005	2,126
2021	20,602		3,647	1,695
2022	20,953	1,146	1,477	1,283
2023	21,865	1,716	3,962	
2024	20,208	761		
2025	21,329	525		
