= Daihatsu Feroza =

Automotive nameplate by Daihatsu

The Daihatsu Feroza is an automobile nameplate used by the Japanese automobile manufacturer Daihatsu between 1989 and 2002 for two SUV models:

- Daihatsu Feroza (F300 series), an export version of the F300 series Rocky sold between 1989 and 2002
- Daihatsu Feroza (F70), a gasoline-engined, rear-wheel-drive variant of the Rugger sold in Indonesia between 1993 and 1999
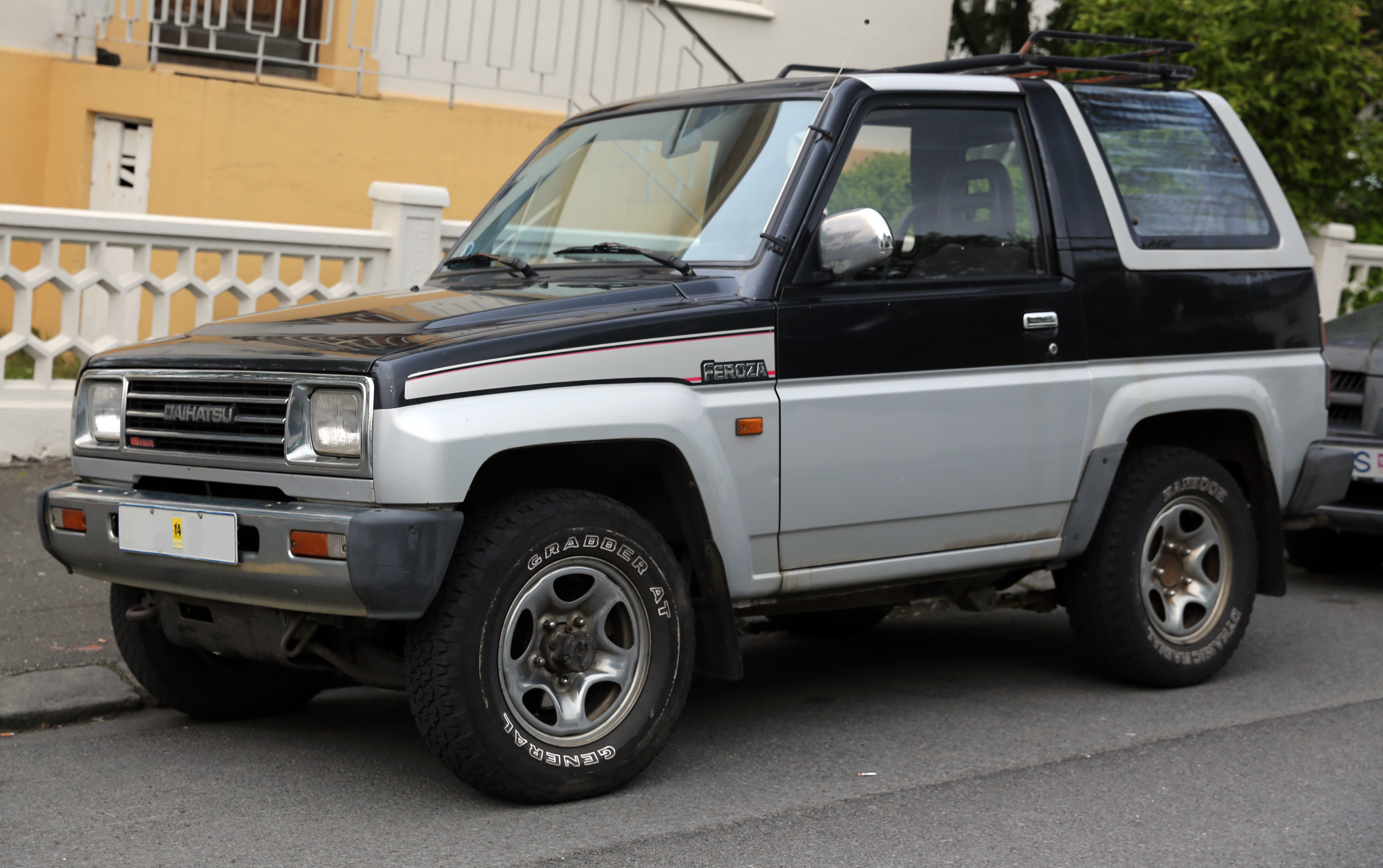
1990 Daihatsu Feroza (F300)

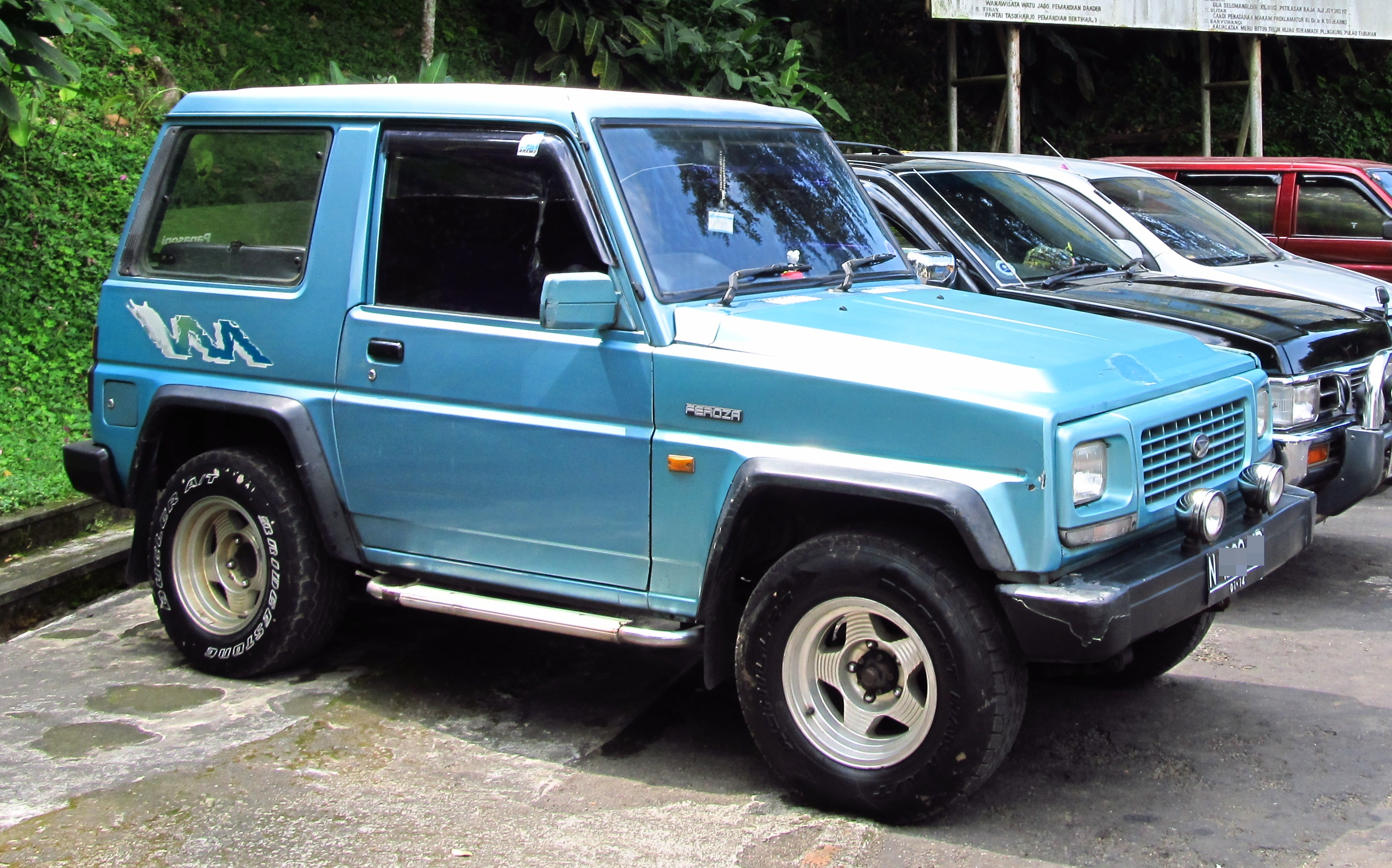
1995 Daihatsu Feroza (F70)
