= Hyundai H-100 =

Hyundai H-100 is a name used by Hyundai Motor Company in export markets for two related light trucks:

- Hyundai Porter, a pickup truck.
- Hyundai Grace, a minibus/van.
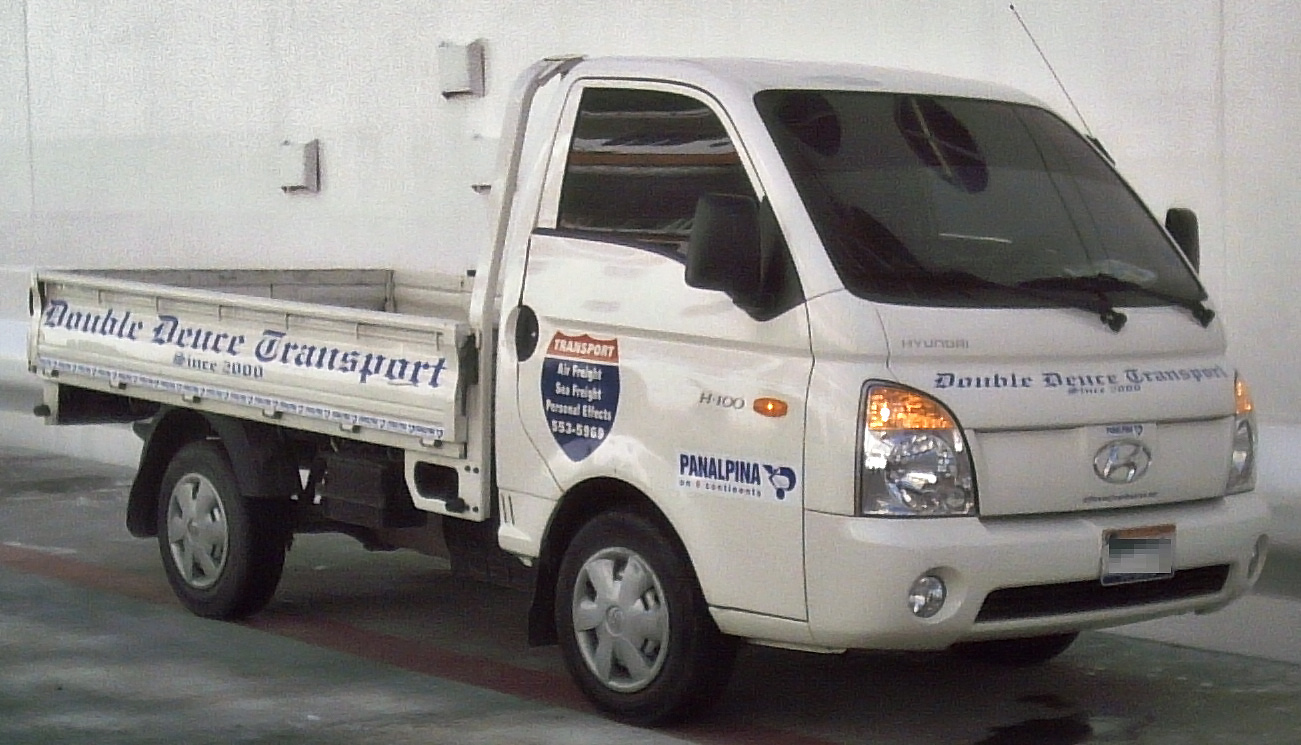
Porter-based truck

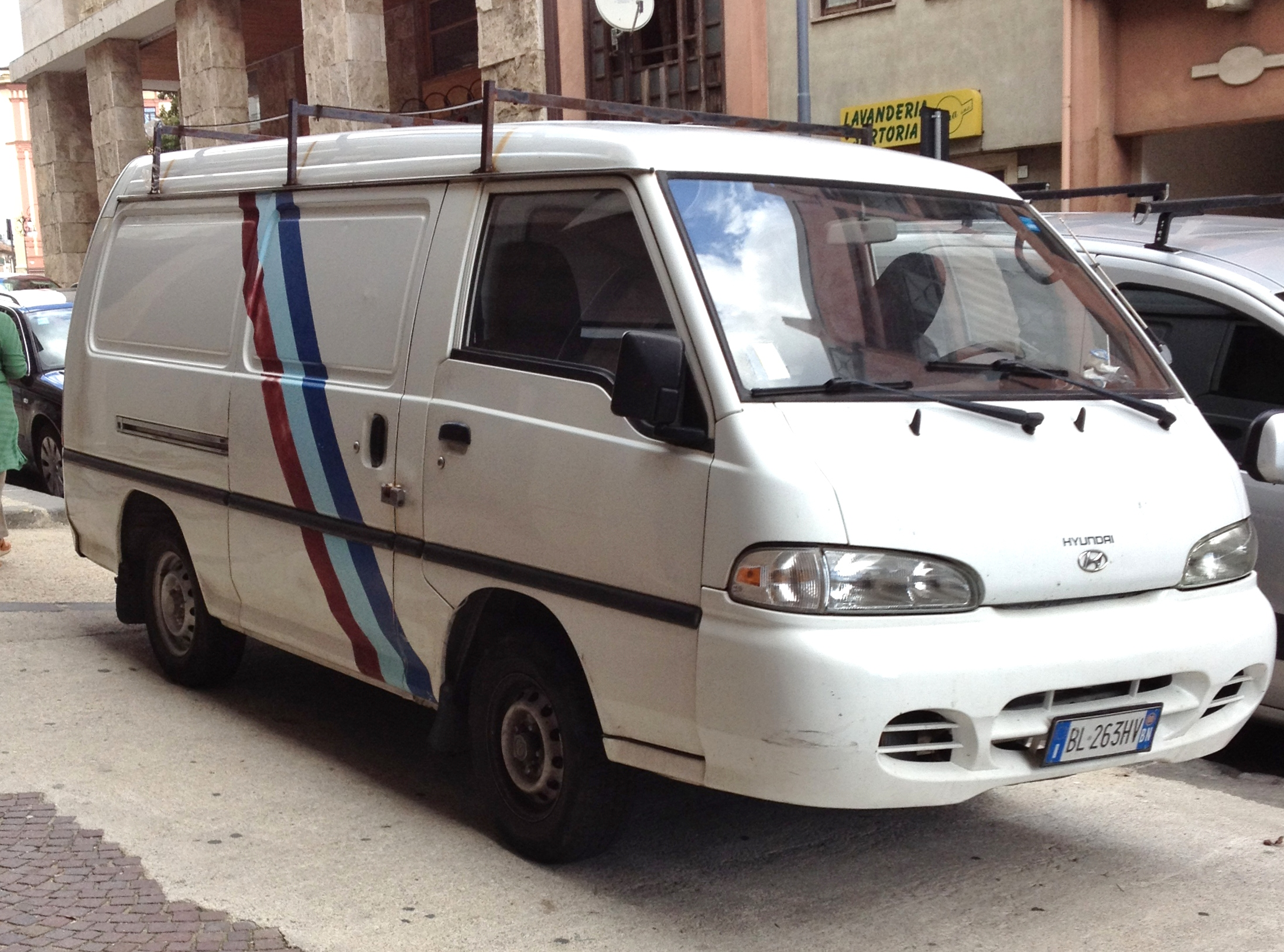
Van version of the Grace-based H100
