= Fiat 1500 =

Fiat 1500 may refer to:

- Fiat 1500 (1935), the 1935 model
- Fiat 1300 and 1500, the 1961 model
- Fiat 1500 Coupé/Cabriolet, sporting models using the new 1500 engine in the old 1200 chassis
