= Fiat Turbina =

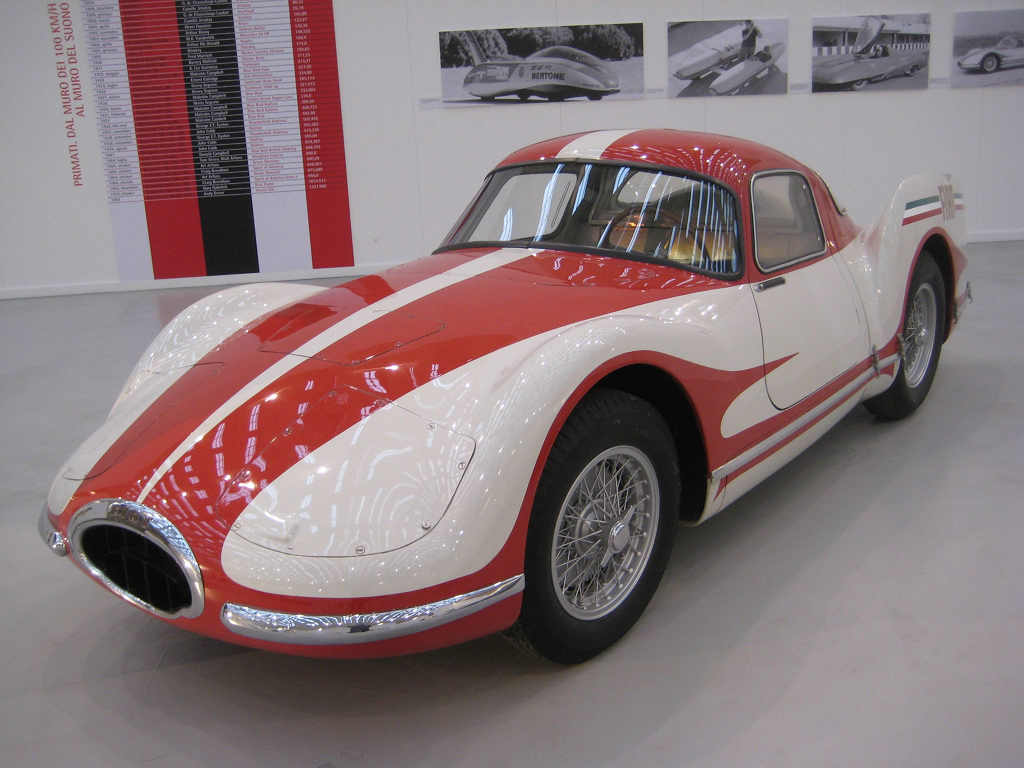

Overview
- Manufacturer: Fiat
- Also called: Fiat 8001 Turbina
- Production: 1954
- Designer: Luigi Rapi

Body and chassis
- Body style: 2-door berlinetta
- Layout: Rear mid-engine, rear-wheel-drive
- Doors: suicide

Powertrain
- Engine: Fiat type 8001 gas turbine

Dimensions
- Wheelbase: 2,400 mm (94.5 in)
- Length: 4,370 mm (172.0 in)
- Width: 1,610 mm (63.4 in)
- Height: 1,255 mm (49.4 in)
- Kerb weight: 1,050 kg (2,315 lb)

The Fiat Turbina was a gas turbine-powered concept car built by Italian car manufacturer Fiat in 1954.

Fiat was the second car manufacturer, after Rover, to introduce a car propelled by a gas turbine—Fiat touted the Turbina as "the first turbine car built in Continental Europe". The project took a long period of planning, studies began in 1948 and ended with a first track test on 14 April 1954 on the rooftop track of the Lingotto factory. The car was first publicly shown on 23 April 1954 at the Turin-Caselle Airport, where it made some demonstration runs with Fiat chief test driver Carlo Salamano at the wheel. All major Fiat personalities were present, including Gianni Agnelli, president Vittorio Valletta and engineer Dante Giacosa, director of the technical office and responsible for the car's development. The Turbina was then displayed at the ongoing 36th Turin Motor Show.

The turbine engine was placed amidships, behind the passenger compartment. It consisted of a two-stage centrifugal compressor, three can-type combustors, a two-stage turbine driving the compressor, and a single-stage power turbine with a geared reduction to the rear wheels. There was no gearbox or clutch. According to the manufacturer the engine produced 300 PS (220 kW; 300 hp) at 22,000 rpm, and the estimated top speed was approximately 250 km/h (160 mph). The bodywork had undergone wind tunnel testing at the Politecnico di Torino facilities, with tests showing a drag coefficient of Cd=0.14 on a one-fifth scale model of the car. By comparison, a 2017 Tesla Model 3 has a drag coefficient of Cd=0.23.

The concept was shelved due to high fuel usage and problems with overheating.

The Fiat Turbina is on display at the Automobile Museum of Turin.

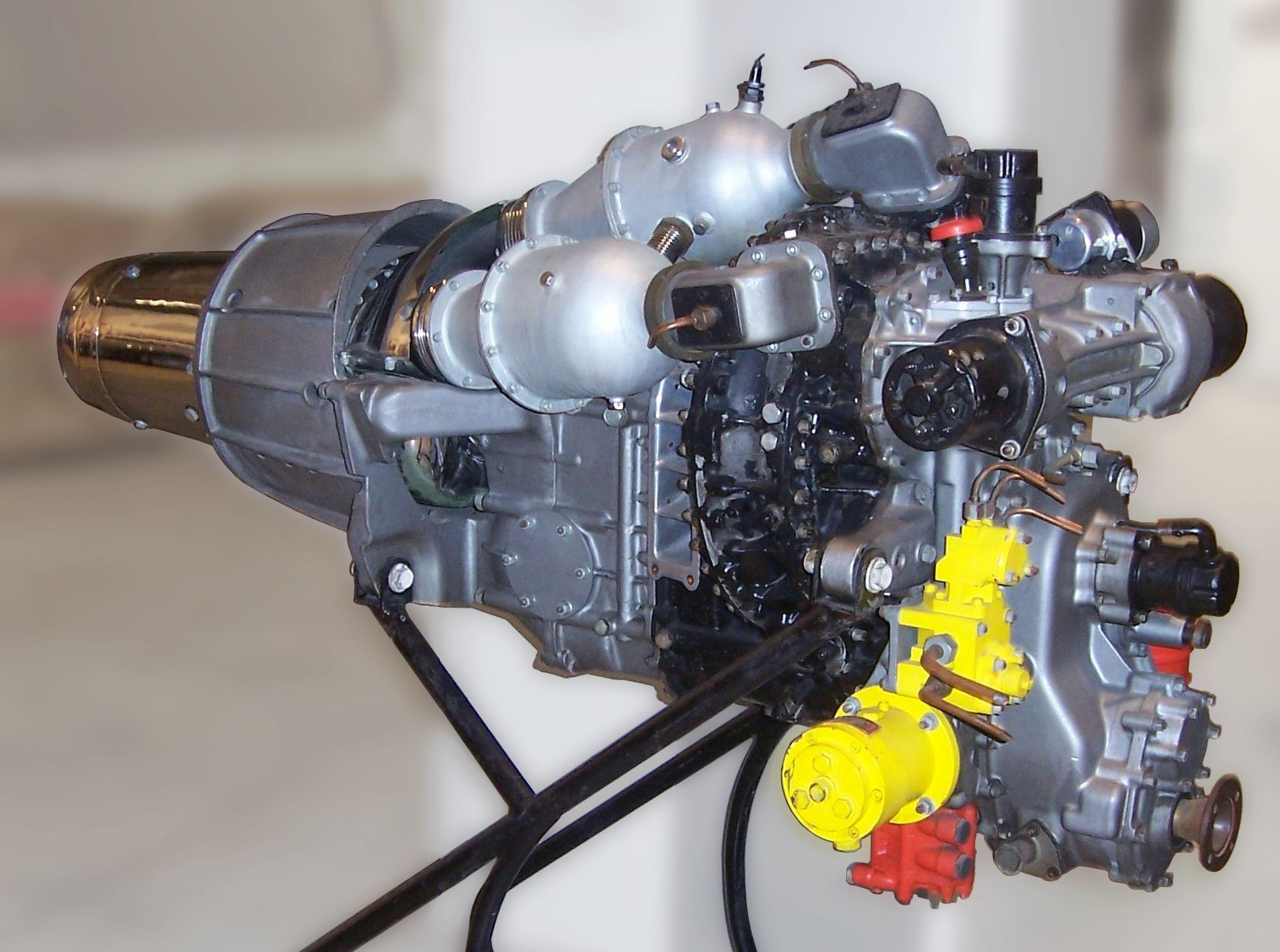
The type 8001 gas turbine that powered the Turbina

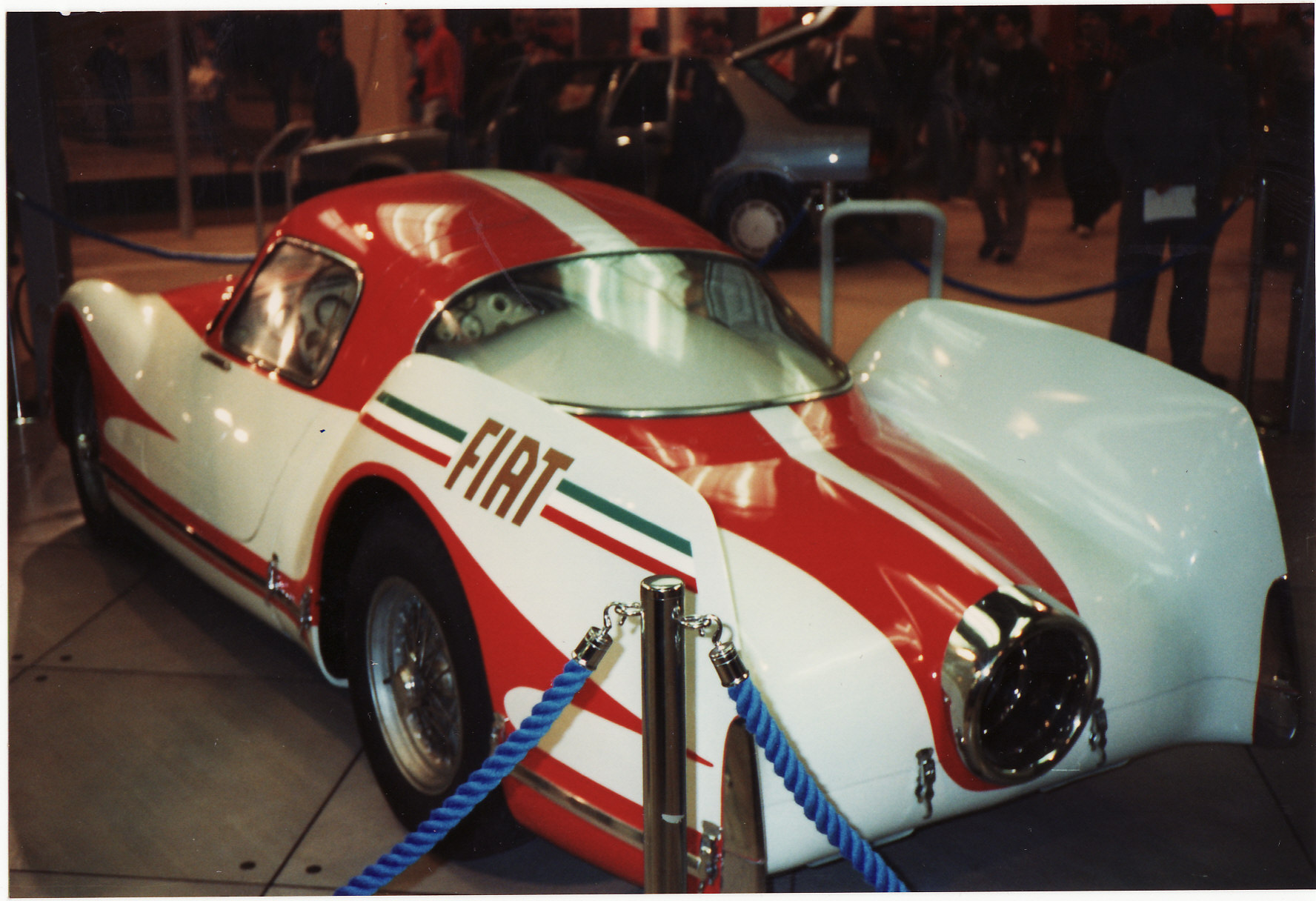
Tailfins and the turbine exhaust stood out at the rear of the car

== See also ==
- Chrysler Turbine Car
- General Motors Firebird
- Rover-BRM
- Renault Étoile Filante
