= Autobianchi Stellina =

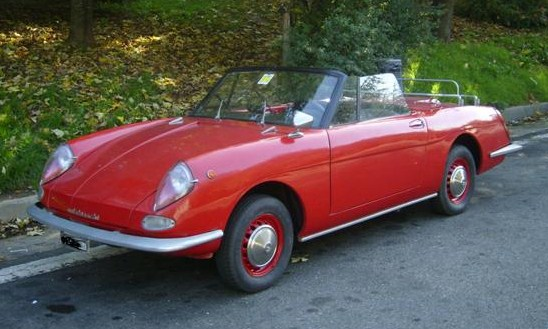

Overview
- Manufacturer: Autobianchi
- Production: 1964–1965
- Designer: Luigi Rapi

Body and chassis
- Class: Spider
- Body style: 2-door cabriolet
- Layout: RR layout
- Related: Fiat 600D

Powertrain
- Engine: 767 cc I4 OHV
- Transmission: 4-speed manual

Dimensions
- Wheelbase: 2,000 mm (78.7 in)
- Length: 3,670 mm (144.5 in)
- Width: 1,430 mm (56.3 in)
- Curb weight: 660 kg (1,455 lb)

Chronology
- Successor: Fiat 850 Spider

The Autobianchi Stellina is a small spider from the Italian automaker, Autobianchi (partly owned by the Fiat group at the time), built for only two years, 1964 and 1965. It was based on the mechanicals of the chassis Fiat 600D, but had a unique unibody structure, with the outside panels made of fibreglass reinforced plastics, based on a steel frame. It was the first Italian production car with a fibreglass body. Powered by Fiat 600D's rear-mounted, water-cooled 767 cc straight-4 engine, delivering 29 hp (22 kW), the Stellina had drum brakes on all four wheels.

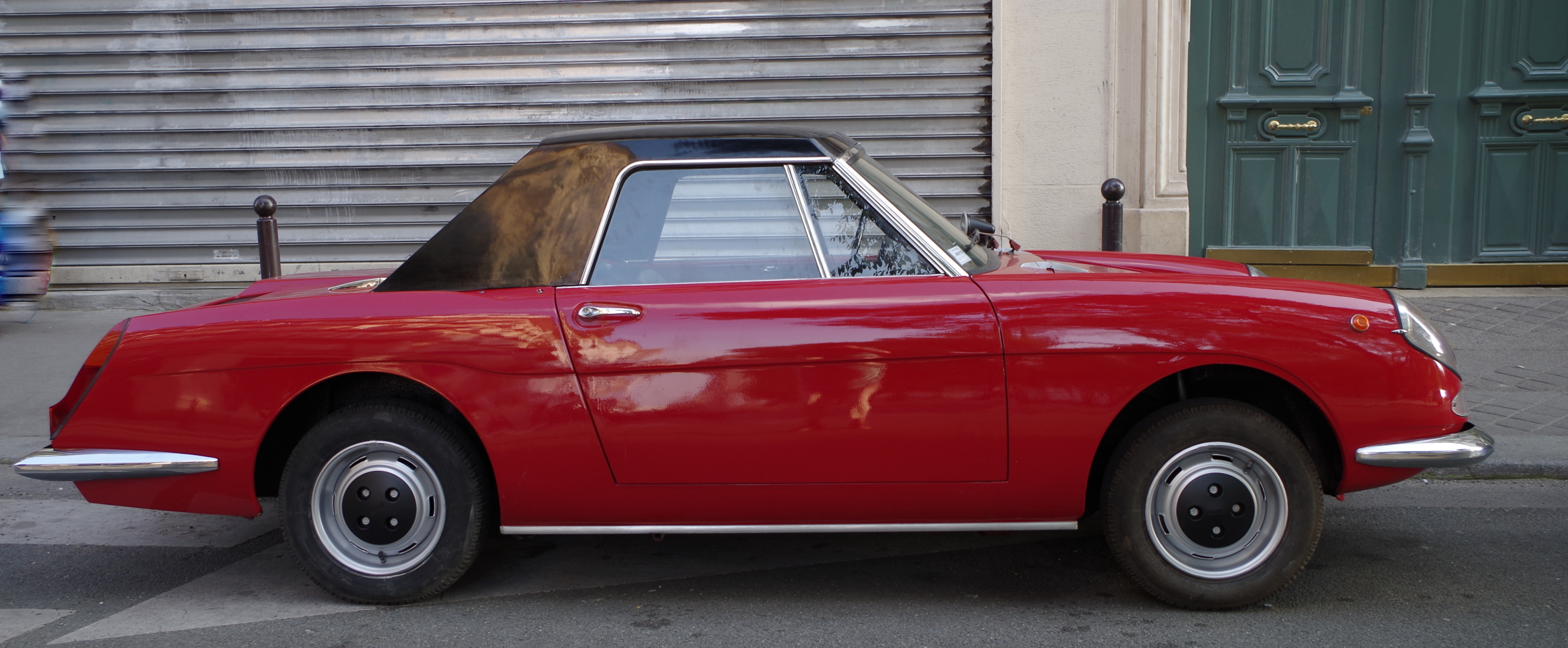
Side view

With sleek styling penned by Luigi Rapi, the Stellina was first presented as a prototype at the 1963 Turin Motor Show, and went on sale a year later with a price tag of almost a million lira. Only 502 Stellinas were made until production ceased in 1965, when Fiat launched a, slightly larger, similar Fiat 850 Spider.
