= Fiat 1200 =

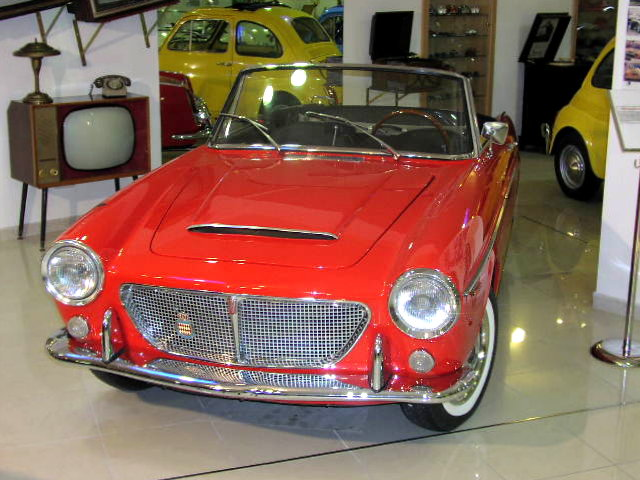
- Fiat 1200

Overview
- Manufacturer: Fiat

Body and chassis
- Layout: Front-engine, rear-wheel-drive
- Related: Fiat 1100

Powertrain
- Engine: 1221 cc I4 (petrol)
- Transmission: 4-speed manual

Fiat 1200 was the name of three distinct models produced by Italian car manufacturer Fiat, all based on Fiat 1100 mechanicals. The first two were introduced in 1957, and replaced the TV (Turismo Veloce) variants at the top of the Fiat 1100 range: the 1200 Granluce, an upmarket small four-door saloon derived from the 1100, and the 1200 Spyder, an update of the previous 1100 TV Trasformabile 2-door roadster. The 1200 Granluce was discontinued in 1961 when larger Fiat saloons were introduced, while the 1200 Trasformabile/Spyder was replaced in 1959 by the 1200 Cabriolet. This was a new Pininfarina design, later developed into the 1200 and 1500 Cabriolets.

== Fiat 1200 Granluce ==
Fiat 1200 Granluce
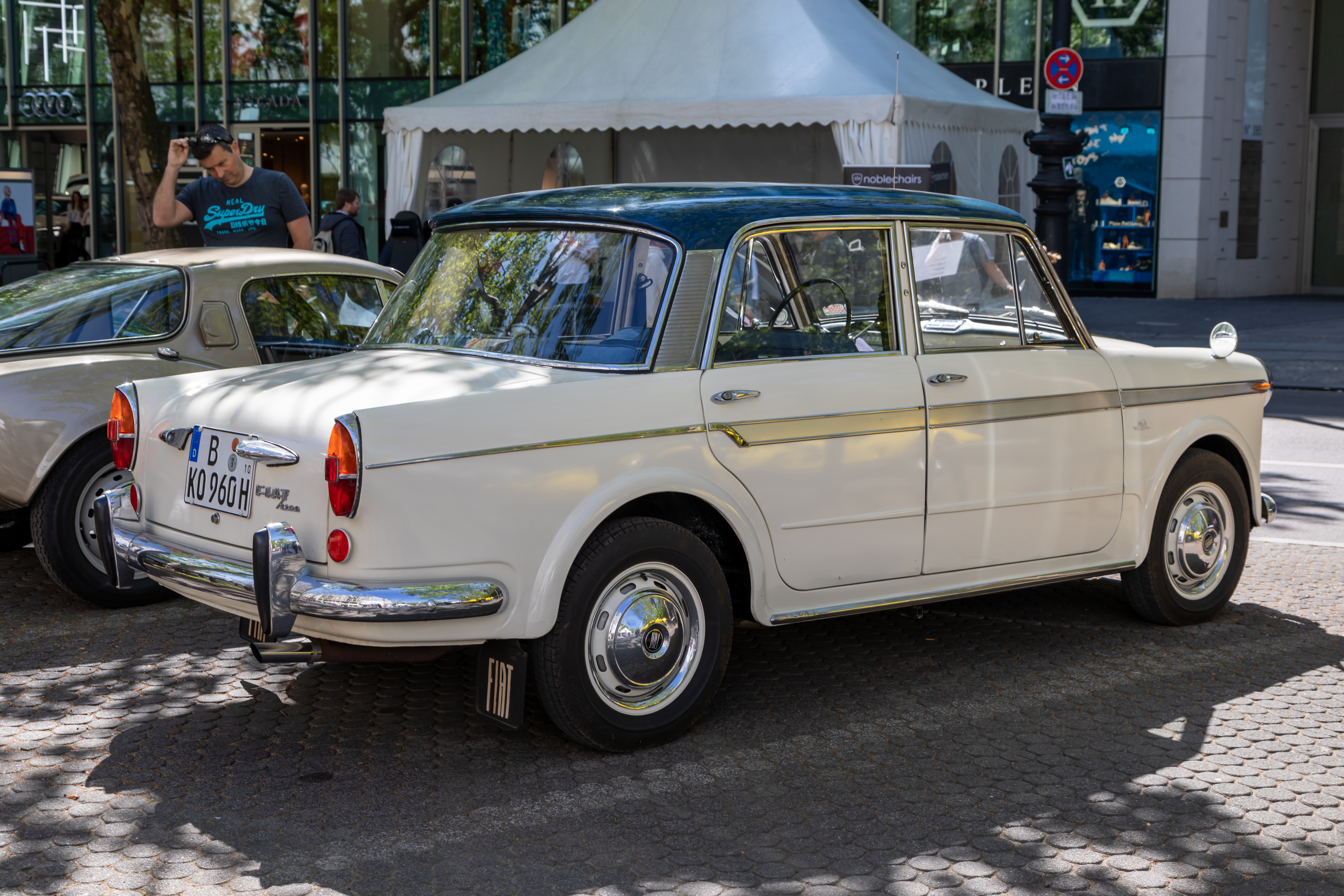
- Fiat 1200 Granluce

Overview
- Production: 1957–1961

Body and chassis
- Class: Small family car
- Body style: 4-door saloon
- Related: Fiat 1100

Dimensions
- Wheelbase: 2,340 mm (92.1 in)

Chronology
- Predecessor: Fiat 1100 TV
- Successor: Fiat 1300

The Fiat 1200 Granluce was introduced at the Turin Motor Show in November 1957. It was intended to replace the Fiat 1100/103 TV (Turismo Veloce), the sportiest and more luxuriously trimmed model of the 1100 range. The 1200 was equipped with a new engine of 1221 cc, a bored out version of the old 1100, developing 55 PS (40 kW; 54 bhp). This engine had already been used by Simca in France since late 1948.

While derived from the 1100, the 1200 Granluce had an all-new, more modern greenhouse, featuring a wider windshield, ampler side windows and a rear panoramic window—hence the Granluce name, translated as "full-light" in Fiat's own English-language sales materials. At the rear the car adopted the fins and longer boot of the contemporary 1100 model 1958. Intended as a luxury model, the Granluce's bodywork was heavily decorated: there was a contrasting colour roof, a ribbed chrome panel on the C pillar, and bright trim on the bonnet, sides and boot lid. Early publicity photos show the 1200 with suicide doors (hinged at the rear), but the production model did not feature these.

Approximately 400,000 copies of the 1200 Granluce were built before it was discontinued in September 1961, when the new and larger Fiat 1300 was launched. Despite this the Granluce bodyshell was inherited by upmarket 1100 versions as the 1100 Special, and in 1963 the mainstream 1100 D adopted not only the body but also the engine from the 1200. This led to the use of the former Fiat 1200 bodyshell on several models sold in India by Premier Automobiles Limited known as the Fiat 1100 Delight, Premier President and finally the Padmini Premier whose production ended only in 2001.

== Fiat 1200 TV Spider ==
Fiat 1200 TV Spider/Trasformabile
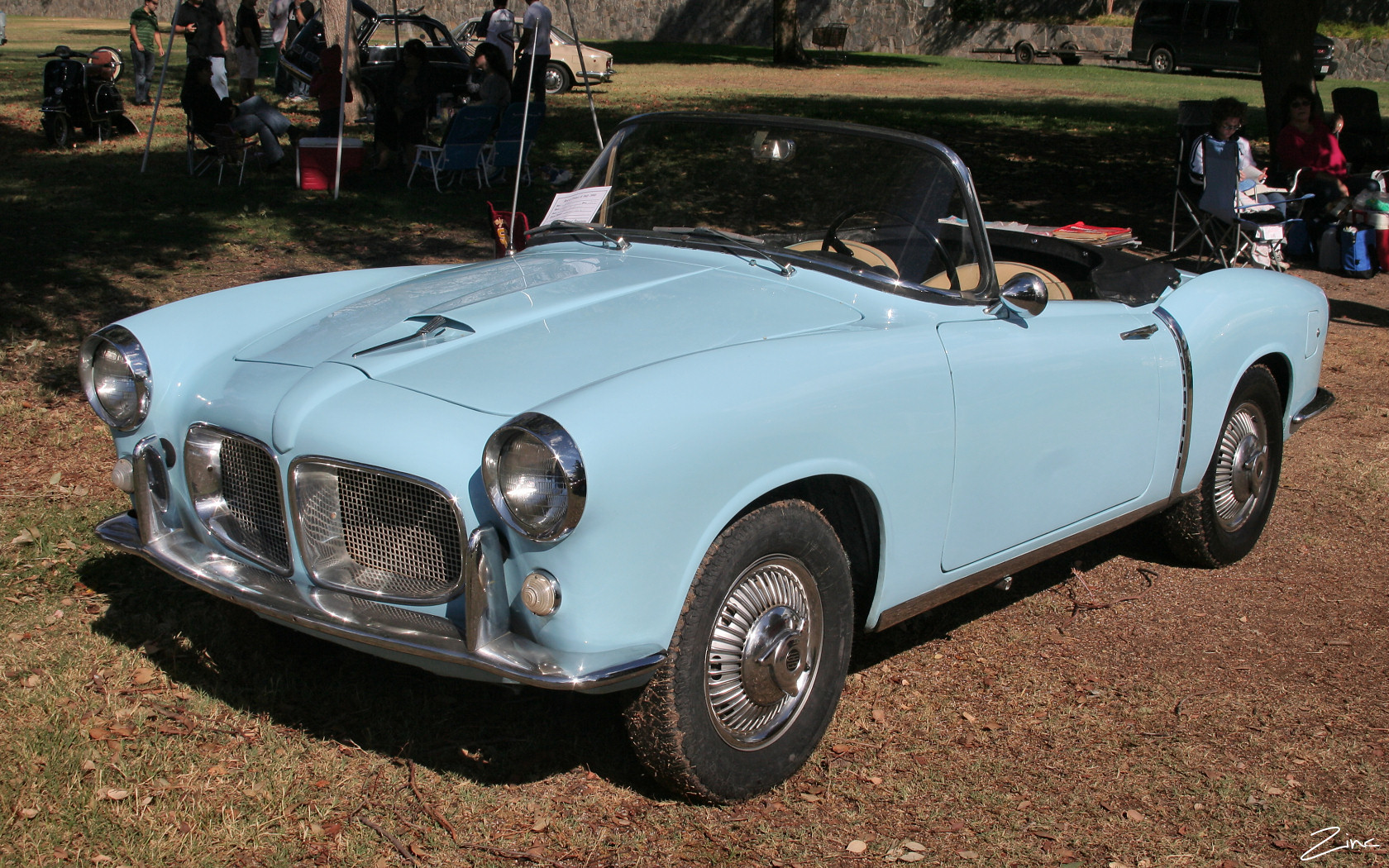

Overview
- Production: 1957–1959
- Designer: Luigi Rapi

Body and chassis
- Class: Sports car
- Body style: 2-door roadster

Dimensions
- Wheelbase: 2,340 mm (92.1 in)

Chronology
- Predecessor: Fiat 1100 TV Trasformabile
- Successor: Fiat 1200 Cabriolet

At the 1957 Turin Motor Show, alongside the Granluce saloon, Fiat also introduced the 1200 TV Trasformabile two-seater roadster. It was an updated Fiat 1100 TV Trasformabile using the 1200 engine, and was called the 1200 Spider in export markets. Exterior changes from the earlier model were minimal, and included new front and rear bumpers with taller over-riders moved further inboards. Inside there was a strip speedometer, and the saloon's steering wheel replaced the wood-rimmed, aluminium-spoked one of the Trasformabile. A novelty feature were swiveling seats, which rotated outwards to facilitate ingress and egress.

== Fiat 1200 Cabriolet ==
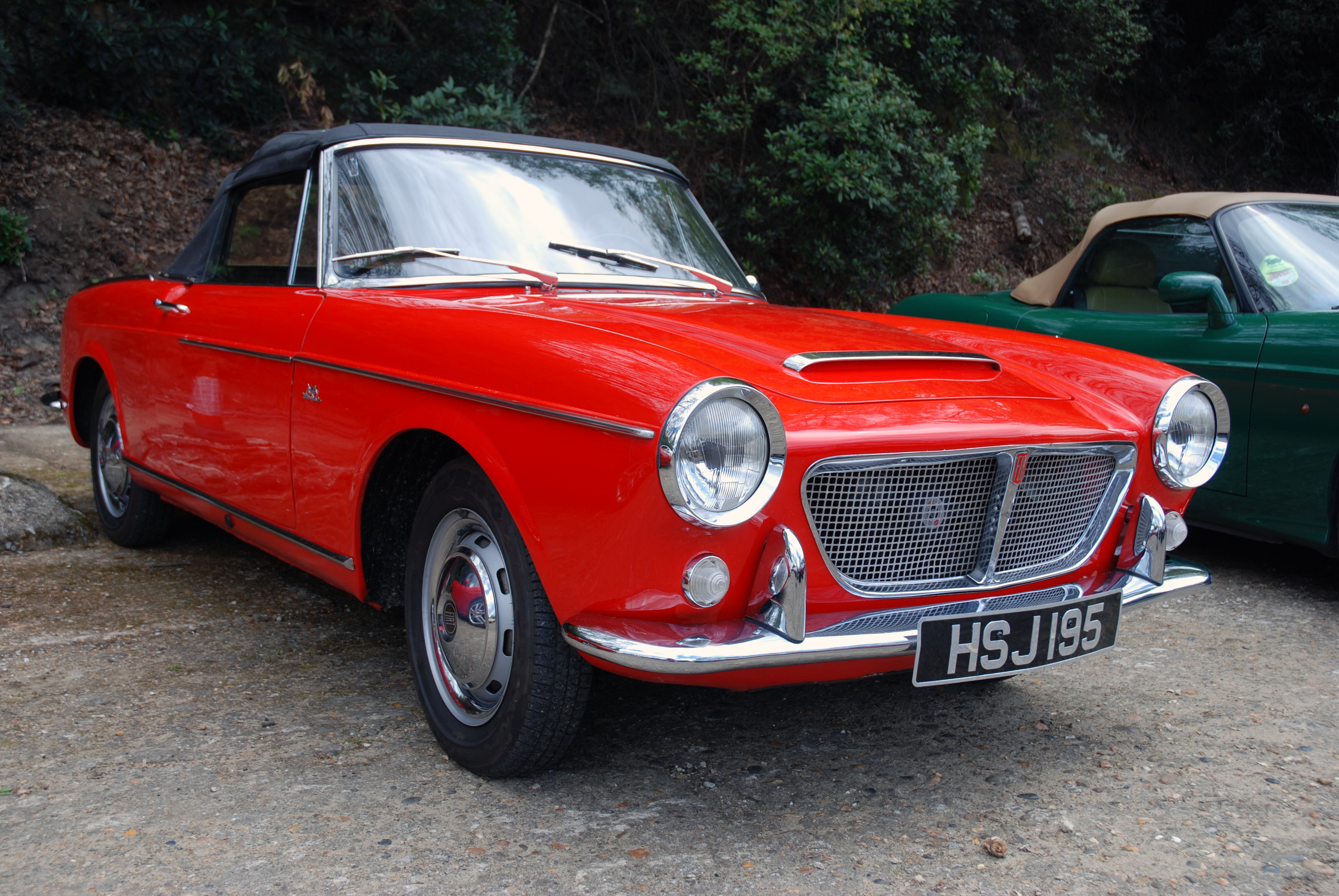
Fiat 1200 Cabriolet

In 1959 the Spider was replaced by the Pininfarina-designed 1200 Cabriolet. Fiat went on to equip this with considerably more powerful engines of 1500 and 1600 cc and to offer a coupé model as well. The final variants remained in production until 1966.
