= Luigi Rapi =

Italian automobile designer

Fabio Luigi Rapi (Florence, 1902- Milan, 197?), was an Italian automobile designer and mechanical engineer. After finishing the Polytechnic University of Milan in 1927, amongst others he worked for OM and Isotta Fraschini.

In 1949 he moved to Fiat, where he started as the assistant-director at the Dipartimento Carrozzerie Derivate e Speciali. After a short stint in 1955-56 at Simca in France (at the time still under Fiat's umbrella), he returned to Turin and set up the Coachwork Design Office, which later became the Fiat Styling Centre under his lead. In addition to the brand Fiat he worked for Autobianchi.

Rapi also was an artist and as such made colour illustrations for the books Le Grandi Fiat by Angelo Tito Anselmi, and Le auto d'oro: evoluzione della carrozzeria dalle origini al 1940 by Francesco Santovetti.

== Notable designs ==
- Isotta Fraschini Tipo 8C Monterosa
- Fiat 1100/103 TV Trasformabile
- Fiat 8V (with Dante Giacosa)
- Fiat Turbina
- Autobianchi Bianchina
- Fiat 1200 TV Spider
- Autobianchi Stellina
- Simca Vedette
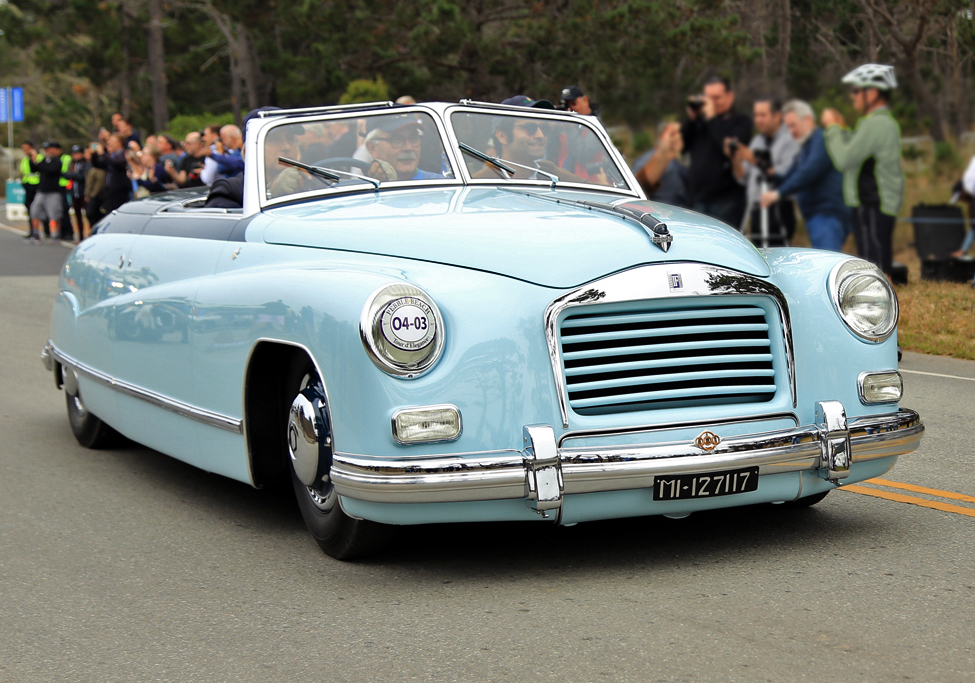
Isotta Fraschini Tipo 8C Monterosa

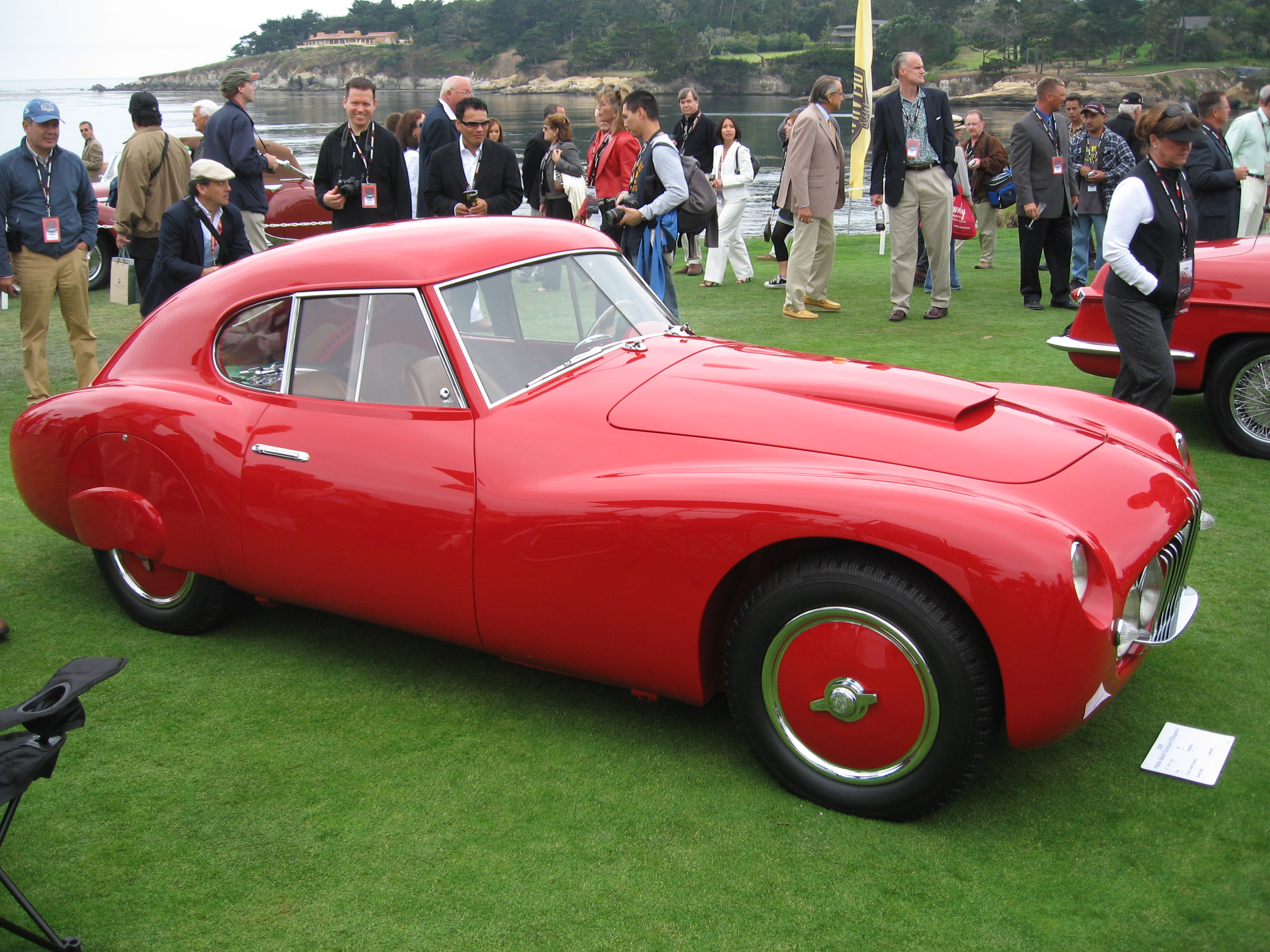
Fiat 8V bodied at Fiat Carrozzerie Speciali

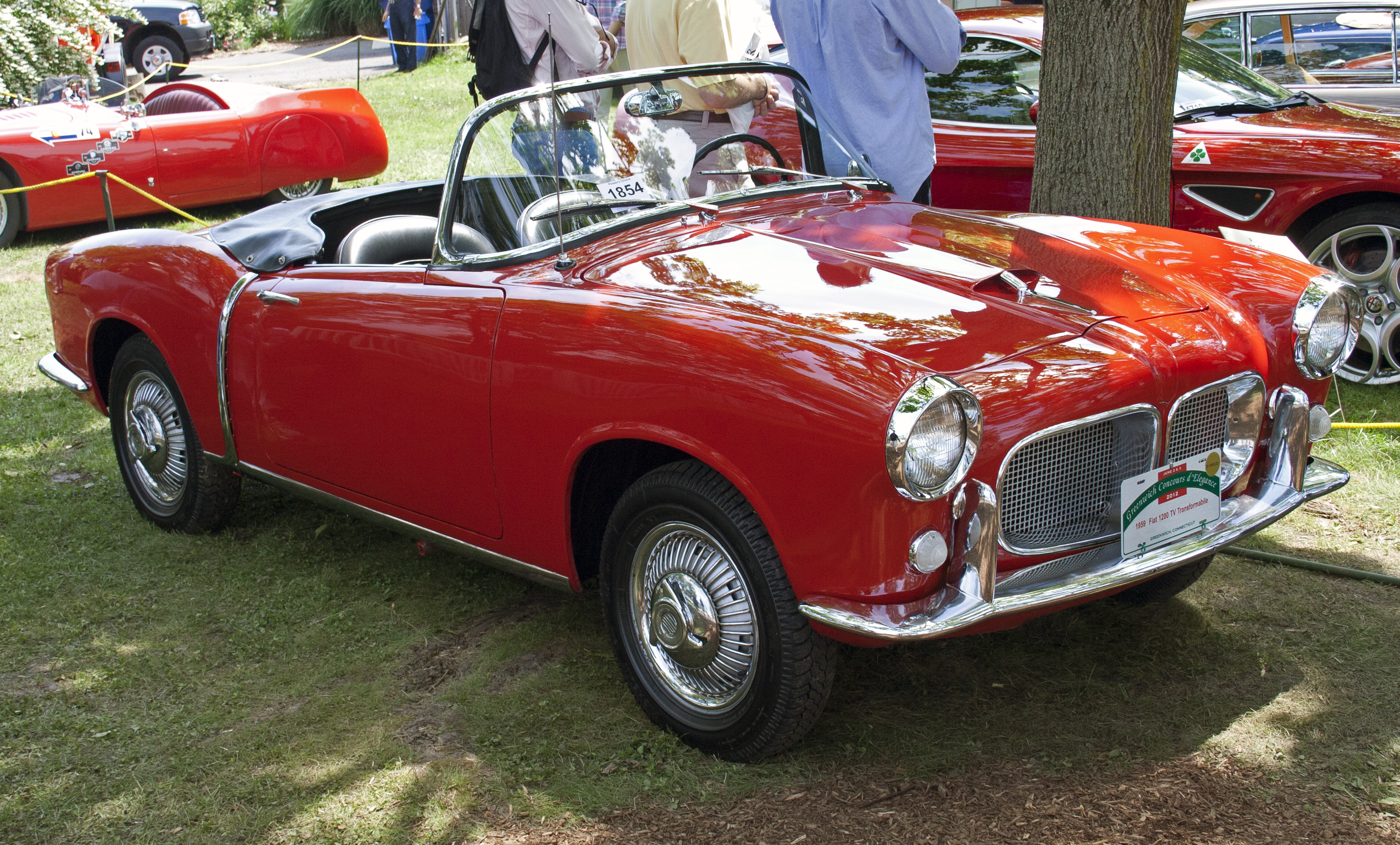
Fiat 1100/103 TV Trasformabile

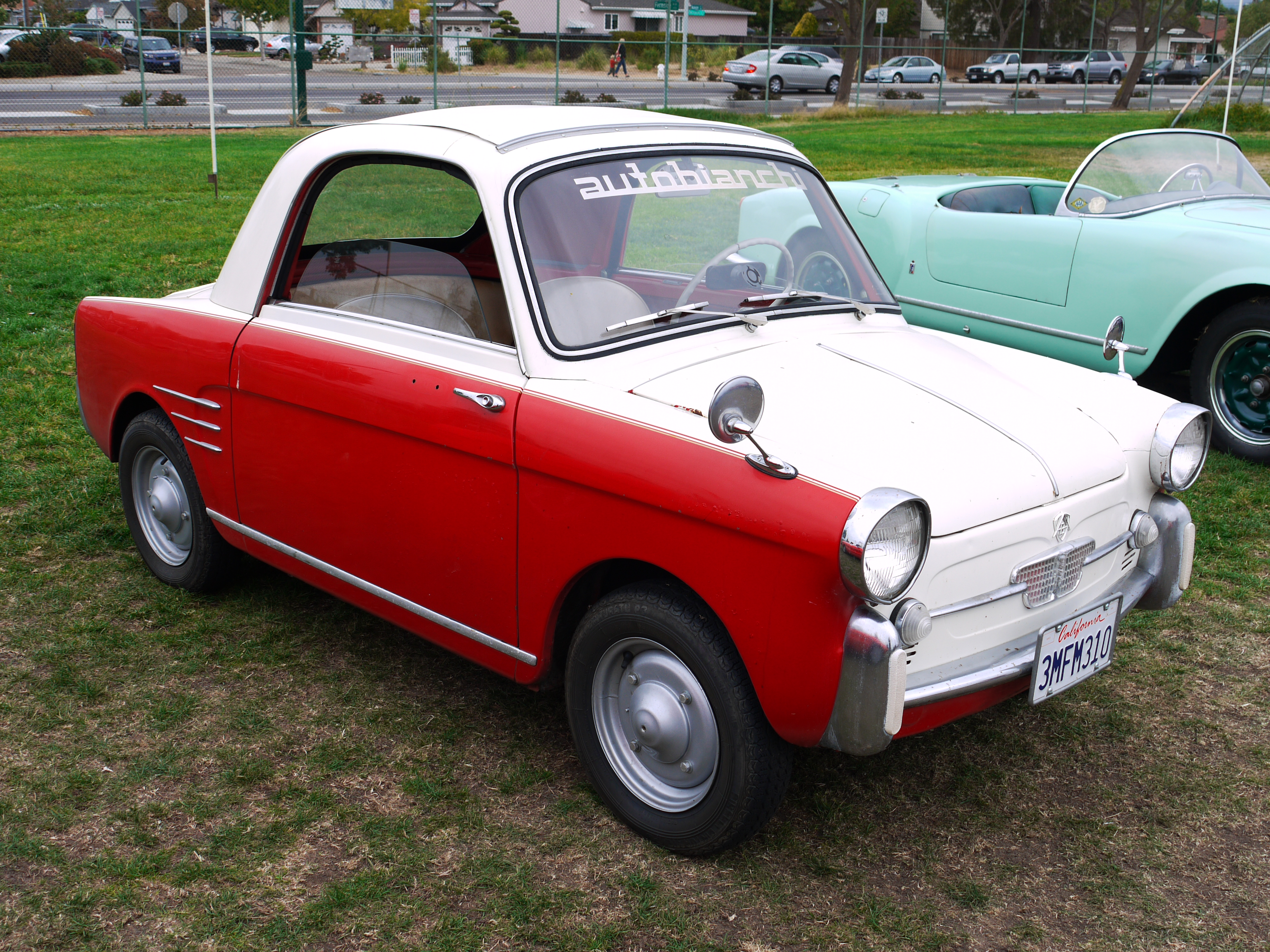
Autobianchi Bianchina Trasformabile

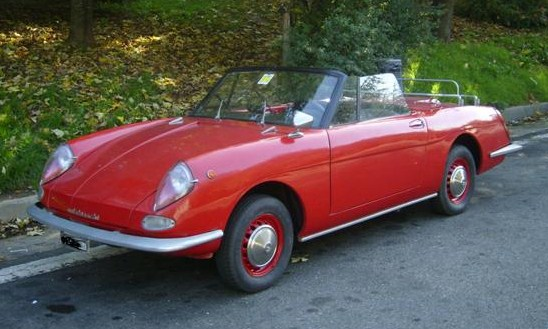
Autobianchi Stellina
