= Fiat 1300 and 1500 =

Fiat 1300 Fiat 1500
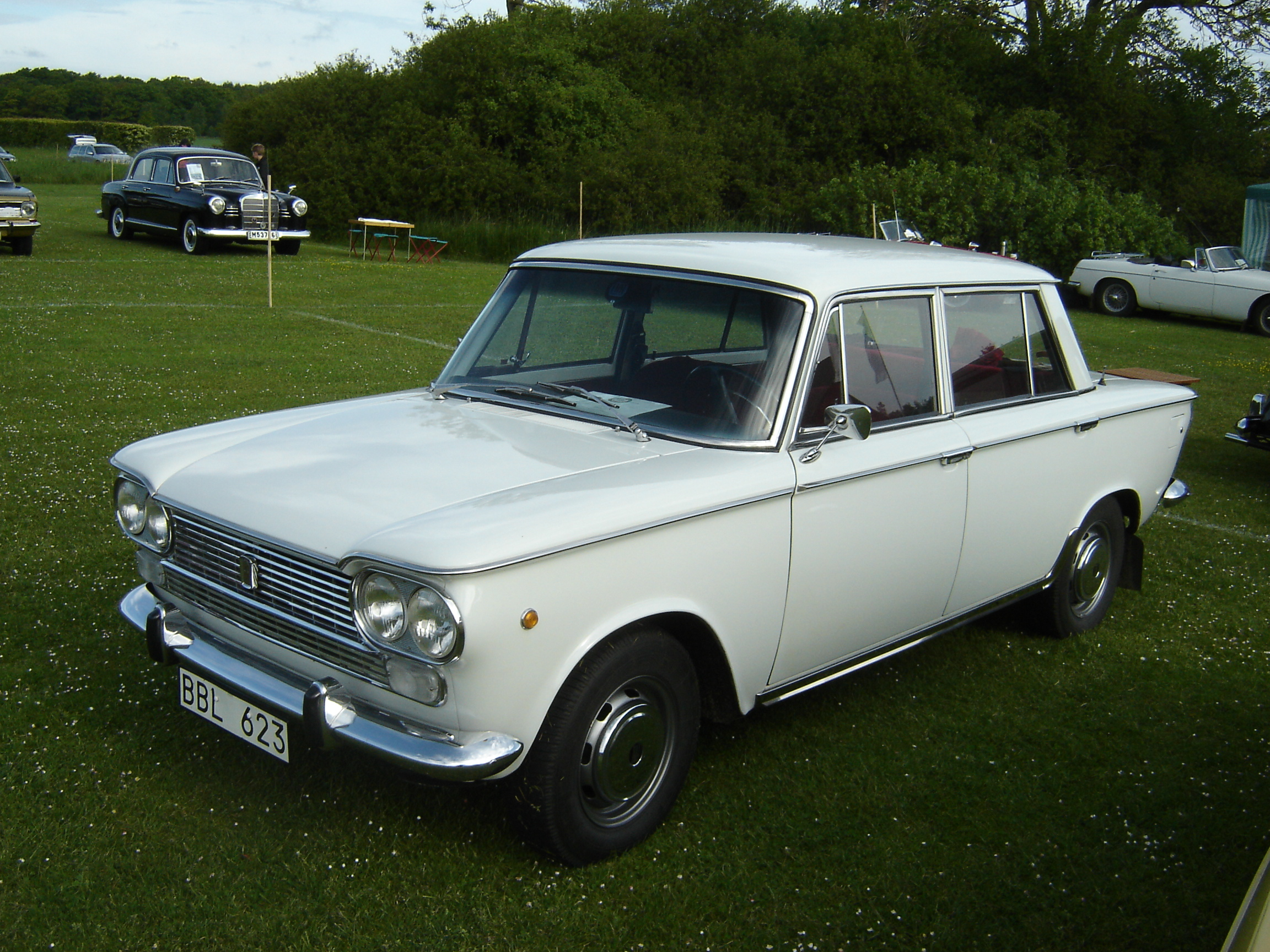
- Fiat 1500

Overview
- Manufacturer: Fiat
- Also called: Zastava 1300; Zastava 1500
- Production: 1961–1972; 1961–1977 (Yugoslavia); 1963–1972 (Argentina)
- Assembly: Italy: Turin; Argentina: Córdoba; Colombia: Bogotá (CCA); Yugoslavia: Kragujevac (Zastava)
- Designer: Mario Boano at Centro Stile Fiat

Body and chassis
- Class: Large family car (D)
- Body style: 4-door saloon; 5-door estate; 2-door cabriolet; 2-door coupé
- Layout: FR layout
- Related: Fiat Pininfarina Cabriolet

Powertrain
- Engine: 1295 cc OHV I4; 1481 cc OHV I4
- Transmission: 4-speed manual all-synchromesh

Dimensions
- Wheelbase: 2,425 mm (95.5 in); 2,505 mm (98.6 in) (1500 C)
- Length: 4,030 mm (158.7 in); 4,130 mm (163 in) (1500 C)
- Width: 1,545 mm (60.8 in)
- Height: 1,365 mm (53.7 in)
- Kerb weight: 960 kg (2,116 lb)

Chronology
- Predecessor: Fiat 1200; Fiat 1400
- Successor: Fiat 124 (1300); Fiat 125 (1500)

The Fiat 1300 and Fiat 1500 are a series of front-engine, rear-drive automobiles manufactured and marketed by Fiat from 1961 to 1972, replacing the Fiat 1400 and Fiat 1200 coupé, spyder and cabriolet. The 1300 and 1500 were essentially identical to each other except for their engine displacement, as indicated by their model names, and were offered in saloon, estate, convertible and coupé body styles which shared little mechanically with the other body styles except the 1500 engine.

The 1500 offered a 75 hp engine, lightweight construction, front disc brakes and rear alloy drum brakes.

The 1300/1500 and their derivatives were also assembled by Yugoslavia's Zastava and Fiat's German subsidiary, Neckar Automobil AG, as well as in South Africa. The floorpan of the 1500 C was used as a basis for the 1500s replacement, the Fiat 125, while another model, the Polski Fiat 125p, made by the Polish FSO, was created by mating the body of 125 and mechanicals (engines, gearbox, transmission, suspension) of 1300/1500. In the Italian range, the 1300 was replaced by the Fiat 124 in 1966, and the 1500 by the Fiat 125 a year later.

In total, 1,900,000 units were produced worldwide.

== Design ==
The 1300/1500 were conventional cars, with longitudinally, front-mounted engines powering the rear axle via a four-speed manual transmission with a column gearchange. The engines employed were two versions of the same design, differing mainly in bore:

- Fiat 1300 – 1295 cc (bore 72 x stroke 79.5 mm) OHV 4-cyl inline 60 hp (45 kW; 61 PS) at 5000 rpm
- Fiat 1500 – 1481 cc (bore 77 x stroke 79.5 mm) OHV 4-cyl inline 73 hp (54 kW; 74 PS) at 5400 rpm

Both engines had alloy cylinder heads with twin rocker shafts and inlet valves angled at 45 degrees. The 1300 and 1500 engines were a variant of the six-cylinder engines of the Fiat 1800 and 2100, with two less cylinders. Because of the shared design and components, Fiat saved a lot of money and development time.

An innovative feature at the time was the fitting of disc brakes on the front.

Both variants started with a wheelbase of 2,425 mm (95.5 in), but from 1964 the wheelbase of Fiat 1500 was increased to 2,505 mm (98.6 in). This longer version was called the 1500 C and also received three more horsepower (for a total of 75) and various other detail differences, including power brakes and bigger taillights with built-in reverse lamps.

The Pininfarina-designed Coupé and Cabriolet models of the preceding 1200 continued with largely unchanged bodywork, although they were now equipped with the larger 1.5 litre engine. The O.S.C.A. engined 1600 S Coupé and Cabriolet also continued to be available. All of the coupés and convertibles were replaced by the new 124 coupés and spiders in 1966.

The New Zealand importer, Torino Motors, marketed the 1500 as the "Crusader", with corresponding badging. In South Africa, dealers could also supply the "1500 OTS", a conversion for more power available in two different stages. The OTS was developed by CMI (Cartoria Motor Industries) specifically to suit local production car competition regulations. Rather than the standard car's 83 bhp (62 kW) SAE, the OTS developed 96 and 108 bhp (72 and 81 kW) SAE in the respective Stage I and Stage II variants. A variety of extras were also offered, including lowered suspension and a conversion to a floor-mounted shifter.

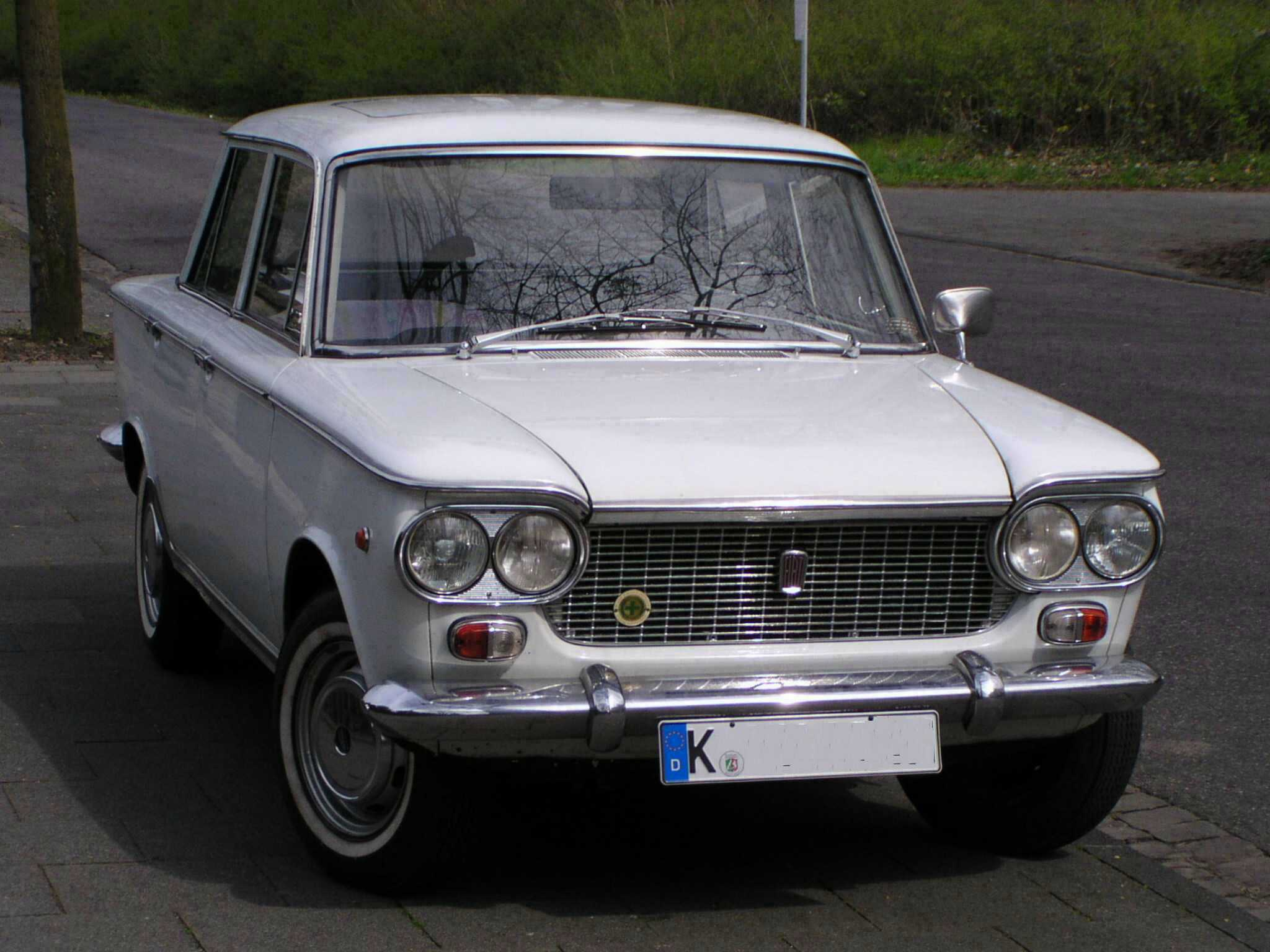
Fiat 1300 - front fascia

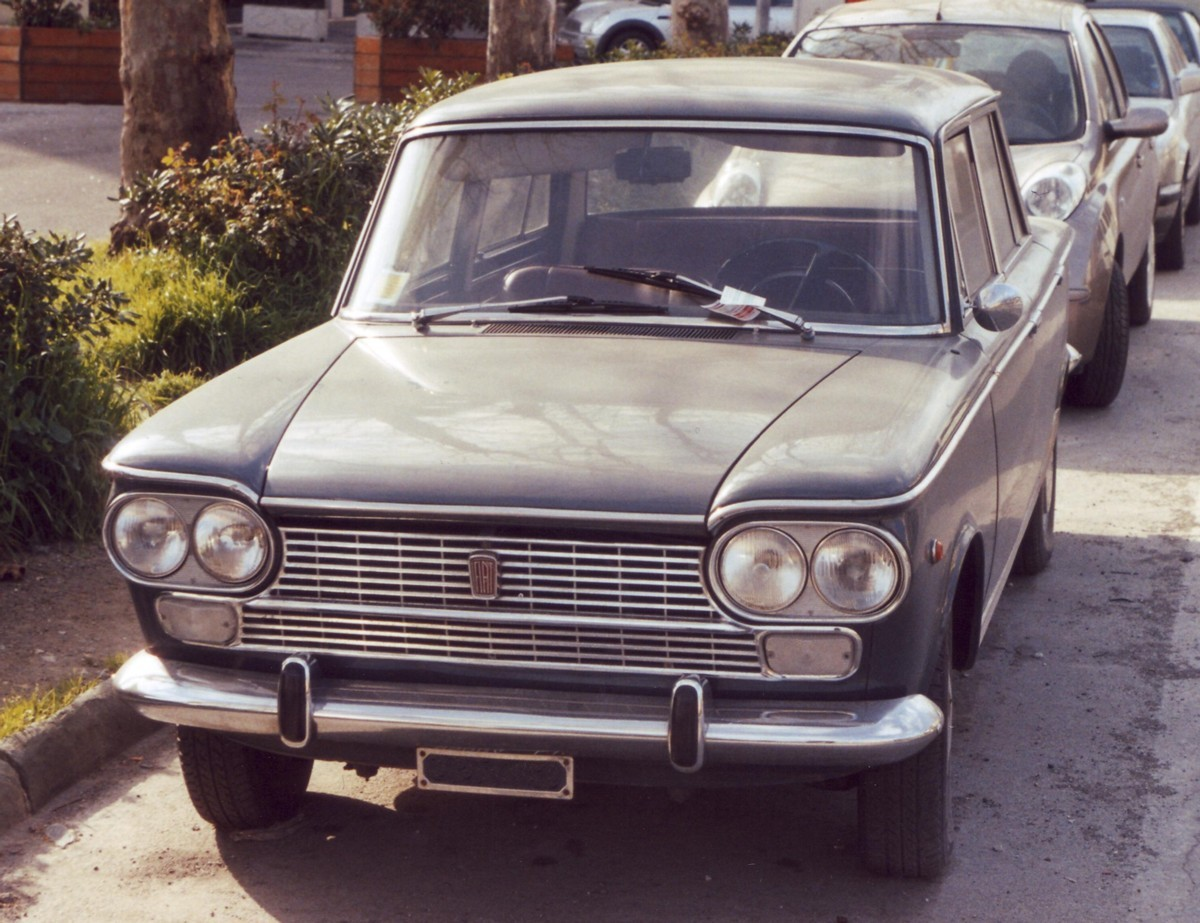
Fiat 1500 C - front fascia

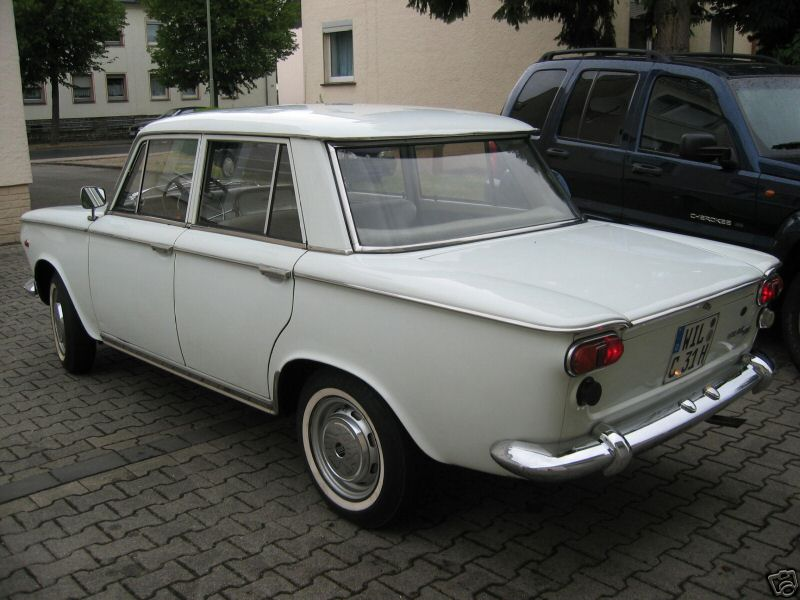
1965 Fiat 1300 rear

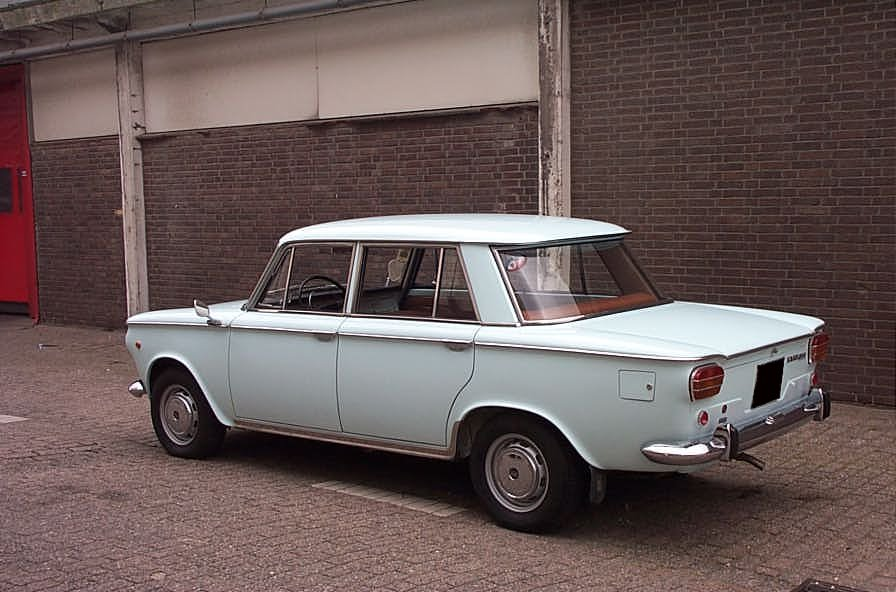
1966 Fiat 1500 C rear

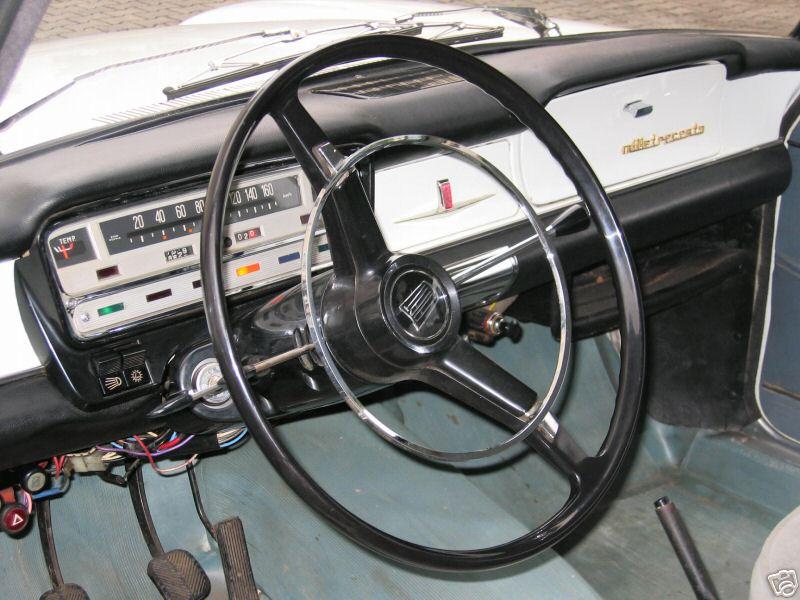
1965 Fiat 1300 interior

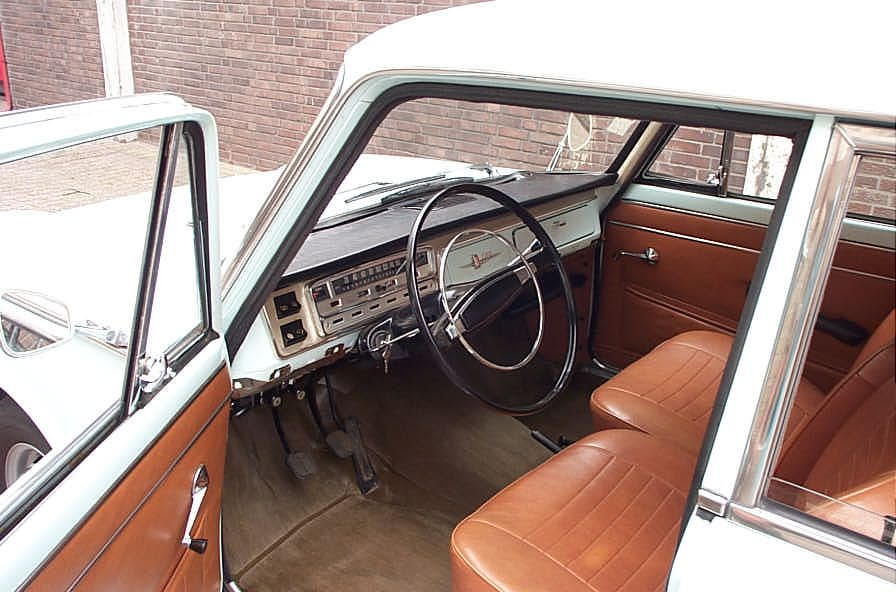
1966 Fiat 1500 C interior

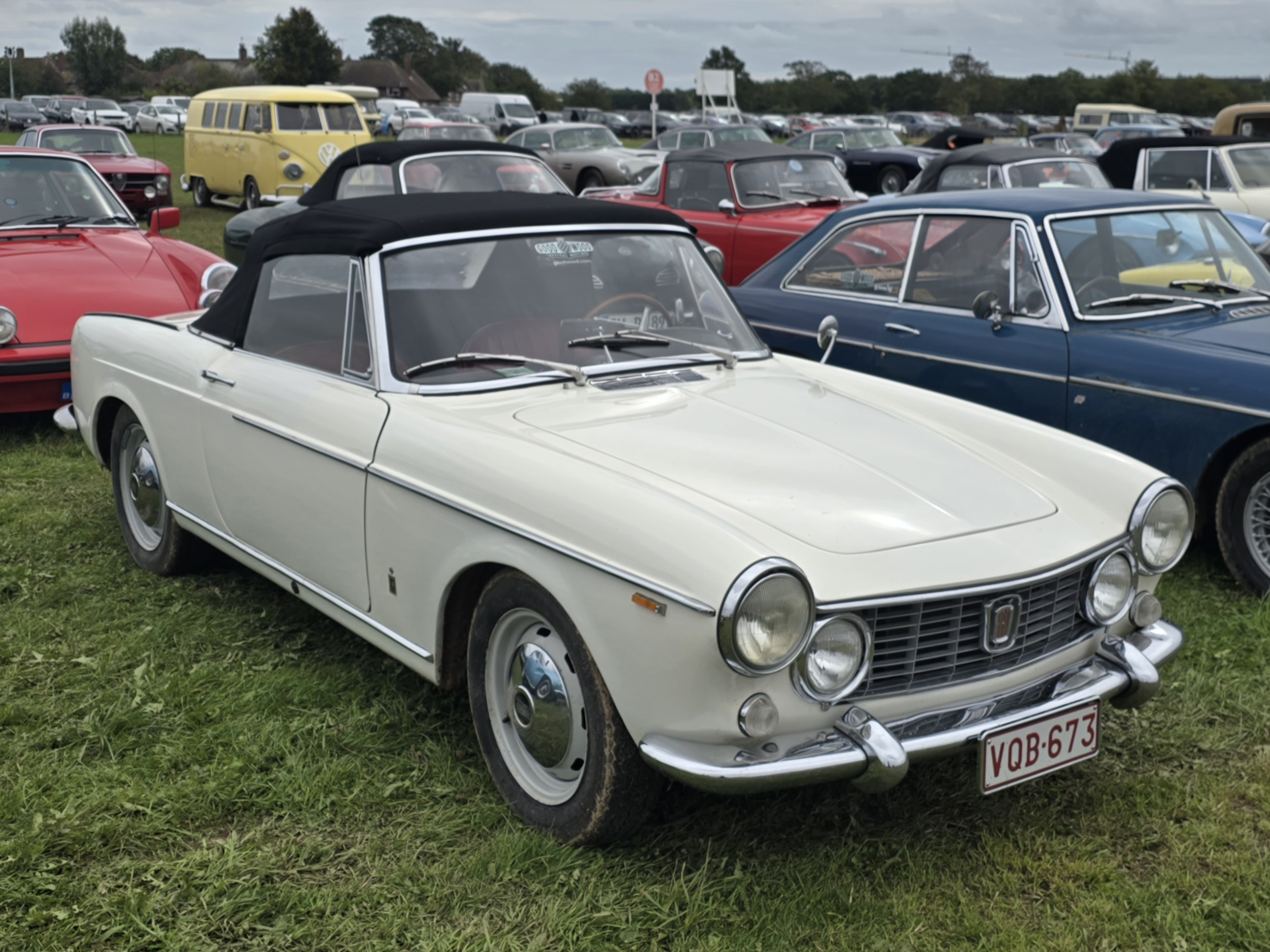
Fiat 1500 Cabriolet

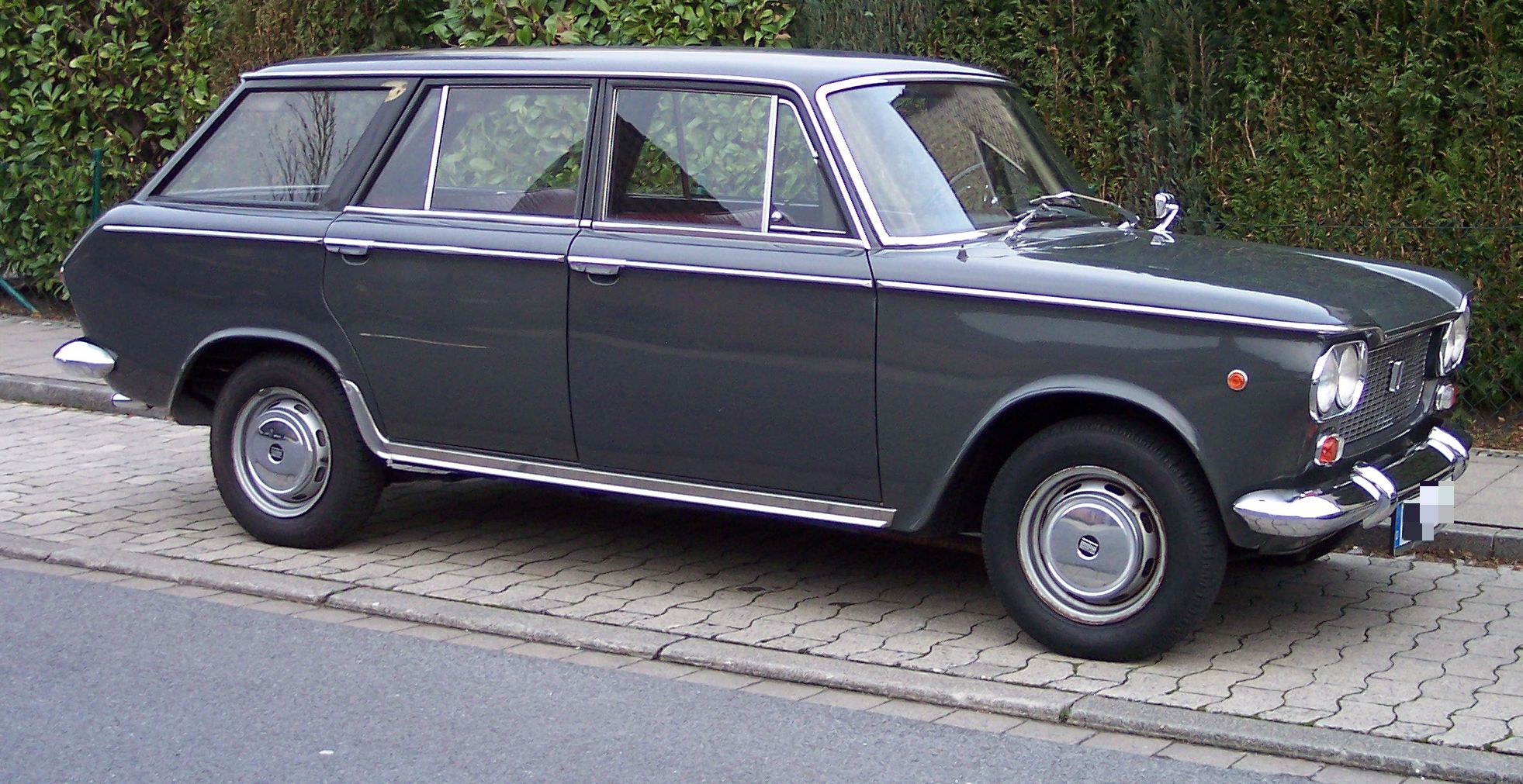
Fiat 1300 Familiare

== Fiat 1500 L / 1500 Taxi ==
The 1500 L is essentially a Fiat 1800 fitted with the 1500 engine, with the "L" added to distinguish it from the more compact, unrelated model. The Taxi version debuted in 1962 and had the engine detuned to 60 hp (45 kW). The 1500 L (for "Lunga" – Italian for "long") originally had the same 72 PS (53 kW) engine as the regular 1500, and in 1964 was upgraded to 75 PS (55 kW) along with the Fiat 1500 C.

The 1500 L was also built in Barcelona as the SEAT 1500, where 183,652 were produced between 1963 and 1975. SEAT simply called it the 1500 without a disambiguator as the 1300/1500 was not available from them.

== Other versions ==
=== Siata 1500 TS ===
Siata, the Italian tuning accessories and special vehicles manufacturer, devised a model called TS or 1500 TS that differed from the regular Fiat saloon in styling details, including two-tone paint, but mainly in the fact that the engine was tuned to deliver as much as 94 bhp (70 kW). Moreover, there was a 1500 TS Coupé version with a unique body designed by Giovanni Michelotti. Both the saloon and the coupé were also manufactured by Fiat's German subsidiary, Neckar Automobil AG, formerly known as NSU-Fiat, located in Heilbronn (unlike regular Fiat 1300/1500).

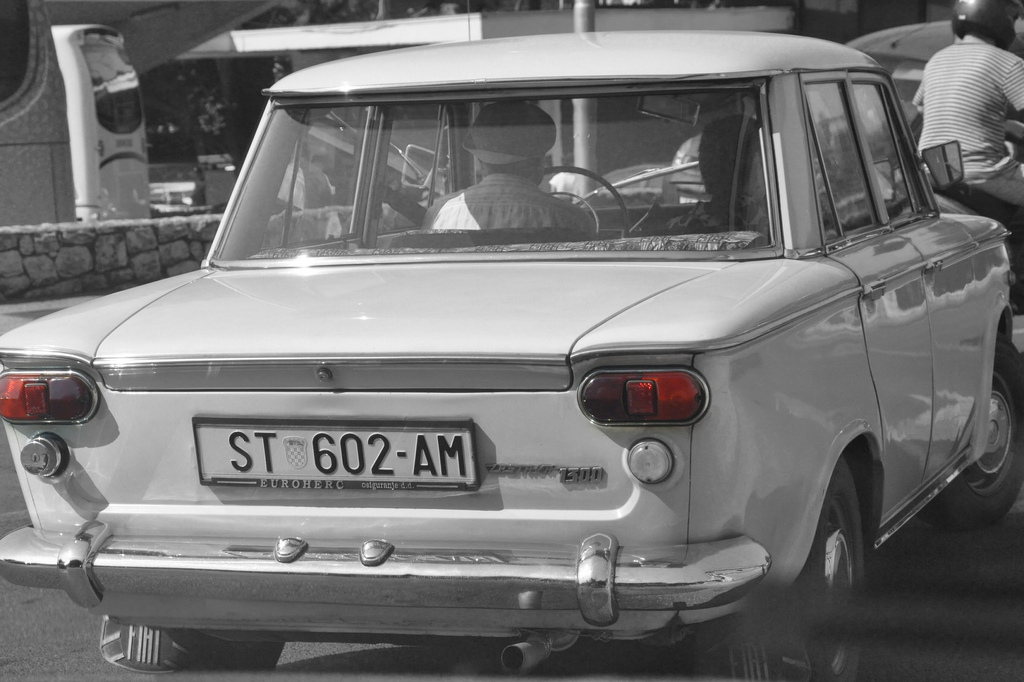
Zastava 1300 in Croatia

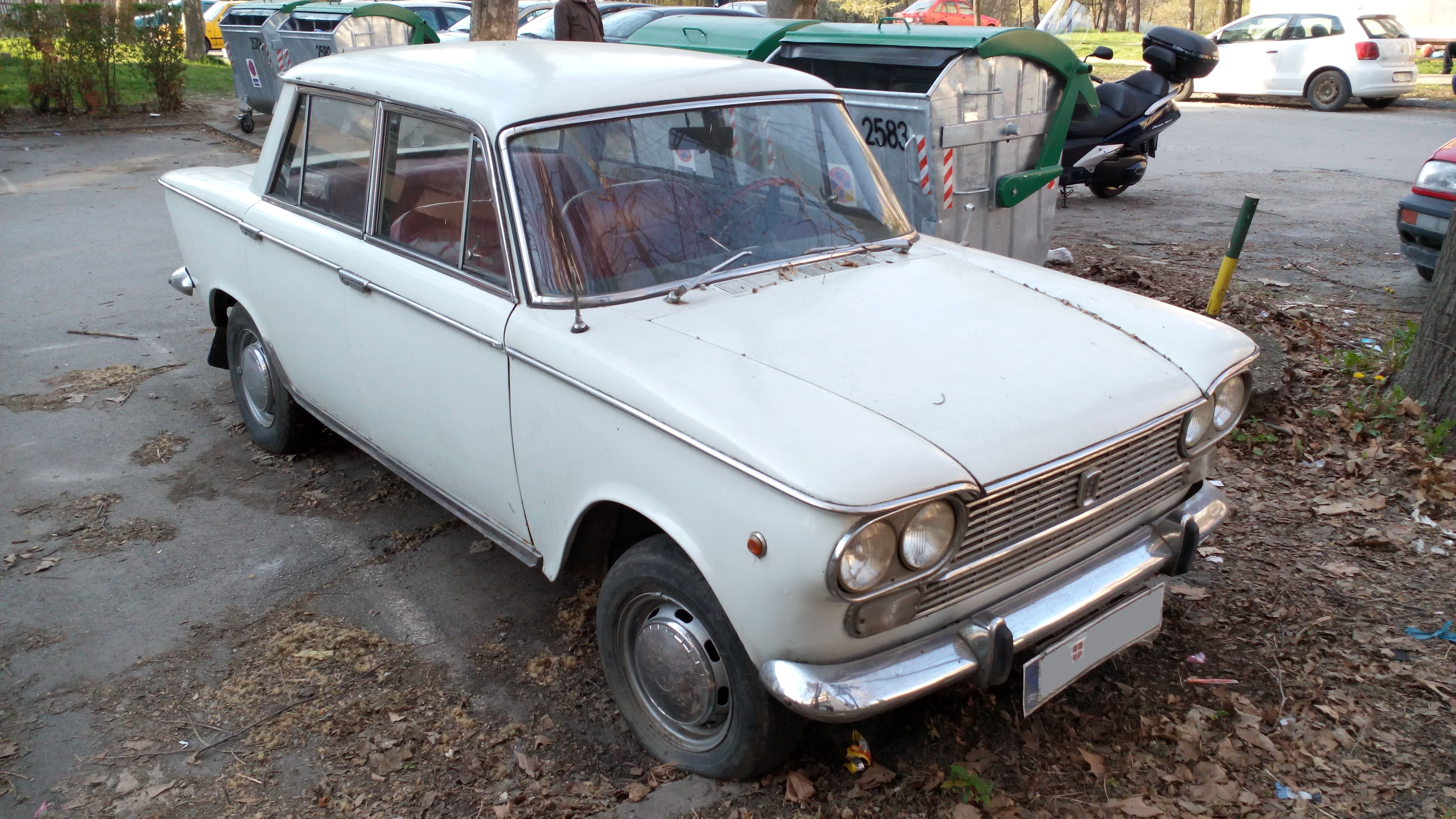
Zastava 1300 Luxe in Kragujevac, Serbia

=== Zastava 1300 and 1500 ===
The Yugoslav automaker Zastava, which was extensively cooperating with Fiat, also assembled the 1300 and 1500, branding them as Zastava 1300 and Zastava 1500, respectively. Zastava went on to produce the 1300 by itself when Fiat in 1967 stopped production. During the seventies better equipment was added and models named DeLuxe and 1300E. The production finished in December 1979. 201,160 copies were made since 1961. The car was nicknamed Tristać (trista means 300 in Serbian language.). The saloon model in the Zastava's version is the same as in the Fiat's version, but the estate model is different. This model is used as the foundation of the Fiat 1300/1500's successor, Fiat 124.

With all-around disc brakes, rear-wheel drive, up to 72 horsepower (the engine could propel the car to a top speed of 155 km/h), the elegant Tristać was Yugoslavia's favorite upmarket car. The Zastava 1300 was also assembled by Leonidas Lara (C.C.A.) in Bogotá, Colombia. Assembly of Zastavas in Colombia began as early as 1969.

=== Argentinian Fiat 1500 ===
For South American market Fiat Concord in Buenos Aires from 1963 produced a 1500 version. This was Seat of Spain which made available as "Berlina", "Familiar," and in a pick-up version with three seats in the front row named "Multicarga". A total of 123,059 examples were produced. A Vignale-bodied coupé version, very rare in Europe, was more common in Argentina where 5,228 units were built between 1966 and 1970. These four-seater coupés differed in minor ways from the Vignale coupés built in Italy and provided the basis for the 1969 1600 Sport, a fastback coupé that eventually developed into the Argentina-only 125 Sport. These later versions no longer required Fiat Concord to pay (steep) royalties to Vignale. The 1600 received an enlarged version of the 1500s engine, displacing 1625 cc.

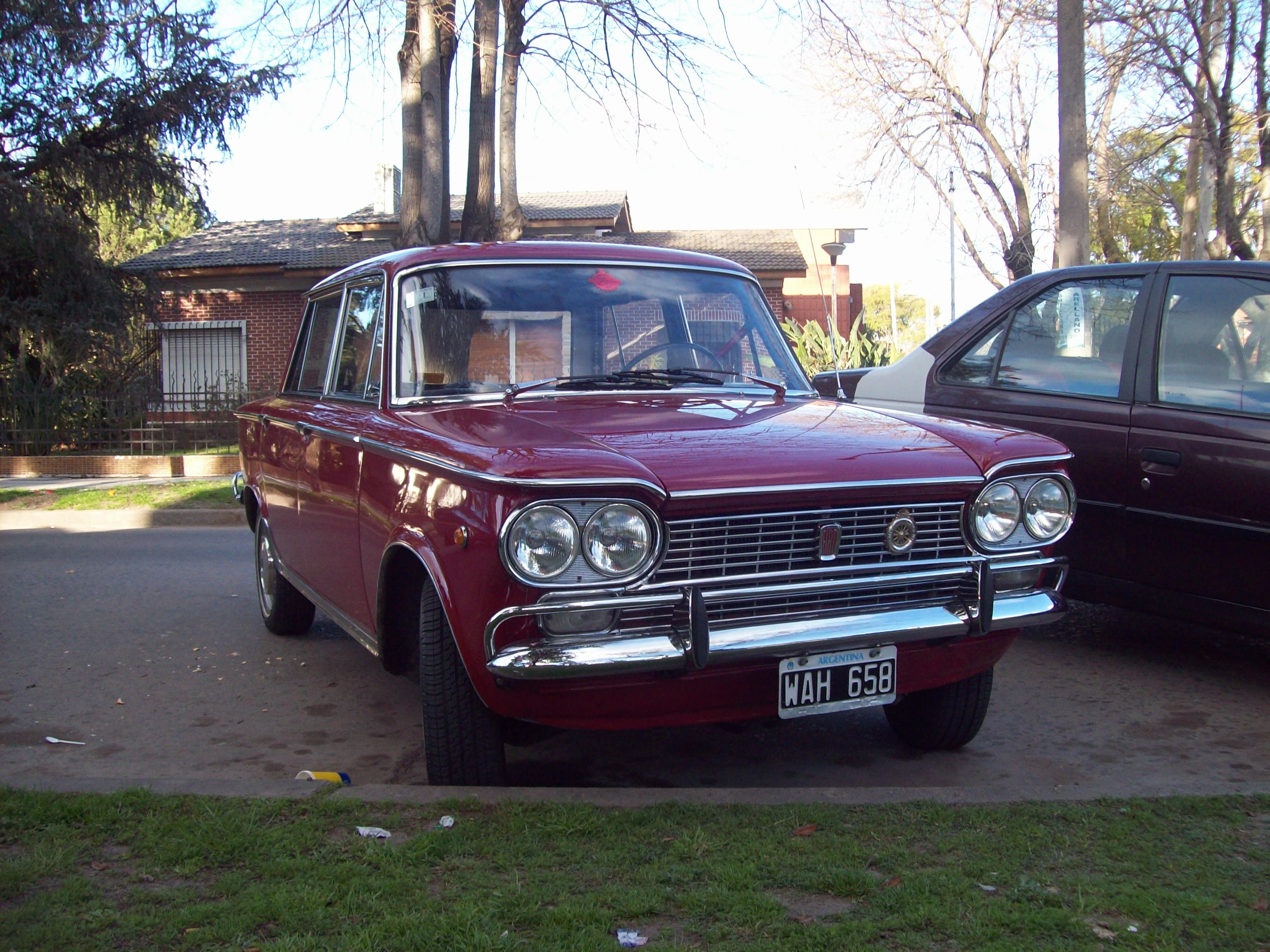
Argentinian-made Fiat 1500

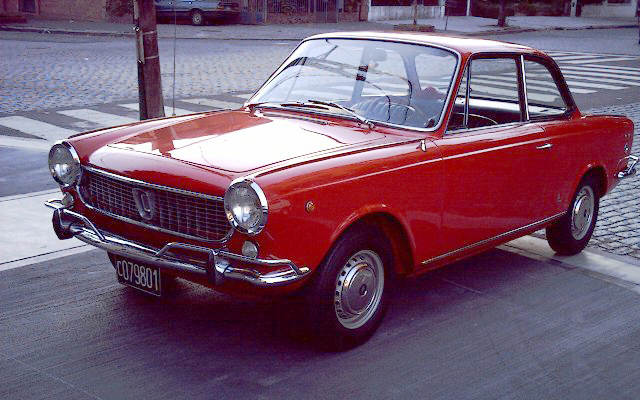
Fiat 1500 Coupé Vignale

=== Polski Fiat 125p ===
Although considered a variant of Fiat 125, the Polski Fiat 125p was actually a combination of bodywork of Fiat 125 and engines and mechanicals of Fiat 1300/1500.
