= Fiat Pininfarina Cabriolet =

Fiat 1200/1500/1600 Cabriolet and Coupé
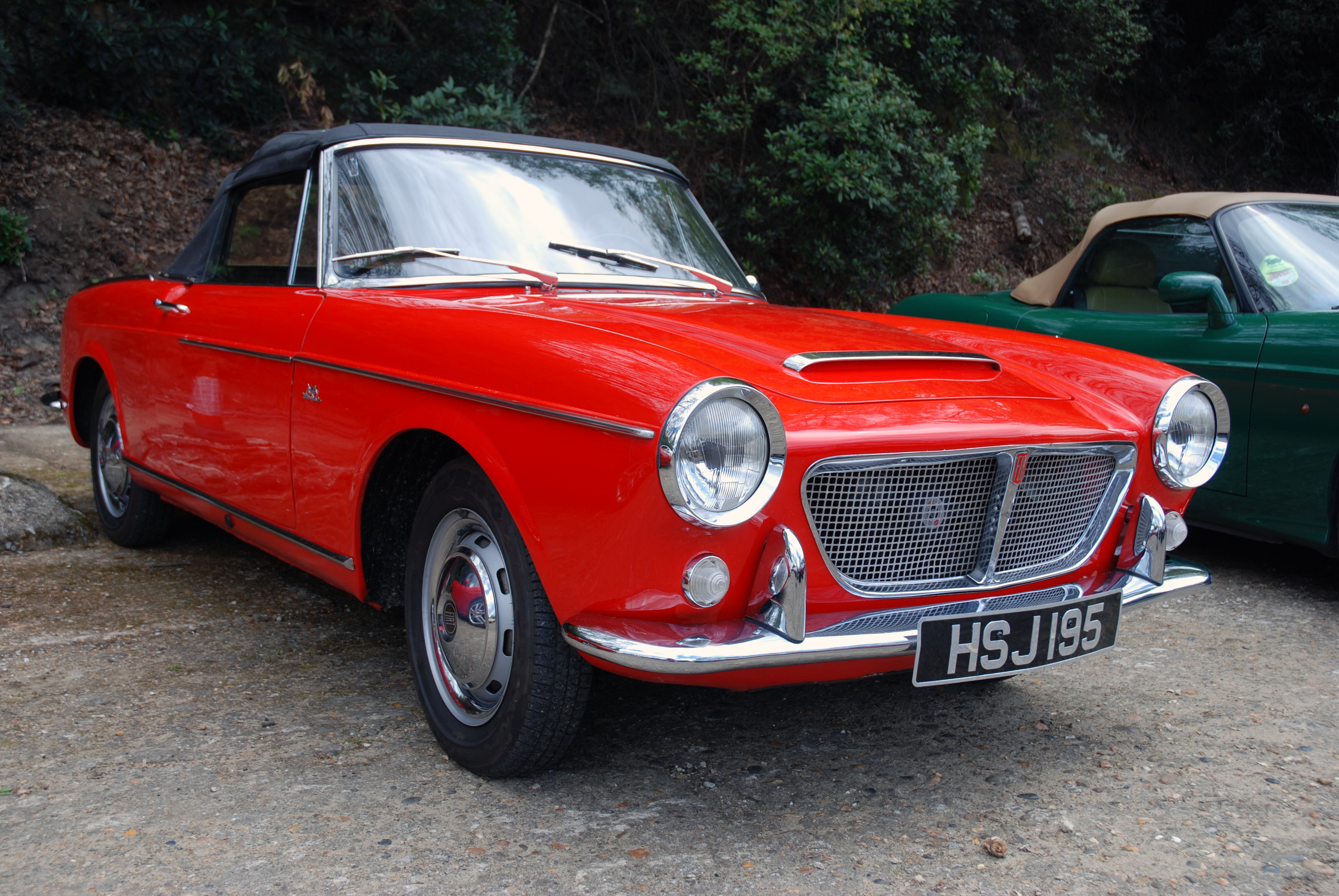

Overview
- Manufacturer: Fiat; Pinin Farina
- Production: 1959–1966
- Designer: Pinin Farina

Body and chassis
- Class: Sports car
- Body style: 2-door convertible 2-door coupé
- Layout: FR layout
- Related: Fiat 1200; Fiat 1300 and 1500

Powertrain
- Transmission: 4-speed manual (1959-1965); 5-speed manual (1965-1966)

Dimensions
- Wheelbase: 2,340 mm (92.1 in)
- Length: 4,030–4,060 mm (158.7–159.8 in)
- Width: 1,520 mm (59.8 in)
- Height: 1,300 mm (51.2 in)
- Kerb weight: 905–1,050 kg (1,995–2,315 lb)

Chronology
- Predecessor: Fiat 1200 Spider/Trasformabile
- Successor: Fiat 124 Sport Spider

The Fiat Pininfarina Cabriolet (tipo 118G) is a two-door sports car which was manufactured by Pinin Farina and marketed by Fiat across two generations (1959-1963, 1963-1966). It is a two-seater convertible with a front-engine, rear-wheel-drive layout and superseded the Fiat 1200 Spider.

By the end of manufacture in 1966 total production had reached 34,211, with the figures of the sporting 1500 S and 1600 S versions (equipped with OSCA built twin cam engines) making up 3,089 of that total. The Cabriolet was superseded by the Fiat 124 Sport Spider, introduced in 1966.

== First generation ==
=== 1200 Cabriolet ===
Pininfarina had shown a similar, OSCA-powered convertible called the Fiat-OSCA 1500 GT at the 1958 Turin Motor Show. Production models received the same 1221 cc OHV engine as the earlier 1200 TV Trasformabile/Spider, albeit somewhat more powerful, with 59 CV (43 kW). The two-seat 1200 Cabriolet also retained the chassis of the 1200 TV Trasformabile. Front suspension is independent with coil and wishbone, combined with a live, leaf sprung rear axle. The first units built of the 1200 Cabriolet came without separate wind deflector windows in the doors and without side indicators in the front fenders, but those details were added after a few months of production.

=== 1500 S/1600 S ===
The 1200 was not fast enough to be considered a sports car, so Fiat decided to take a short cut to this market by using OSCA's existing twin cam engine design. Chief engineer Dante Giacosa got in contact with OSCA in a July 1957 meeting with Ernesto Maserati. The Maserati brothers could not raise the funds to start series production for their engine, which they wanted to sell to racing teams, and therefore asked Fiat for help. The Tipo 118 engine was a close relative of the 1500 tipo nuovo (TN) unit fitted to the OSCA MT4 racing car (as well as the later road-going OSCA 1600 GT2 and SP), fitted with chain-driven twin camshafts. Fiat adapted the design of the engine to its needs - now with a cast-iron rather than the original aluminium block - and took over production at its Mirafiori factory. OSCA bought engines built by Fiat for their own purposes, and fettled those units further. In November 1959 the 1500 Cabriolet appeared with the OSCA-designed, 1491 cc engine, fitted with twin Weber carburetors and developing 80 CV (59 kW) [90 hp SAE]. The new model was called the Fiat 1500 Cabriolet (tipo 118S) and received a wider (non-functional) air scoop on the bonnet, a tachometer, as well as the larger drum brakes from the larger 1800/2100 saloons, and 15-inch wheels. In July 1960 the name was changed to "Fiat 1500 S Cabriolet," and it now had disc brakes front and rear. About 1000 of the OSCA-engined 1500/1500 S models were built.

In mid-1962 this engine was replaced with one bored out by 2 mm to 1568 cc. The twin-cam four of the 1600 S (tipo 118SA) had 90 CV DIN (66 kW) [100 hp SAE]. These cars received a distinctive, asymmetric air intake until 1963 when the 1600 S was facelifted while the 1200 was replaced by the pushrod-engined 1500 Cabriolet.

The Pininfarina Spider's convertible top could be operated by one person from inside of the car, and was completely hidden by a leather and cloth apron when down. Period reviewers complemented the Fiat on its thoughtful equipment, ease of operation, "delightful" driving characteristics, and economical engine. Negatives were minor: the side windows fouled the convertible top when up, folding the driver's seat forward could accidentally trigger the horn button, and the steering wheel partially obscured the view of the forward fender.

In 1960 Pininfarina presented a coupé version of the 1500 Cabriolet. This model, built in small numbers and sold by Pininfarina themselves, received a smaller windscreen as well as a shortened bootlid to accommodate the larger rear window. The grille was in one piece, as in the cabriolet prototype and contrary to the split grille of the production Fiat. The coupé remained a strict two-seater and continued to be built with the 1600 engine after the range was facelifted in 1963. Fiat also offered a removable hardtop for the Cabriolets.

=== Abarth 1600 Spider ===
Abarth built a very small series of roadsters, fitted with the OSCA twin-cam engine and Michelotti-designed, Allemano-built bodywork similar to that used for the company's larger 2200 Spider. Presented at the 1959 Turin Show, sources estimate no more than three examples were built.

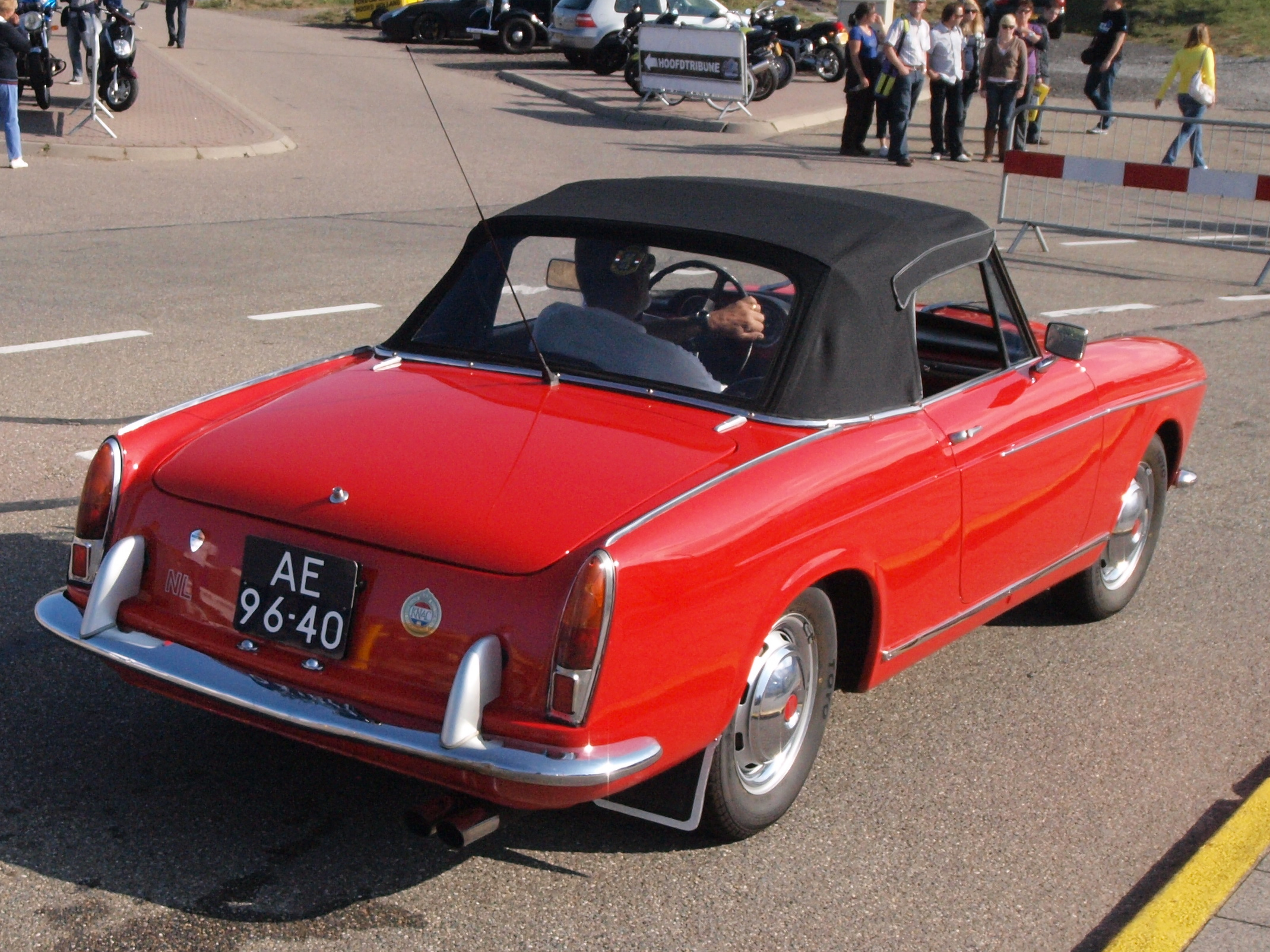
1962 Fiat 1200 Cabriolet (rear)

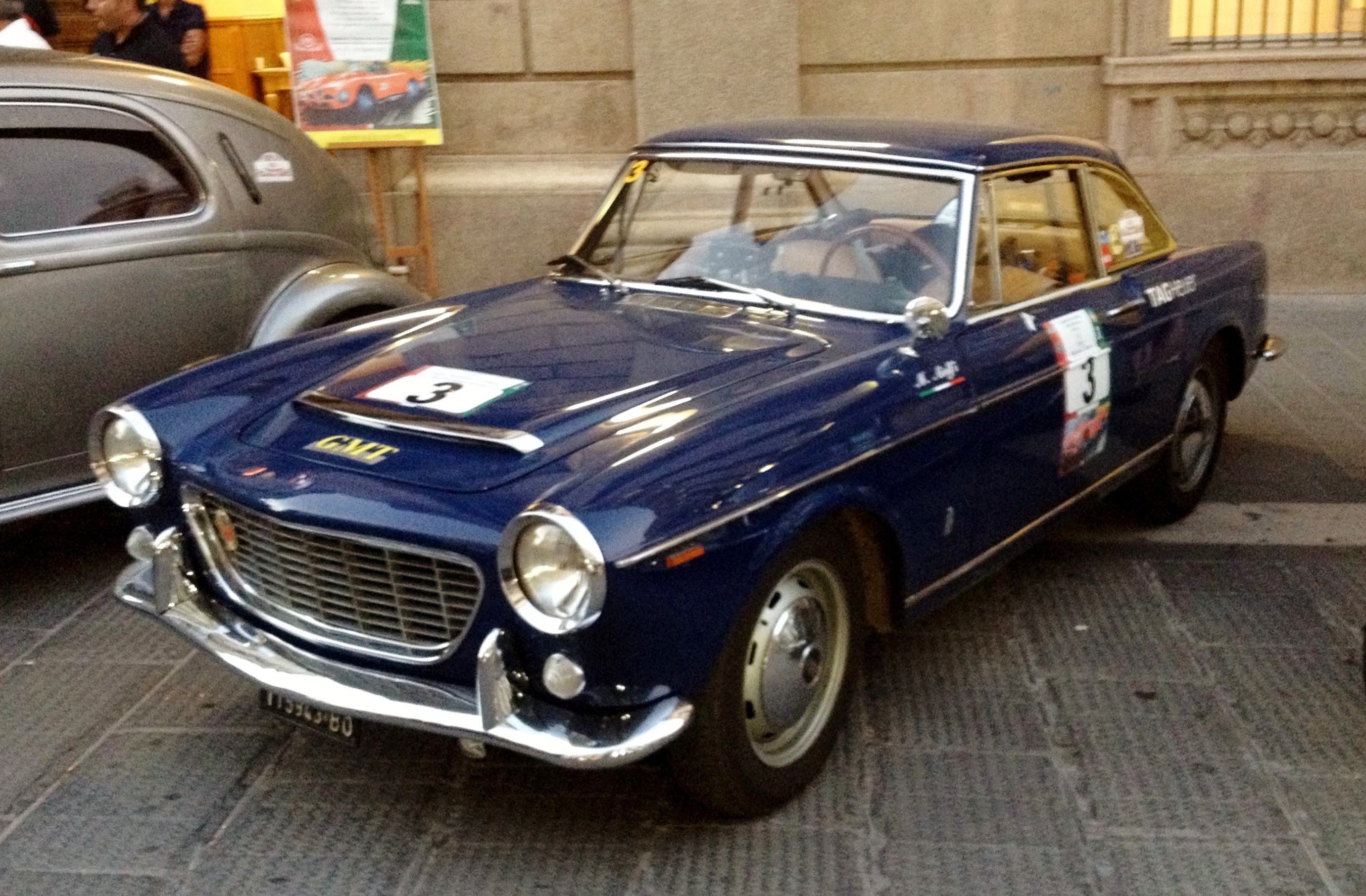
Fiat 1500 S Coupé, with the O.S.C.A. twin cam engine (tipo 118S)

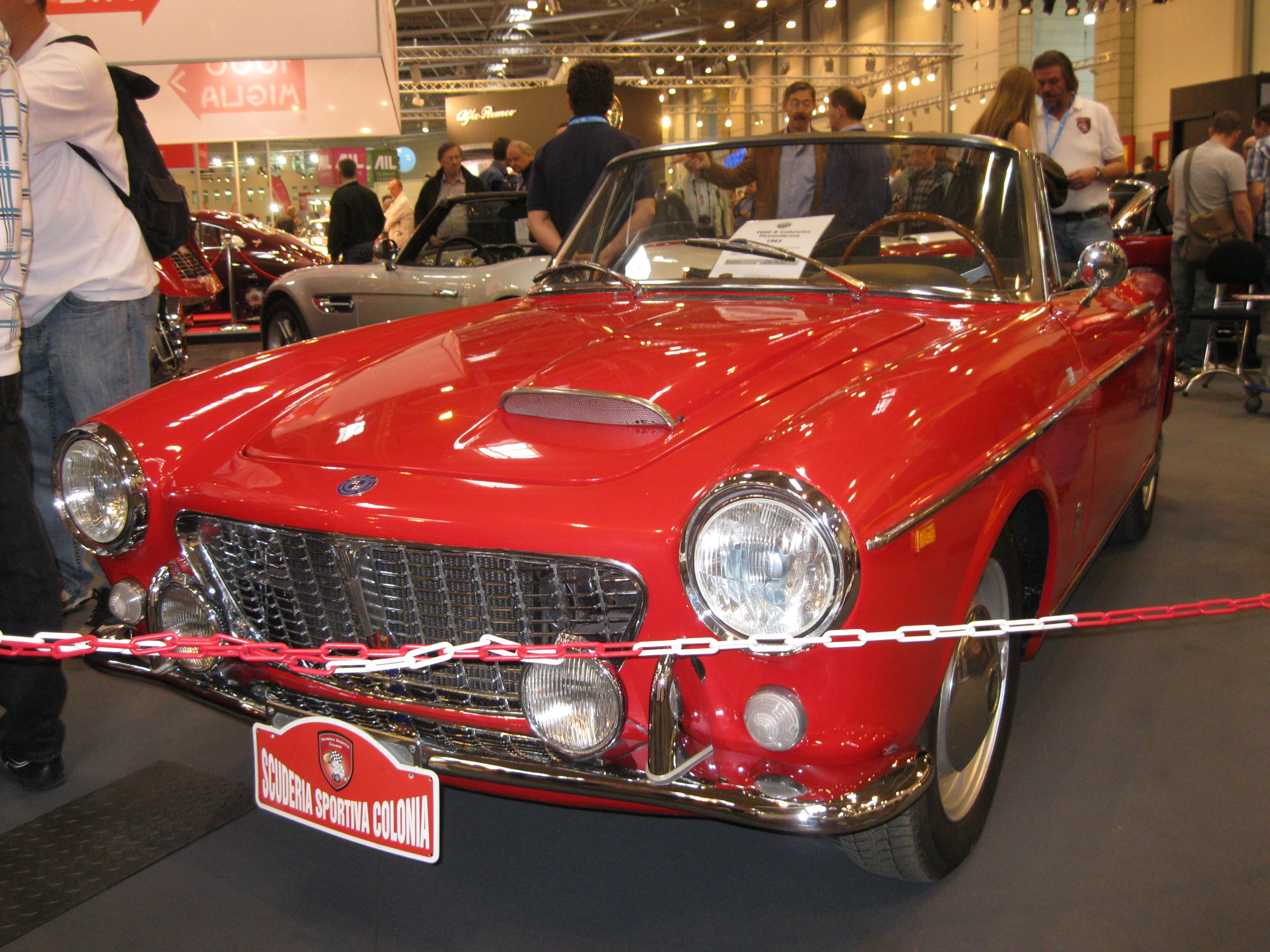
1963 Fiat 1600 S Cabriolet (tipo 118SA)

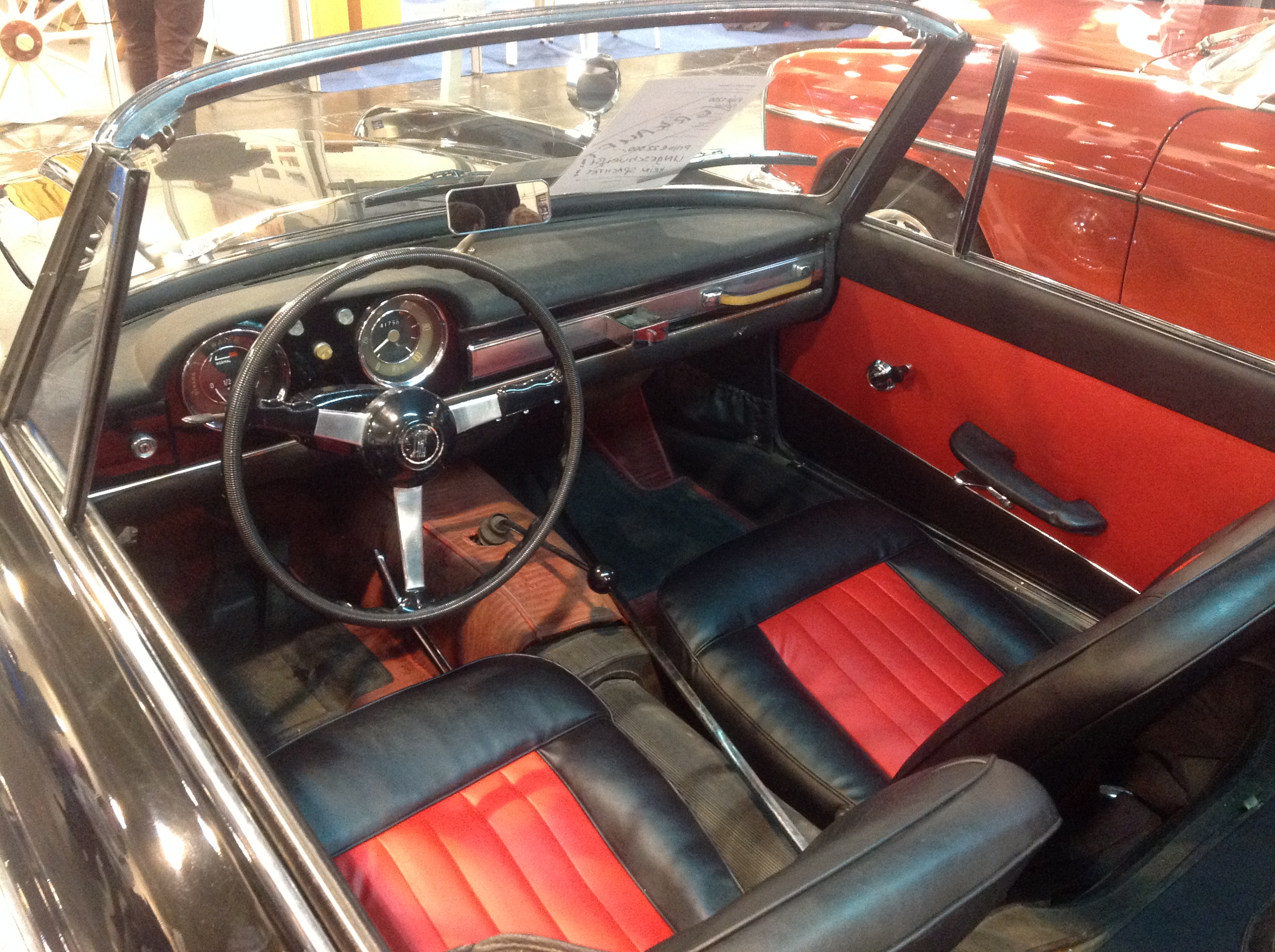
Fiat 1200 Cabriolet interior

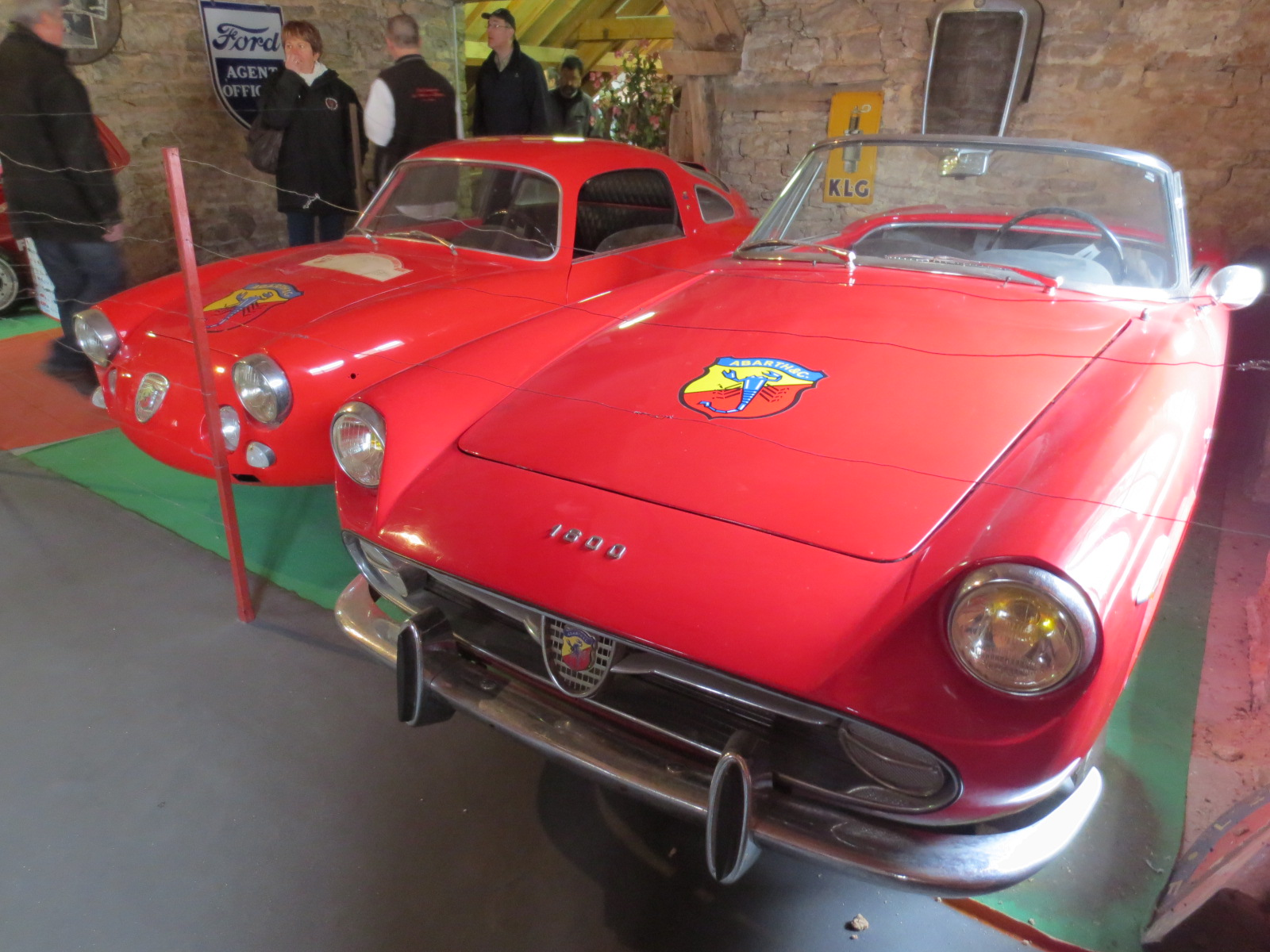
Allemano-bodied Abarth 1600 Spider

== Second generation ==
The 1200 and 1600 Coupés and Cabriolets continued to be built without major alterations until September 1963, when they received several updates. The grille, previously two segments, was now a wider, single piece, and the front bumpers lost their vertical elements. New, lower engine mounts meant a lower centre of gravity and allowed for a flatter bonnet, which had no (faux) air scoop anymore. Inside, the seats were renewed for more comfort and a better seating position. The ignition switch moved from the dashboard (left of the steering wheel) to the steering column (right of the steering wheel), in order to accommodate a steering lock. In 1961 the 1300/1500 saloon had been introduced. Therefore, the 1200 Cabriolet was now replaced by the 1500 (tipo 118H). It received the 1481 cc pushrod engine from the 1500 saloon, delivering 72 CV (53 kW) [80 SAE], and the car also benefitted from front disc brakes. It was now also available with Pininfarina's limited production coupé bodywork. The O.S.C.A. engined 1600 S, with a twin cam 1568 cc engine developing 90 CV DIN (66 kW) [100 SAE], continued to be available albeit with the same new front end treatment as that of its new 1500 sibling. It was called the Fiat 1600 S Coupé/Cabriolet (tipo 118SB) and can easily be recognized by its additional lamps at the outer corners of the grille.

In early 1965, the four-speed transmission was replaced with a five-speed unit, while the brakes received servo assistance. The 1500 became the tipo 118K, along with a slight engine upgrade; the tipo 115 C.005 engine now produced 75 CV DIN (55 kW) [83 SAE] at 5,400 rpm. This last edition can be distinguished by the round emblem with laurel wreath in the grille, as Fiat started using it from that year for its sporting models. The range was replaced by the new 124 coupés and spiders in 1966, although the 1500 Coupé continued to be sold into 1967.

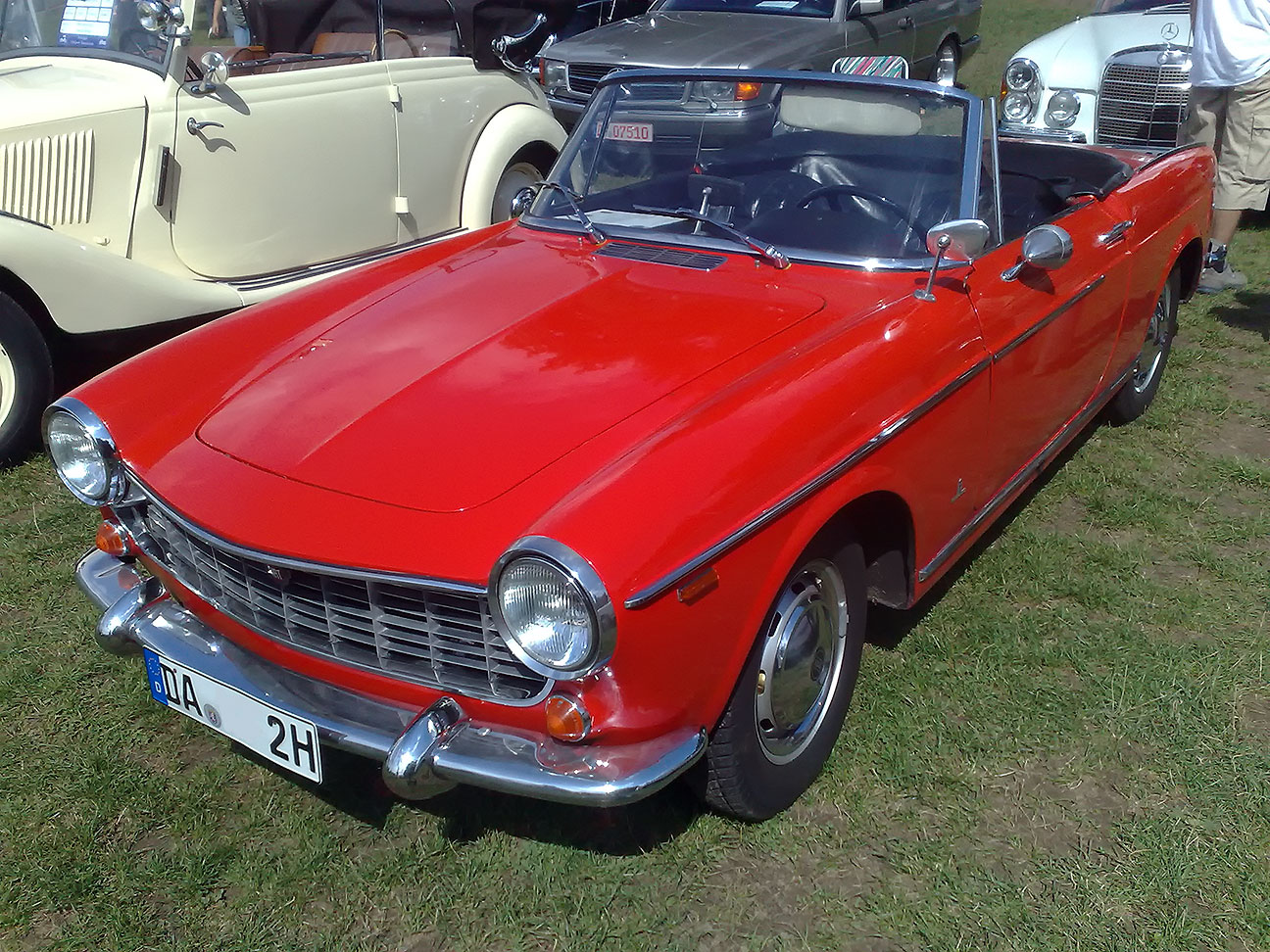
Fiat 1500 Cabriolet (tipo 118H)

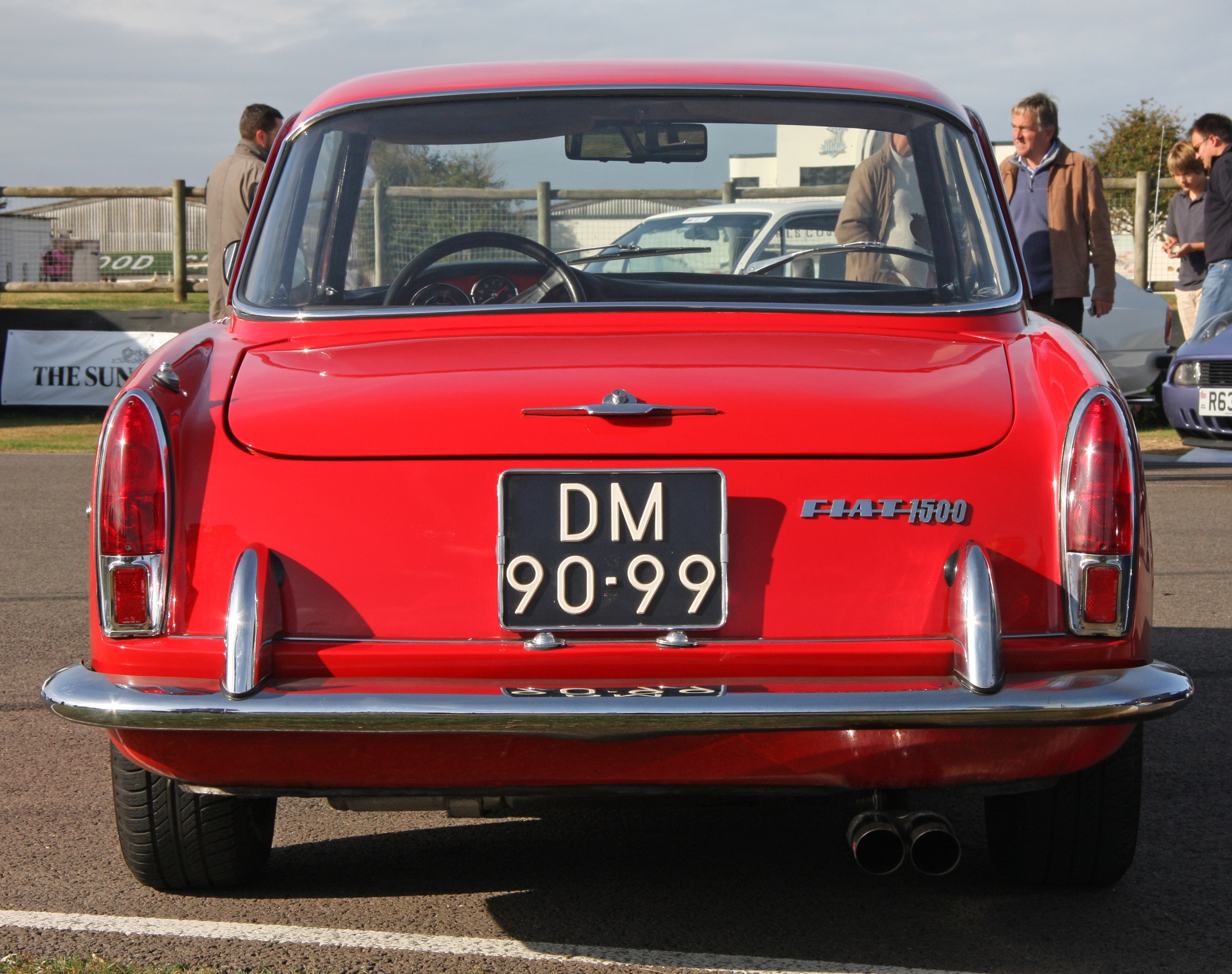
Fiat 1500 Coupé (rear)

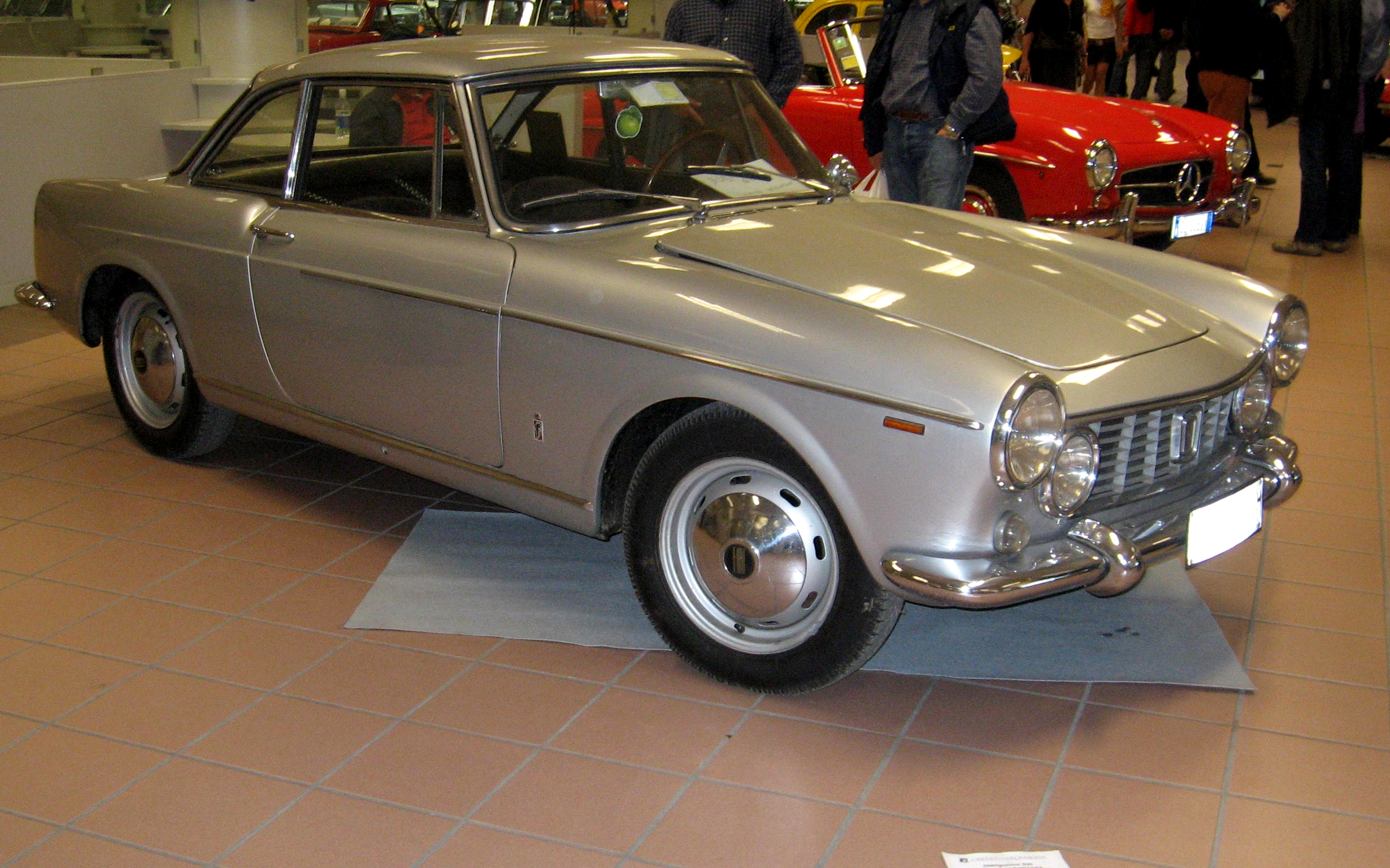
Fiat 1600 S Coupé (tipo 118SB)

== Coachbuilt variants ==
OSCA themselves built a series of sporting passenger cars using this engine in their own tube frame chassis, fitted with bodywork from a variety of independent designers (mostly Zagato). There was also a small series (sources speak of three examples) built of the OSCA Fissore 1600 S Coupé. These used the larger OSCA engine in the Fiat chassis but with special Fissore coachwork. Fissore sold an additional 18 to 25 examples of this body to Argentina, where Piero Dusio marketed them as Cisitalias.
