= Alfa Romeo Cassino Plant =

Stellantis manufacturing plant in Italy

Coordinates: 41.4850°N 13.7650°E

The Cassino Assembly Plant is a car assembly plant owned by Stellantis. It is located in the town of Piedimonte San Germano, three kilometers from Cassino, in the province of Frosinone, Italy. The car assembly plant started in 1972 with the production of Fiat 126. Today, it has a total surface area of 2 million square meters, of which 400 thousand are covered. The plant currently employs around 4,300 people.

Over seven million Fiat, Lancia and Alfa Romeo cars have rolled out over time. Models include the Fiat Tipo, Fiat Bravo/Brava, Fiat Tempra, Fiat Croma, Fiat Stilo, Lancia Delta, Alfa Romeo Giulietta, Alfa Romeo Giulia and Alfa Romeo Stelvio.

== History ==
The Cassino Assembly Plant was built in 1972 near Cassino to build the Fiat 126. The Fiat 126 was in production until 2000 and was the last Fiat to fit a rear engine. In 1974, the Fiat 131 was introduced which stayed in production until 1984.

Production of the Fiat Ritmo, a new Italian mid-size car, was kicked off six years after the plant was opened. Comau Robogate systems were installed in 1978 in the Fiat Rivalta plant and in Cassino. This highly automated system was designed to facilitate and speed up the tasks of workers in the Body Shop. The plant was now operating at full capacity. Production of a new car – the Fiat Regata – started in 1983.

Over little more than ten years, the plant had become firmly established in the area and employed many locals. New models were introduced including the Fiat Tipo in 1988. The car had a fully galvanized body and the use of new materials forced to modernize the systems. The model would be a best-seller and up to one thousand cars would roll off the lines a day.

Production of the Tempra started one year later. The model came in three versions – sedan, wagon and van, named Marengo – and shared many components with the Tipo, such as the engines, the platform, the doors and the suspension. These models were replaced from 1995 to 1996 by a new family of cars: the Bravo and Brava, the Marea and the new Marengo van.

The production lines of the Bravo, Brava, and Marea were pulled down to make way for the assembly lines of the Stilo which started production in 2001. The factory underwent yet another major technological advance when the Robogate was retired and replaced by the Open Gate system, which offered more efficient and accurate side panel welding. The production rate of the plant increased and touched 250 thousand cars a year.

== List of current cars manufactured ==
Image	Brand	Model	Production
	Alfa Romeo	Alfa Romeo Giulia (952)	2016-present
	Alfa Romeo	Alfa Romeo Stelvio	2017-present
	Maserati	Maserati Grecale	2022-present

== List of former cars manufactured ==
Image	Brand	Model	Production
	Fiat	Fiat 126	1972-1978
	Fiat	Fiat 131 Berlina/Family	1974-1978
	Fiat	Fiat Ritmo	1978-1988
	Fiat	Fiat Regata	1983-1990
	Fiat	Fiat Regata Weekend	1984-1990
	Fiat	Fiat Tipo and Uno	1988-1995
	Fiat	Fiat Tempra	1990-1996
	Fiat	Fiat Bravo/Brava	1995-2001
	Fiat	Fiat Marea	1996-2003
	Fiat	Fiat Stilo	2001-2008
	Fiat	Fiat Croma	2004-2010
	Fiat	Fiat Bravo	2007-2014
	Lancia	Lancia Delta	2008-2014
	Alfa Romeo	Alfa Romeo Giulietta	2010-2020

== An Alfa Romeo plant ==
The Cassino plant has identified with the Alfa Romeo brand since 2015. Modernisation works were started and completed in time for the first introduction phase of the Giulia in 2016.

== Correlated items ==
- Fiat
- Alfa Romeo
- Giulia
- Giulietta
