= Mariasole =

Mariasole is a common feminine Italian given name. Notable people with the name include:

- Mariasole Di Maio (born 2001), Italian actress
- Mariasole Pollio (born 2003), Italian actress, television presenter, radio personality and model

== See also ==
- Maria
- María Sol
- Maria Sole
