= Maer =

Maer may refer to:

== Places in the UK ==
- Maer, Cornwall
  - Maer Lake
- Maer, Staffordshire
  - Maer Hall, home of the pottery manufacturer Josiah Wedgwood II

== People ==
- Matthew Maer, British Army officer
- Maer Roshan (born 1967), Iranian-born American writer, editor, and entrepreneur

== Other uses ==
- Maer (office), an administrative position in medieval Wales, Scotland, and Ireland
- Maer (band), a group featuring Anna Murphy and Marjana Semkina

== See also ==
- Maera (disambiguation)
- Mare (disambiguation)
- Marea (disambiguation)
- Mayer (disambiguation)
