= Maera =

Maera can refer to:

== Mythology and religion ==
- The name Maera or Maira is used by several beings in Greek mythology:
  - Maera (hound), hound of Icarius, was turned into the dog star
  - Maera, daughter of Proetus the son of Thersander, mother of Locrus by Zeus
  - Maera, daughter of Atlas, wife of Tegeates
  - Maera, one of the Nereids, daughters of Nereus and Doris
  - Maera, one of the four daughters of the river god Erasinus, along with Anchirhoe, Byze and Melite; they are associated with Britomartis
- Maera or Mæra, an alternative name for Mara, a demon in Buddhist teachings

== Biology ==
- Maera (crustacean), a genus of amphipod crustaceans

== Places ==
- Maera (Arcadia), a town of ancient Arcadia, Greece
- Mæra, a land in the Norse saga of Egill Skallagrímsson

== See also ==
- Marea (disambiguation)
- Mera (disambiguation)
