= Marioara =

Marioara is a Romanian female given name derived from Maria:

- Marioara Popescu, a Romanian Olympics rower
- Marioara Munteanu, a Romanian female weightlifter
- Marioara Murărescu, a Romanian singer and producer of folkloric television shows
- Marioara Trașcă, a retired Romanian rower
- Marioara Trifan, an American pianist and conductor

== See also ==
- Maria (disambiguation)
- Maricica
