= Fiat FCC Adventure =

Kia concept vehicle

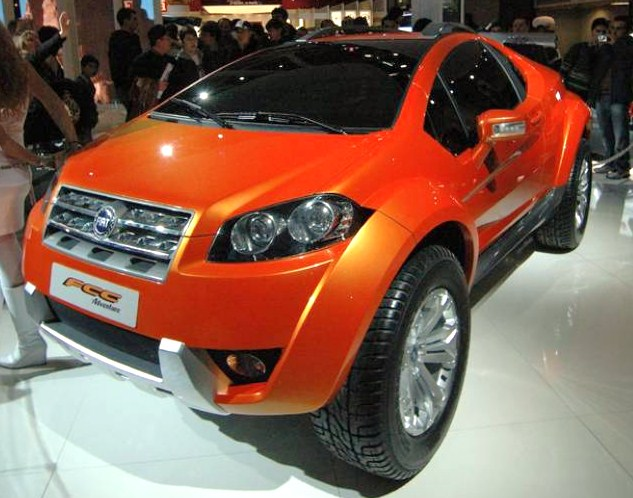
- 2006 Fiat FCC Adventure at the São Paulo Car Show (front)

Overview
- Manufacturer: Fiat Brazil
- Also called: Fiat FCC
- Production: 2006

Body and chassis
- Class: compact crossover SUV (C)
- Body style: 2-door coupe
- Layout: Front-engine, front-wheel drive (FF)
- Related: Fiat Stilo

Powertrain
- Engine: 2.45L I5 engine

The Fiat FCC Adventure is a 2-door coupe-styled compact crossover SUV concept revealed by Italian automobile manufacturer Fiat's Brazilian division Fiat Brazil at the 2006 São Paulo Car Show.

== Overview ==
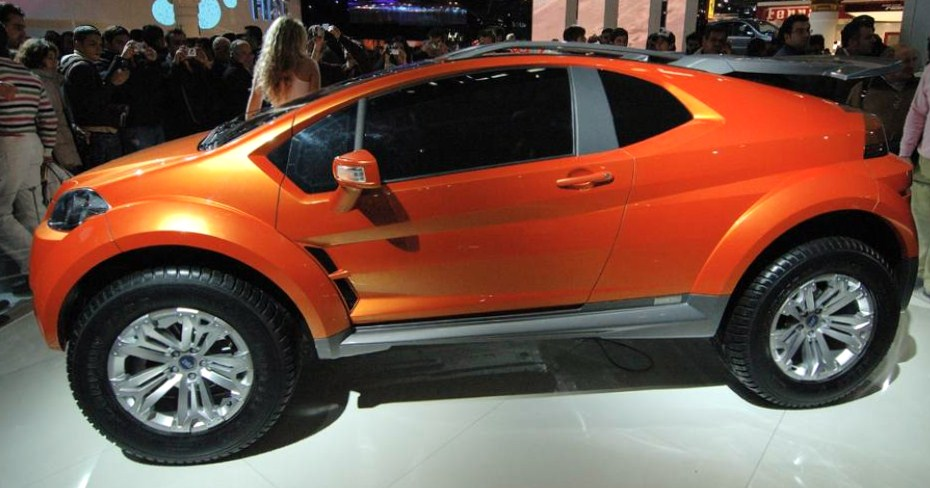
2006 Fiat FCC Adventure at the São Paulo Car Show (side)

The Fiat FCC Adventure was developed by Fiat Brazil to celebrate 30 years in the country and revealed São Paulo Car Show on October 16, 2006, aimed at being an off-road lifestyle vehicle targeted towards a younger market. It is a high-riding crossover SUV with a 2-door coupe body based on the Fiat Stilo, which is also produced in Brazil, and is the first of the Fiat FCC concept series, with the three subsequent vehicles being the 2008 FCC II Bugster, 2010 FCC III Mio, and 2014 FCC4.

== Specifications ==
The FCC Adventure concept uses Fiat's 2.4L I5 engine used in the Stilo Abarth, delivering 167 hp. Being based on the Stilo, it is front-wheel drive, despite having 18-inch Pirelli PZero 285/60 R18 tires, mudflaps, and high ground clearance like traditional off-road vehicles. The vehicle also features a large rear spoiler.

The concept is finished in a deep orange paint with aluminum wheels and accents throughout the car. This theme is also present in the interior.
