= Maria Sole =

Maria Sole is a feminine Italian name. It may refer to:

- Maria Sole Agnelli (1925–2025), businesswoman and politician
- Maria Sole Ferrieri Caputi (born 1990), association football referee
- Maria Sole Tognazzi (born 1971), film director

== See also ==
- Maria
- Mariasole
- María Sol
