= Maricica =

Maricica is a Romanian female given name:

- Maricica Puică (née Luca), a retired Romanian Olympic middle-distance runner.
- Maricica Țăran, retired Romanian-German Olympic rower

== See also ==
- Maria (disambiguation)
- Marioara
- Marcel (disambiguation)
