= Mariah =

Mariah may refer to:

- Mariah (given name), including a list of people with the name
  - Mariah Carey (born 1969), American singer-songwriter
- Mariah (microprocessor), a VAX microprocessor designed by Digital Equipment Corporation
- Another name for the fish commonly known as burbot

== See also ==
- Maria (disambiguation)
- Mariah's Storm, an American Thoroughbred racehorse
