= Fiat Tempra =

Small family car produced by the Italian automaker Fiat from 1990 to 1996

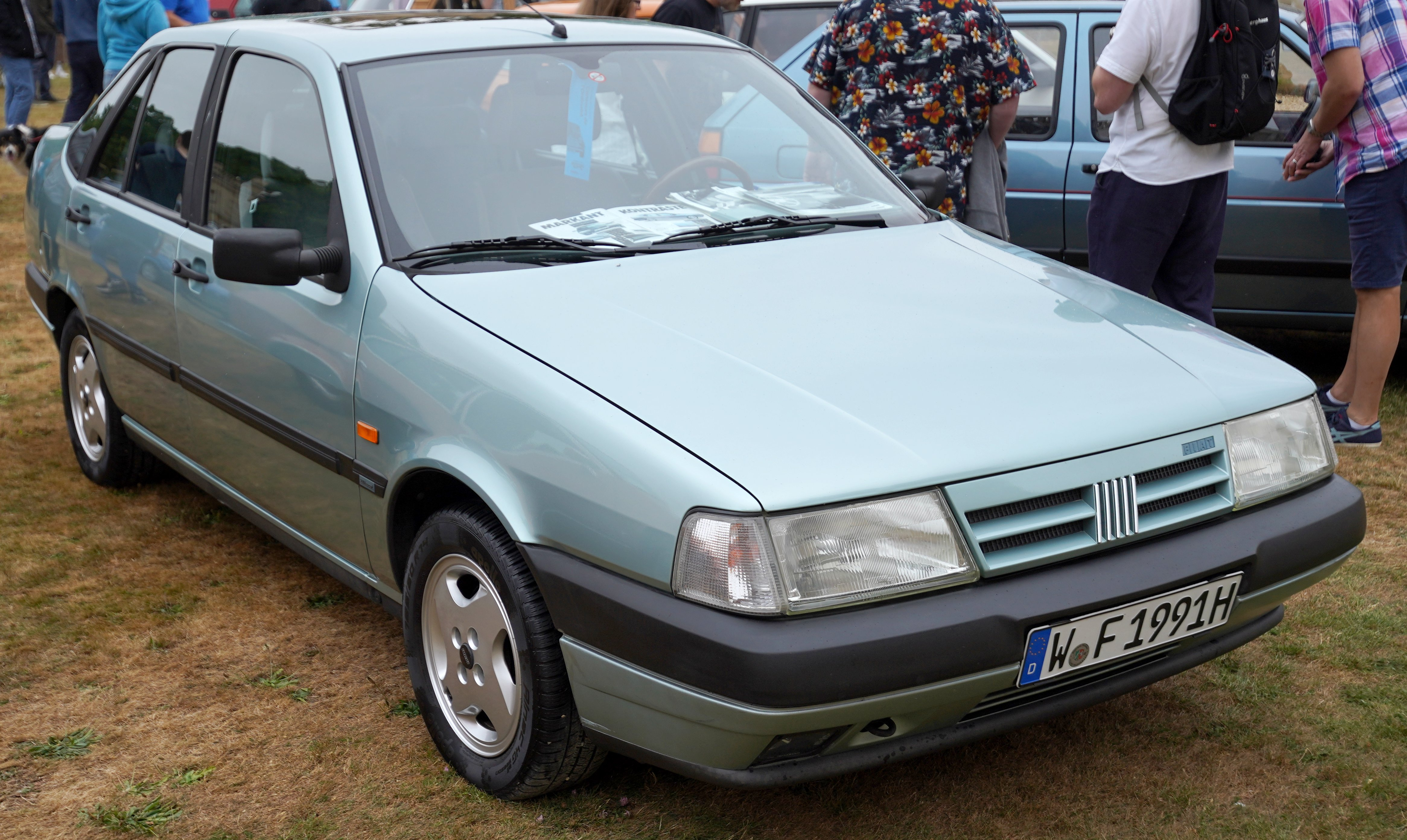

Overview
- Manufacturer: Fiat
- Also called: Fiat Marengo (panel van)
- Production: 1990–1996 (Italy); 1991–1998 (Brazil); 1990–1999 (Turkey); 1995–2002 (Vietnam)
- Assembly: Italy: Cassino Plant, Piedimonte San Germano, Lazio; Brazil: Betim; Turkey: Bursa (Tofaş); Vietnam: Ho Chi Minh City (Mekong Auto: CKD)
- Designer: Ercole Spada at I.DE.A Institute

Body and chassis
- Class: Small family car (C)
- Body style: 2-door coupé (Brazil); 4-door saloon; 5-door station wagon; 5-door panel van
- Layout: Front-engine, front-wheel drive / four-wheel drive (estate)
- Platform: Type Three (Tipo Tre)
- Related: Alfa Romeo 155; Lancia Dedra

Powertrain
- Engine: petrol: 1.4 L I4; 1.6 L I4; 1.8 L I4; 2.0 L 8V/16V I4; 2.0 L turbo I4; diesel: 1.9 L I4; 1.9 L turbo-diesel I4
- Transmission: 5-speed manual; 4-speed automatic; Selecta CVT

Dimensions
- Wheelbase: 2,540 mm (100 in)
- Length: Saloon: 4,355 mm (171.5 in); Station Wagon: 4,472 mm (176.1 in)
- Width: 1,695 mm (66.7 in)
- Height: 1,445 mm (56.9 in)
- Curb weight: 1,030 kg (2,271 lb)-1,220 kg (2,690 lb)

Chronology
- Predecessor: Fiat Regata
- Successor: Fiat Marea

The Fiat Tempra (Type 159) is a medium family car manufactured in Italy by Fiat from 1990 to 1996, replacing the Fiat Regata. The original project was called Tipo 3, being a mid-size car between the Fiat Tipo (project Tipo 2) and the bigger Fiat Croma (project Tipo 4). The Tempra shared its Type Three platform with the Lancia Dedra and Alfa Romeo 155.

The Tempra was named the 1991 Semperit Irish Car of the Year in Ireland. In Brazil, the Tempra was manufactured from 1991 to 1998. The car was also assembled in Turkey by Tofaş and in Vietnam by Mekong Auto in complete knock down until 2000.

== Overview ==
The saloon of the Tempra was shown for the first time in newspapers in November 1989, and introduced in March 1990 at the Geneva Motor Show, with the station wagon (marketed as the "Tempra SW") arriving two months later in Turin. The initial engine range comprised 1.4, 1.6 and 1.8 petrol units and normally aspirated and turbocharged 1.9 litre diesel units.

The car began to be produced in Brazil for Latin American markets, after being introduced in Aruba, September 1991. First seen in September 1992, a two door coupé version of it, was produced exclusively for the market in Brazil. It was built until 1995, and a turbocharged petrol version was also available there.

== Mechanics ==
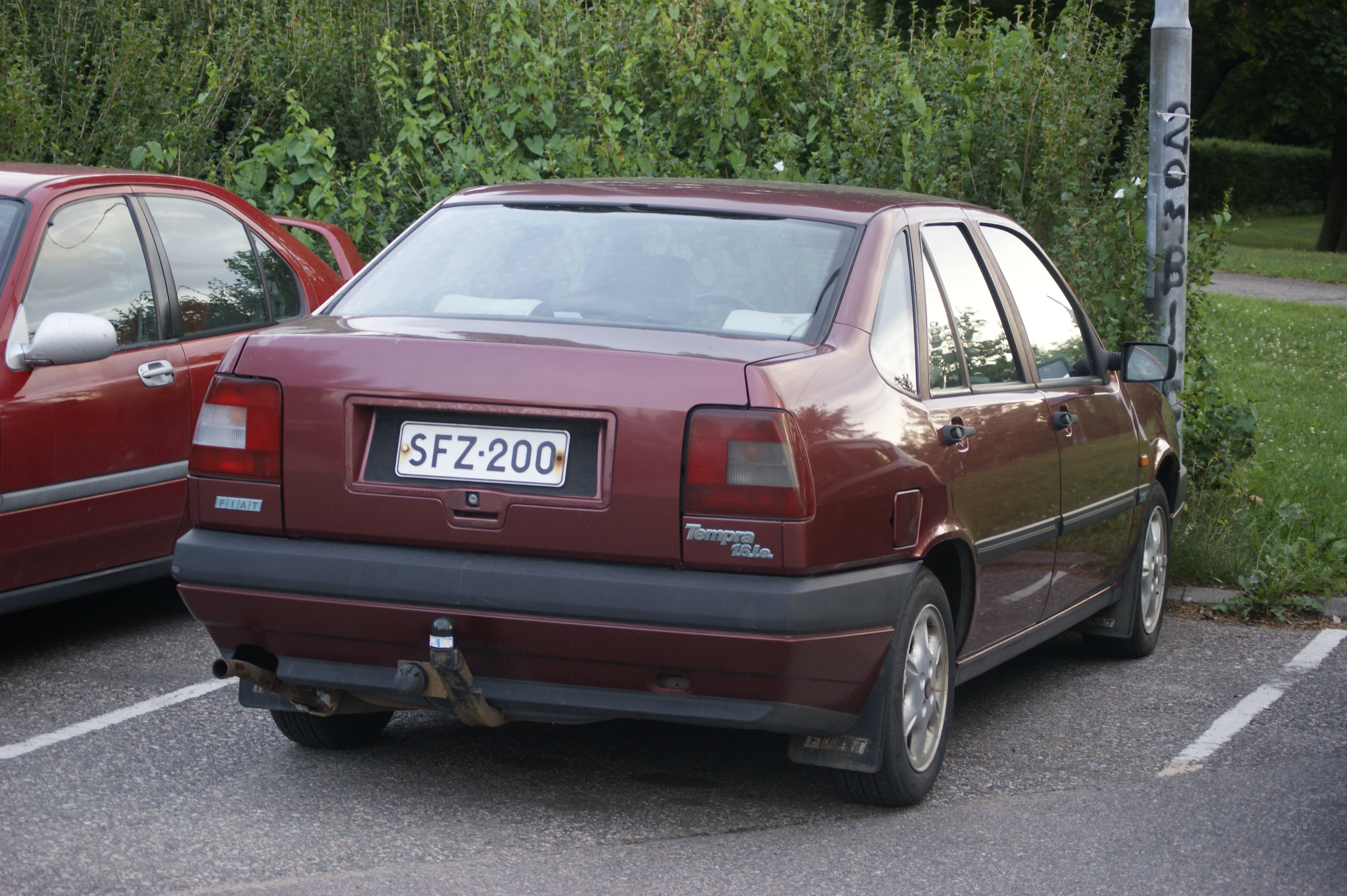
Fiat Tempra (rear view)

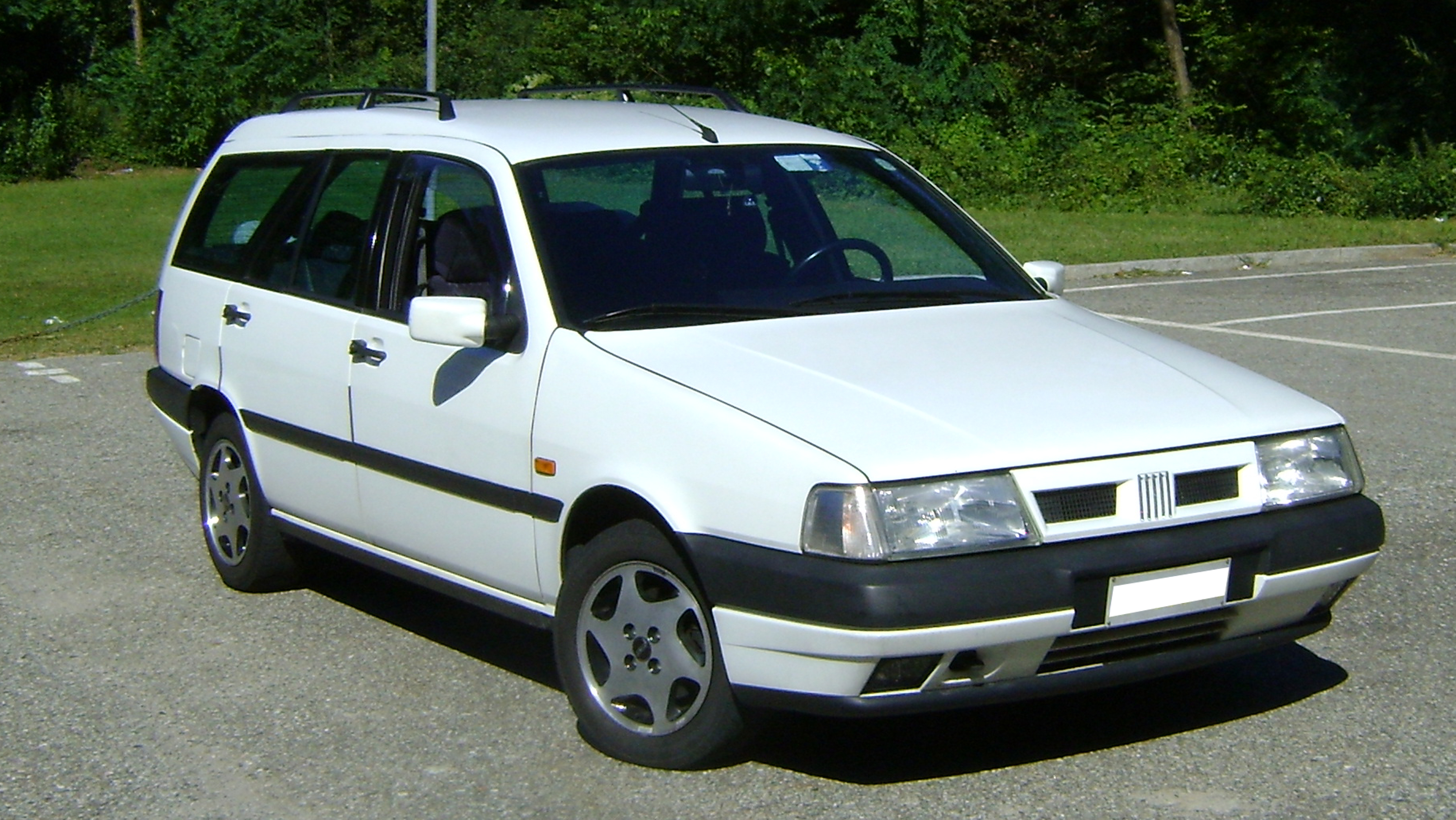
Fiat Tempra Station Wagon

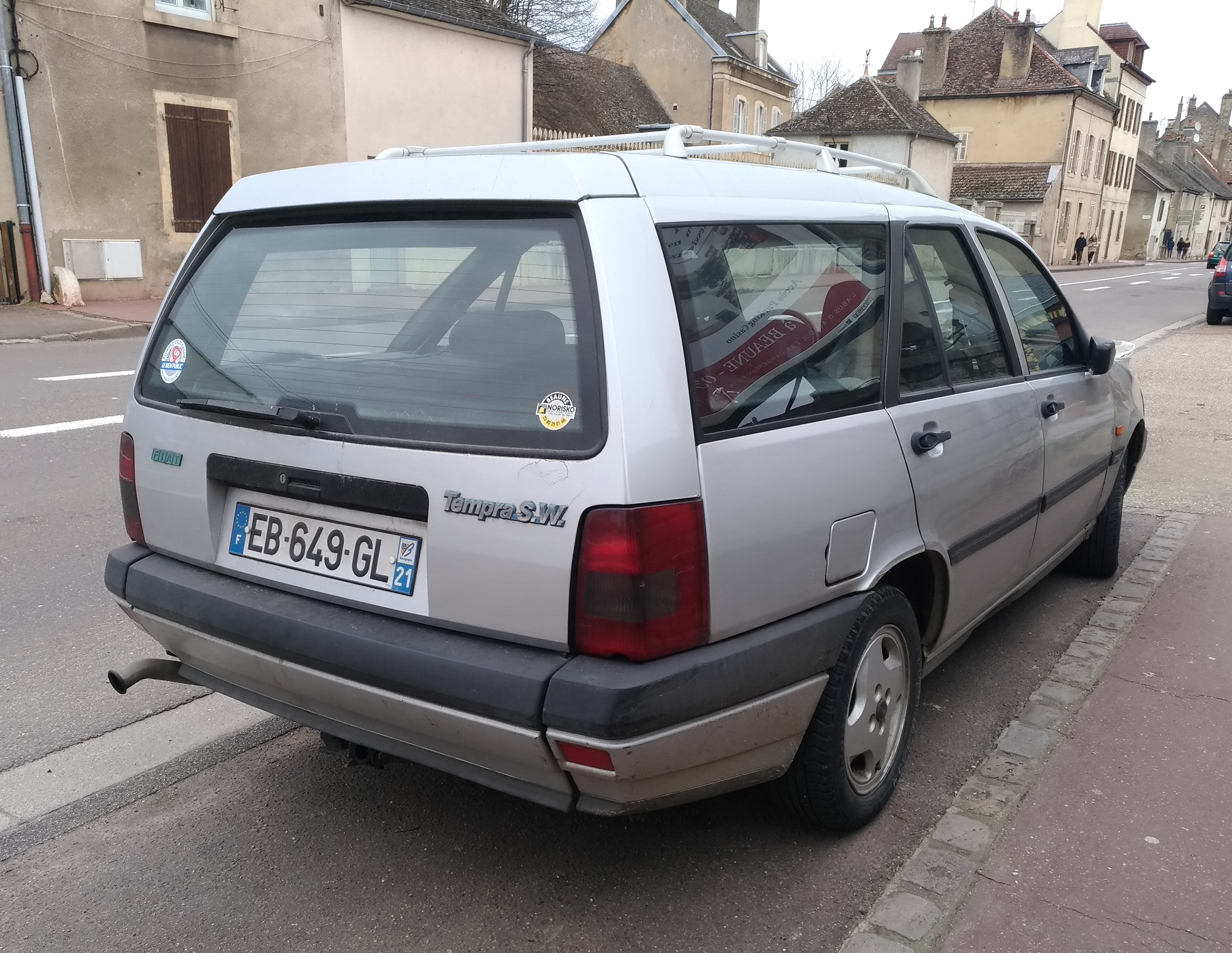
Fiat Tempra Station Wagon (rear)

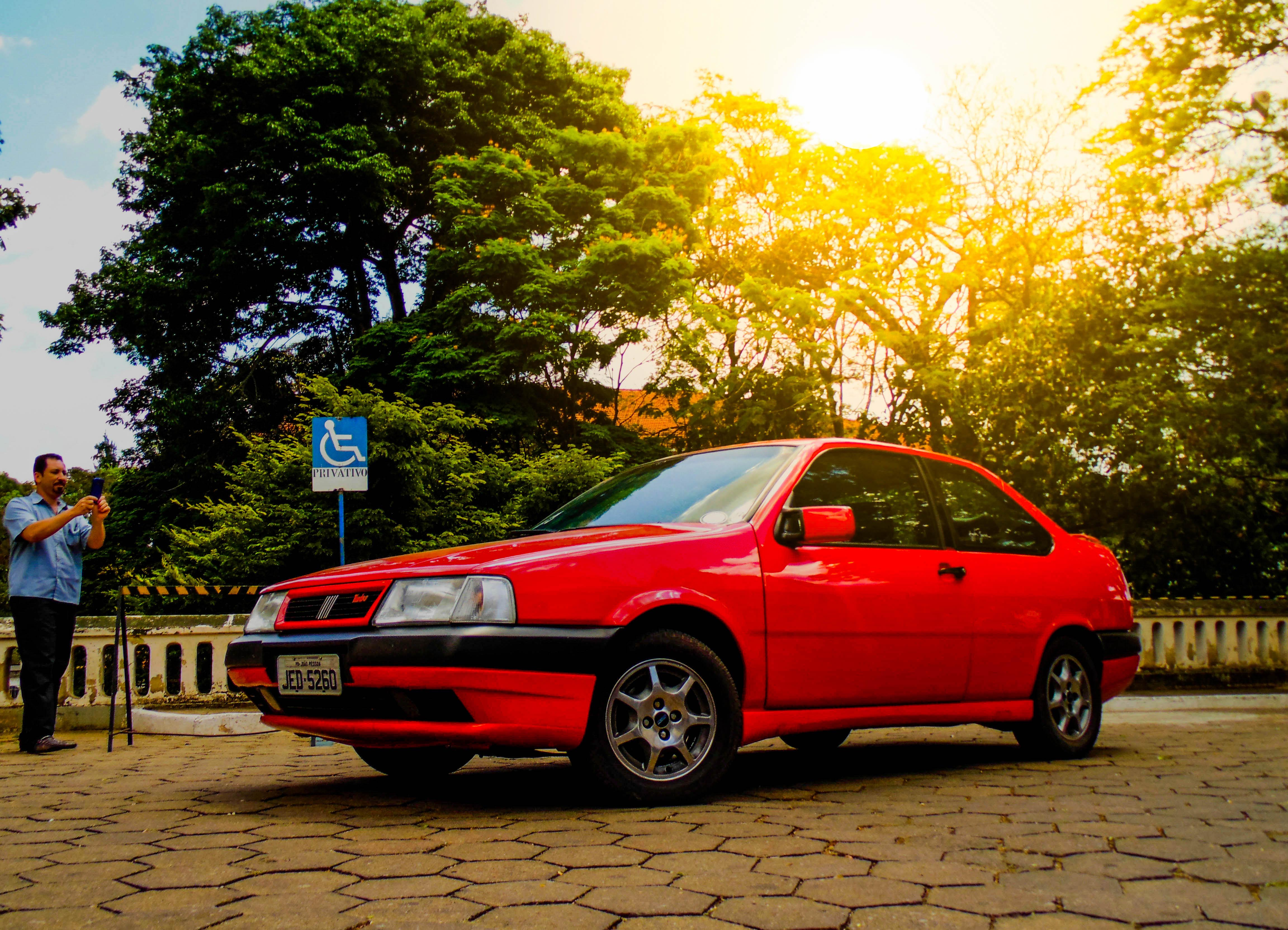
Fiat Tempra Turbo (Brazilian market)

The Tempra's engine range was similar to that of the Tipo. Initially 1.4 and 1.6 litre models had carburetted engines. Both of these models were discontinued after 1992, due to the new European emission standards, and thus all models from 1993 onwards had catalytic converters and electronic fuel injection.

The standard transmission was a five-speed manual, and a continuously variable transmission was also offered as an option, a first on a midsize saloon. The CVT transmission was previously available on the Uno, Panda, Ritmo and Tipo.

The CVT transmission, called the "Selecta", was available only with the 1.6-litre engine with either bodystyle. As of July 1991, the 2.0 litre SX model became available with an optional four speed automatic transmission.

At the March 1992 Geneva Motor Show, a version with permanent four-wheel drive was introduced. It was only available in the Station Wagon bodystyle, fitted with the two-litre engine. The four-wheel drive system has a slight front bias (56/44%).

During its six year production run, few changes were made apart from a minor facelift in April 1993, which resulted in a new front grille and other minor styling changes, as well as new equipment levels.

Main parts (most notably, the doors) were shared with the Fiat Tipo. Other vehicles, derived from the same platform were the Lancia Dedra (Tempra's most similar cousin, sharing all mechanical components) and the Alfa Romeo 155.

The Tempra had two exclusive options in Brazil: a two-door coupé bodystyle for any engine option (from 1992 to 1994), and a 2.0-litre turbo, which was sold in the two-door bodystyle called "Tempra Turbo" (1994 to 1995) and with the four-door as "Tempra Turbo Stile" (1996 to 1997).

The engine delivered 165 PS (121 kW; 163 hp) and 26.5 kgf⋅m (192 lb⋅ft; 260 N⋅m) of torque.

Period magazine tests registered 0–100 km/h (62 mph) in 8.2 seconds, and a top speed of 213 km/h (132 mph) for the two-door Tempra Turbo in 1994. The Tempra Turbo 1994 was only the second turbocharged car to enter series production in Brazil. The first one was the Uno Turbo, also in 1994.

== Equipment and trim levels ==
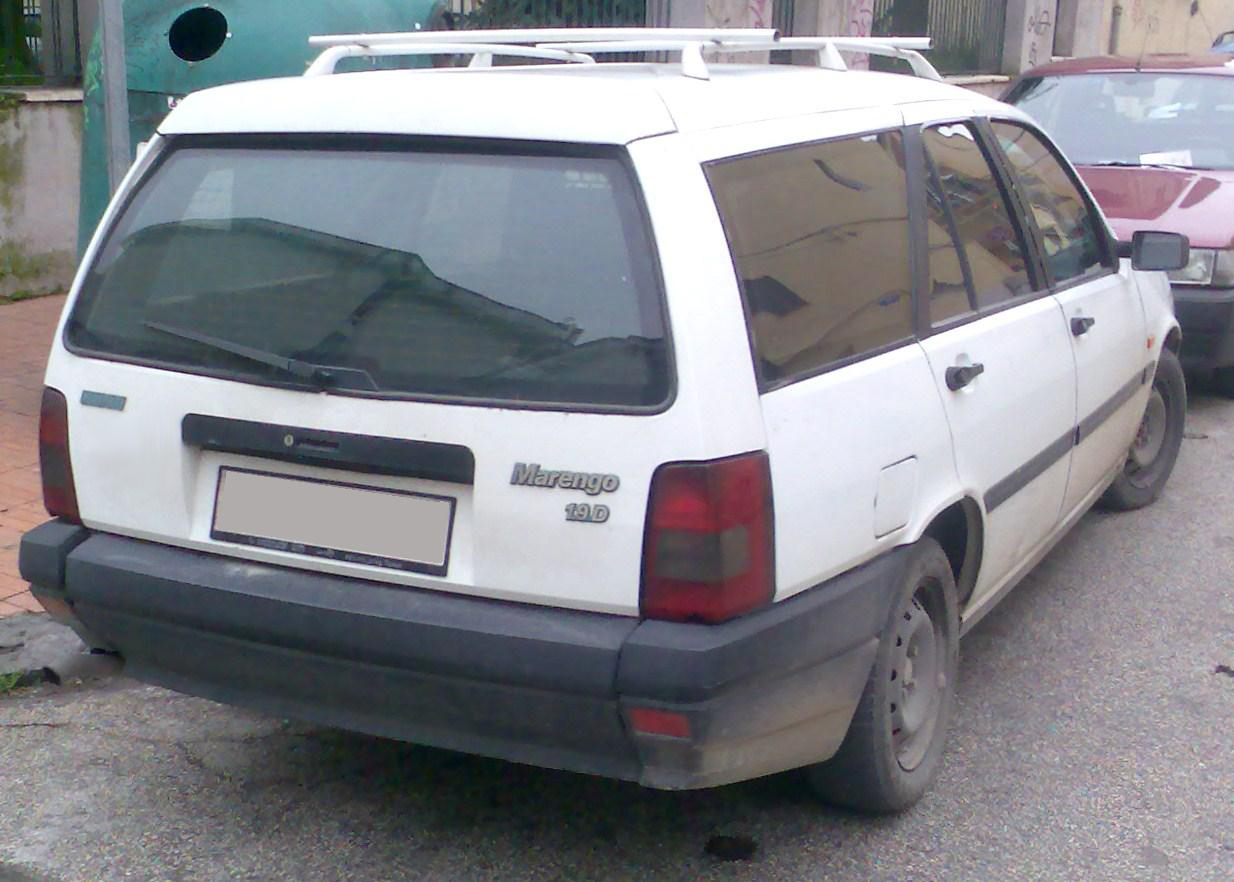
Fiat Marengo Van

Only two trim levels were available in the early years of production: standard (S) and SX, both reasonably equipped considering the Tempra's low price.

SX models for example, featured power windows, power locks, adjustable seat belts and steering wheel, front fog lights, body coloured bumpers, velvet upholstery, a futuristic digital dashboard and many other standard extras. They were also available with optional extras like anti-lock brakes, alloy wheels, sunroof, electronic climate control and a rear window wiper on the saloon (standard on the estate).

A facelift in April 1993 featured more trim levels, now ranging from the standard models ("L" in the United Kingdom, where it was only available with 1.4-litre engine) via the S and SX to the top SLX, which was only available with 1.8, and 2.0 litre engines in the United Kingdom. Also extra safety features were added, like various reinforcements of the body, side protection bars in the doors, and a driver's airbag (optional or standard, depending on the market).

The four-wheel drive Station Wagons continued to be available in some markets, such as Switzerland.

In Turkey, where Tofaş built the car, there were also "SX A" and "SX AK" (climate control added) trims available. The 1,000,000th car which Tofaş built was a Tempra 2.0 i.e. 16V model. The Turkish 16 valve Tempra was not sold in the rest of Europe; it was also available with station wagon bodystyle and has a 148 PS (109 kW) engine.

There was also a panel van bodystyle sold in the domestic market of Italy called the Marengo, a name also used before with the 131 Estate, Regata Weekend, and later again with the Marea Wagon. This is a commercial version of the Tempra which was based on the Station Wagon bodystyle, but with basic equipment, heavily tinted rear windows, and no rear seats. The engines were most commonly the naturally aspirated diesel units.

== Known issues ==
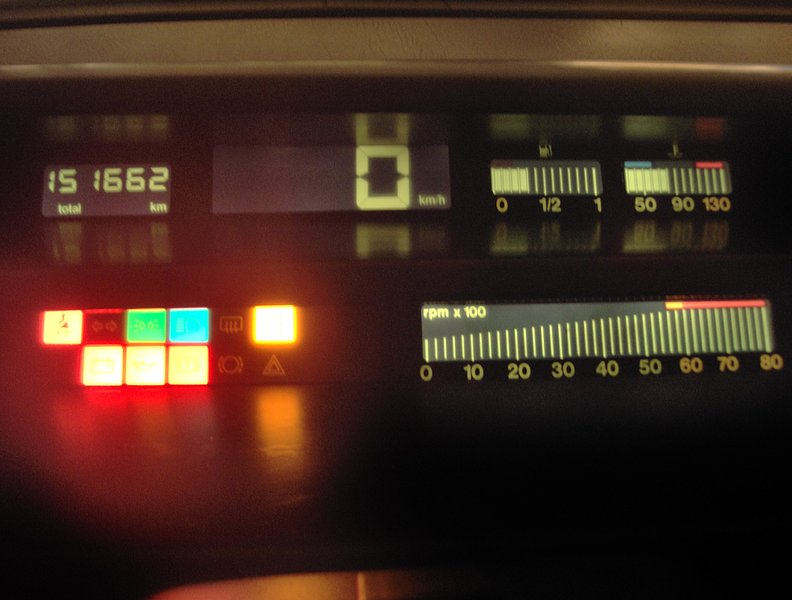
Digital dashboard on SX models

Quattroruote, a popular Italian motoring magazine, reported some failures and defects with the Tempra. The first issue to be reported was some water ingress through the windscreen seals, an issue that previously plagued some other Fiat vehicles, especially Alfa 33, which in rainy conditions would carry a significant quantity of water on board. This problem was reported from 1990–1992 and was resolved with using a higher quantity of sealant when fitting the glass.

Another reported problem was high oil consumption, especially the 1,581 cc engine, which was a common defect with the Tipo (with the same engine) and Panda (1000 FIRE engine). The same was reported for other Fiat vehicles but disappeared with the new 1.6 L engine.

On the same model, from 1994, the car started to show some electronic malfunctions, with items such as the electronic control unit, code key and electric system. A design flaw of the Tempra was that its rear window was too small and inclined and the tail too tall, so that rear visibility was poor. This issue was common with the 155 and Dedra, and was one of the reasons the estate had more success than the saloon, especially in the United Kingdom.

== Qualities ==
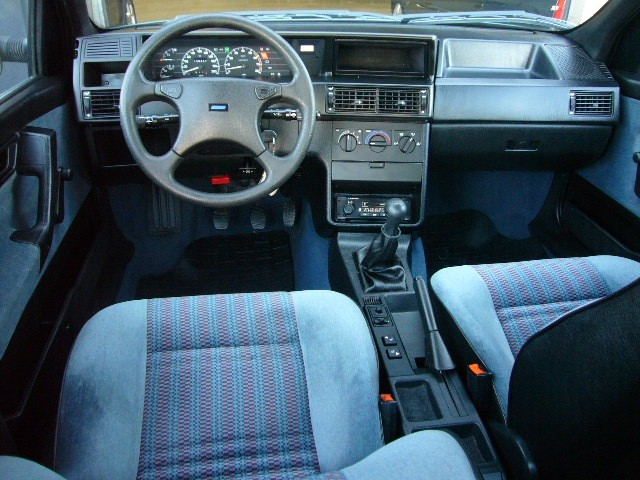
Tempra Interior and standard dashboard on S models

Average range for a 55 kW 1.6 litre sedan was around 920 km (572 mi) (14 km/L or 7.1 L/100 km or 39.5 mpg_{‑imp}), and consumption at constant speed was of 16.5 km/L (6.1 L/100 km; 46.6 mpg_{‑imp}) at 90 km/h (56 mph) and 11.6 km/L (8.6 L/100 km; 32.8 mpg_{‑imp}) at 130 km/h (81 mph). All these were aided by a favourable aerodynamic (C_{x} 0.297) and only 17.2 PS subtracted at 100 km/h (62 mph), which was the best result among all the rivals. The Tempra also had comparably large fuel tanks; 65 litres (17 US gal; 14 imp gal) for the sedan and 70 L (18 US gal; 15 imp gal) for the Station Wagon.

Another advantage was the galvanized structure, which allowed the car to be resistant against rust over time, showing good resilience to weather and bad climate conditions after many years. Other qualities were the strength and reliability of the mechanics, thanks to the engine that could be used in urban, extra urban and highway driving conditions.

The luggage capacity, especially in the Marengo panel van, was also one of the favourites among corporations, especially with the 1,929 cc diesel engine, and the interior space was comfortable for five persons during long travels.

== F1 safety car ==
External image
- Fiat Tempra at the Brazilian Grand Prix in 1993

A Brazilian produced version of the 16 valve Tempra was used in Formula One as the safety car during the 1993 season, most notably at the Brazilian Grand Prix.

== End of production ==
The Tempra was discontinued in Europe in August 1996, and in Brazil in 1998. It was replaced by the Marea, which is based on the Bravo and Brava platform, the replacements for the Tempra's sister car the Tipo. In Brazil, 204,795 Tempras were produced in eight years, and in Turkey, where the car was manufactured by Tofaş from November 1990 until 1999, 129,590 were made.

== Engines ==
Model	Engine layout	Engine code	Displacement	Power	Torque	Notes
1.4 S	I4 SOHC	159A2.000	1,372 cc	DIN: 57 kW (77 PS) at 6,000 rpm ECE: 56 kW (76 PS) at 6,000 rpm	DIN: 108 N⋅m (80 lb⋅ft) at 2,900 rpm ECE: 106 N⋅m (78 lb⋅ft) at 2,900 rpm	carburetor
1.4 i.e.	I4 SOHC	160A1.046	1,372 cc	DIN: 52 kW (71 PS) at 6,000 rpm ECE: 51 kW (69 PS) at 6,000 rpm	DIN: 108 N⋅m (80 lb⋅ft) at 2,900 rpm ECE: 106 N⋅m (78 lb⋅ft) at 3,000 rpm	cat and fuel injection
1.6 S	I4 SOHC	159A3.000	1,581 cc	DIN: 63 kW (86 PS) at 5,800 rpm ECE: 62 kW (84 PS) at 5,800 rpm	DIN: 132 N⋅m (97 lb⋅ft) at 2,900 rpm ECE: 130 N⋅m (96 lb⋅ft) at 2,900 rpm	carburetor
1.6 i.e.	I4 SOHC	159A3.000	1,581 cc	DIN: 59 kW (80 PS) at 6,000 rpm ECE: 57 kW (77 PS) at 6,000 rpm	DIN: 128 N⋅m (94 lb⋅ft) at 3,000 rpm ECE: 124 N⋅m (91 lb⋅ft) at 3,000 rpm	cat and fuel injection (until 1992)
1.6 i.e.	I4 SOHC	835C1.000; 159A3.048 (Selecta)	1,581 cc	DIN: 56 kW (76 PS) at 6,000 rpm ECE: 55 kW (75 PS) at 6,000 rpm	DIN: 128 N⋅m (94 lb⋅ft) at 3,000 rpm ECE: 125 N⋅m (92 lb⋅ft) at 3,000 rpm	cat and fuel injection (after 1992)
1.6 i.e.	I4 SOHC		1,581 cc	DIN: 68 kW (93 PS) at 5,750 rpm	DIN: 136 N⋅m (100 lb⋅ft) at 2,750 rpm	No catalyzer (Turkey and other markets)
1.8 i.e.	I4 DOHC	159A4.000	1,756 cc	DIN: 81 kW (110 PS) at 6,000 rpm ECE: 80 kW (109 PS) at 6,000 rpm	DIN: 142 N⋅m (105 lb⋅ft) at 2,500 rpm ECE: 140 N⋅m (100 lb⋅ft) at 2,500 rpm	fuel injection
1.8 i.e.	I4 DOHC	835C2.000	1,756 cc	DIN: 77 kW (105 PS) at 6,000 rpm ECE: 76 kW (103 PS) at 6,000 rpm	DIN: 140 N⋅m (103 lb⋅ft) at 3,000 rpm ECE: 137 N⋅m (101 lb⋅ft) at 3,000 rpm	cat and fuel injection, 1992– 66 kW (90 PS) DIN in some markets
2.0	I4 8V DOHC		1,995 cc	DIN: 71 kW (97 PS) at 5,250 rpm	DIN: 159 N⋅m (117 lb⋅ft) at 3,000 rpm	carburetted Brazilian model
2.0 i.e.	I4 8V DOHC	159A6.046	1,995 cc	DIN: 85 kW (115 PS) at 5,750 rpm ECE: 83 kW (113 PS) at 5,750 rpm	DIN: 159 N⋅m (117 lb⋅ft) at 3,300 rpm ECE: 156 N⋅m (115 lb⋅ft) at 3,300 rpm	cat and fuel injection
2.0 i.e. 16V	I4 16V DOHC		1,995 cc	DIN: 92 kW (125 PS) at 5,750 rpm DIN: 109 kW (148 PS) at 6,250 rpm	DIN: 177 N⋅m (131 lb⋅ft) at 4,750 rpm DIN: 186 N⋅m (137 lb⋅ft) at 5,000 rpm	Brazilian model Turkish model
2.0 i.e. Turbo	I4 8V DOHC		1,995 cc	DIN: 121 kW (165 PS) at 5,250 rpm	DIN: 260 N⋅m (192 lb⋅ft) at 3,000 rpm	(1993–1996 two door, and 1995–1998 four door Tempra Turbo Stile); Brazilian model
1.9 D	I4 SOHC	160A7.000	1,929 cc	DIN: 48 kW (65 PS) at 4,600 rpm	119 N⋅m (88 lb⋅ft) at 2,000 rpm	
1.9 TD	I4 SOHC	160A6.000	1,929 cc	DIN: 60 kW (82 PS) at 4,000 rpm ECE: 59 kW (80 PS) at 4,000 rpm	DIN: 173 N⋅m (128 lb⋅ft) at 2,800 rpm	with EGR
1.9 TD	I4 SOHC	160A6.000	1,929 cc	DIN: 68 kW (92 PS) at 4,100 rpm ECE: 66 kW (90 PS) at 4,100 rpm	DIN: 191 N⋅m (141 lb⋅ft) at 2,400 rpm ECE: 186 N⋅m (137 lb⋅ft) at 2,400 rpm	
