= Black Maria =

Black Maria may refer to:

== Art and literature ==
- Black Mariah, a character in the Luke Cage comics series
- Black Maria, a character in the manga series One Piece
- Black Maria, a 1991 novel by Diana Wynne Jones
- Black Maria, a 1960 anthology of drawings by Charles Addams
- Black Maria, a book of poetry by Kevin Young
- The Black Maria, a 2016 book of poetry by Aracelis Girmay

== Music ==
- The Black Maria, a Canadian rock band
- "Black Maria", a song by Todd Rundgren from the 1972 album Something/Anything?
- "Big Black Mariah", a song by Tom Waits from the 1985 album Rain Dogs
- "The Black Maria", a song by The Decemberists from the 2024 Album As It Ever Was, So It Will Be Again

== Transportation ==
- Black Maria (horse), an American racehorse
- Black Maria (IFF), a fighter aircraft IFF (identification friend or foe) interrogator
- ALCO DL-202-2 and DL-203-2, experimental diesel-electric locomotives known informally as the Black Maria
- Black Maria, the airplane flown by Canadian World War I ace Raymond Collishaw
- "Black Maria", the first parking meter
- Black Maria, an informal nickname for a police van

== Card games ==
- Black Maria (card game)
- Black Lady, a card game also sometimes known as Black Maria

== Other ==
- Black Madonna, depictions of the Blessed Virgin Mary with dark skin
- Edison's Black Maria, a film studio created by Thomas Edison
- Maria Chernaya, a cavalry commander in the Revolutionary Insurgent Army of Ukraine

== See also ==
- Maria (disambiguation)
- Black (disambiguation)
