= María Sol =

María Sol is a feminine Spanish name. It may refer to:

- María Sol Branz
- María Sol Corral
- Maria Sol Muñoz
- Sol Lombardo

== See also ==
- María
- Maria Sole
- Sol María
