= Fiat Marengo =

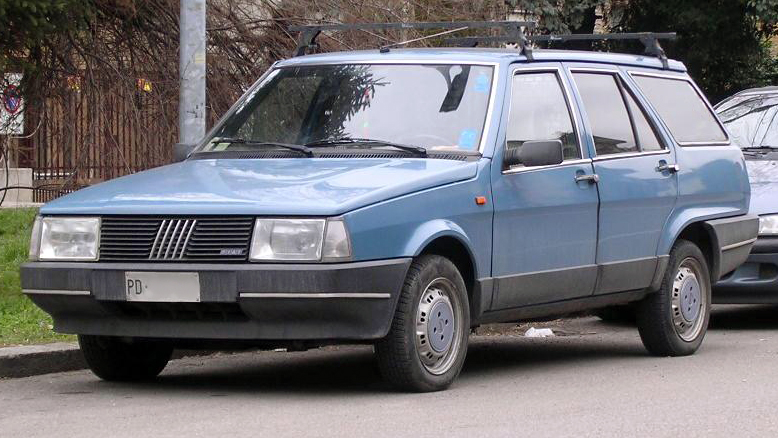
- Second generation (Regata)

Overview
- Production: 1979–2001

Body and chassis
- Class: Van

Chronology
- Successor: Fiat Stilo Multiwagon (as a passenger vehicle); Fiat Doblo (as a commercial vehicle)

Marengo is a model name that Italian car maker Fiat has given to the van derivatives of its mid size cars, beginning with the "Fiat 131 Marengo" in 1979 and continuing with the Regata, Tempra, and Marea. The Marengo light commercial vehicle derivatives only have two seats, and have only been equipped with diesel engines.

The nameplate was retired in 2001, and succeeded by the van version of the Fiat Stilo Multiwagon. Fiat has a tradition of naming their commercial vehicle derivatives differently from the cars upon which they are based, compare with the Fiorino and the Penny.

== First generation ==
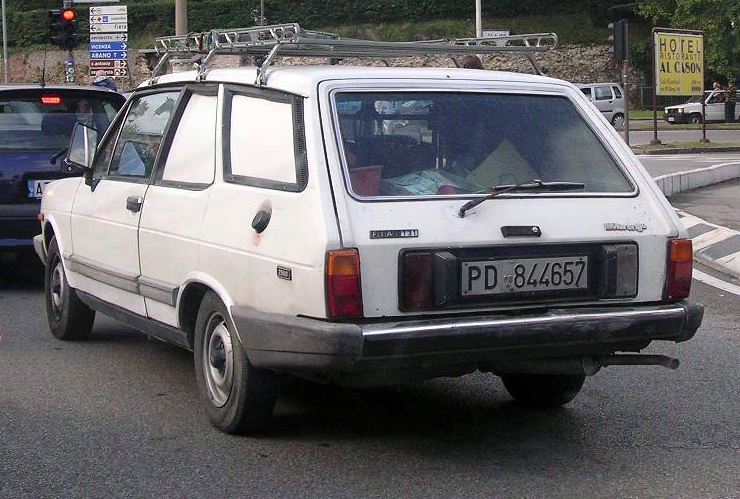
First generation 131 Marengo, 3rd series

The first version was introduced in 1979, and was a three door panel van version of the Fiat 131 in its 2nd and 3rd series. Unlike the succeeding models it had unique bodywork, as no other three door estate version of the 131 was marketed. It was actually sold as the "131 Marengo".

== Second generation ==
The second generation was presented alongside the new Fiat Regata Weekend upon which it was based. As with its successors, the side windows in the rear were blacked out. Unlike the Regata, with its four engine options, the Marengo was only available with a 65 PS (48 kW), 1,929 cc diesel engine. A strict two seater it has a cargo capacity of 430 kg (948 lb).

== Third generation ==
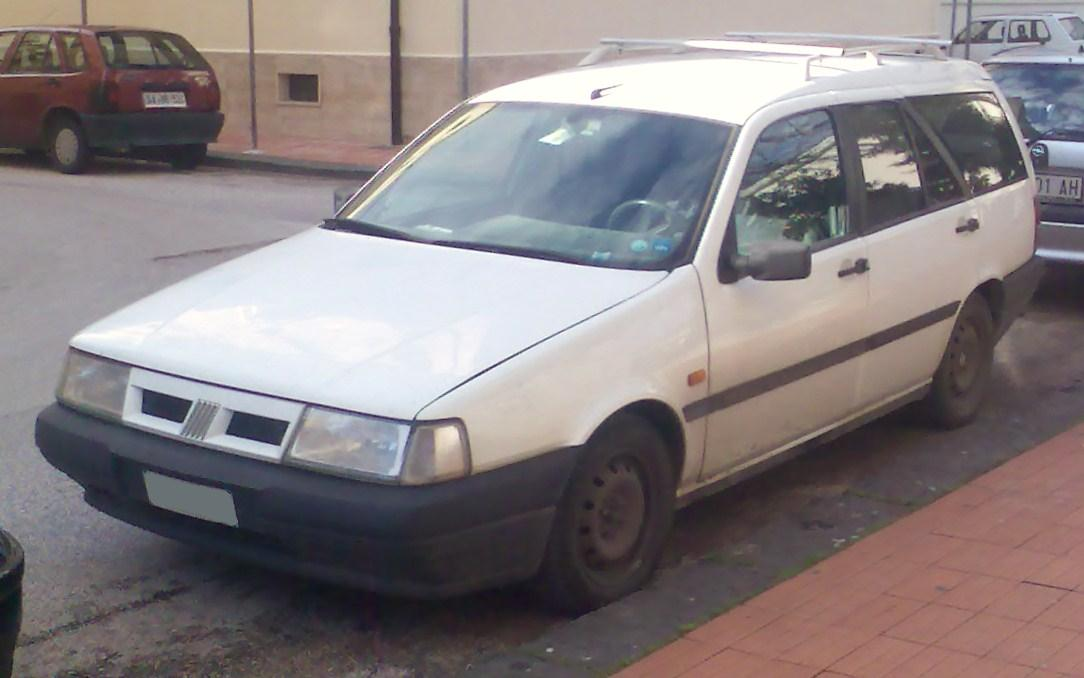
Third generation (Tempra)

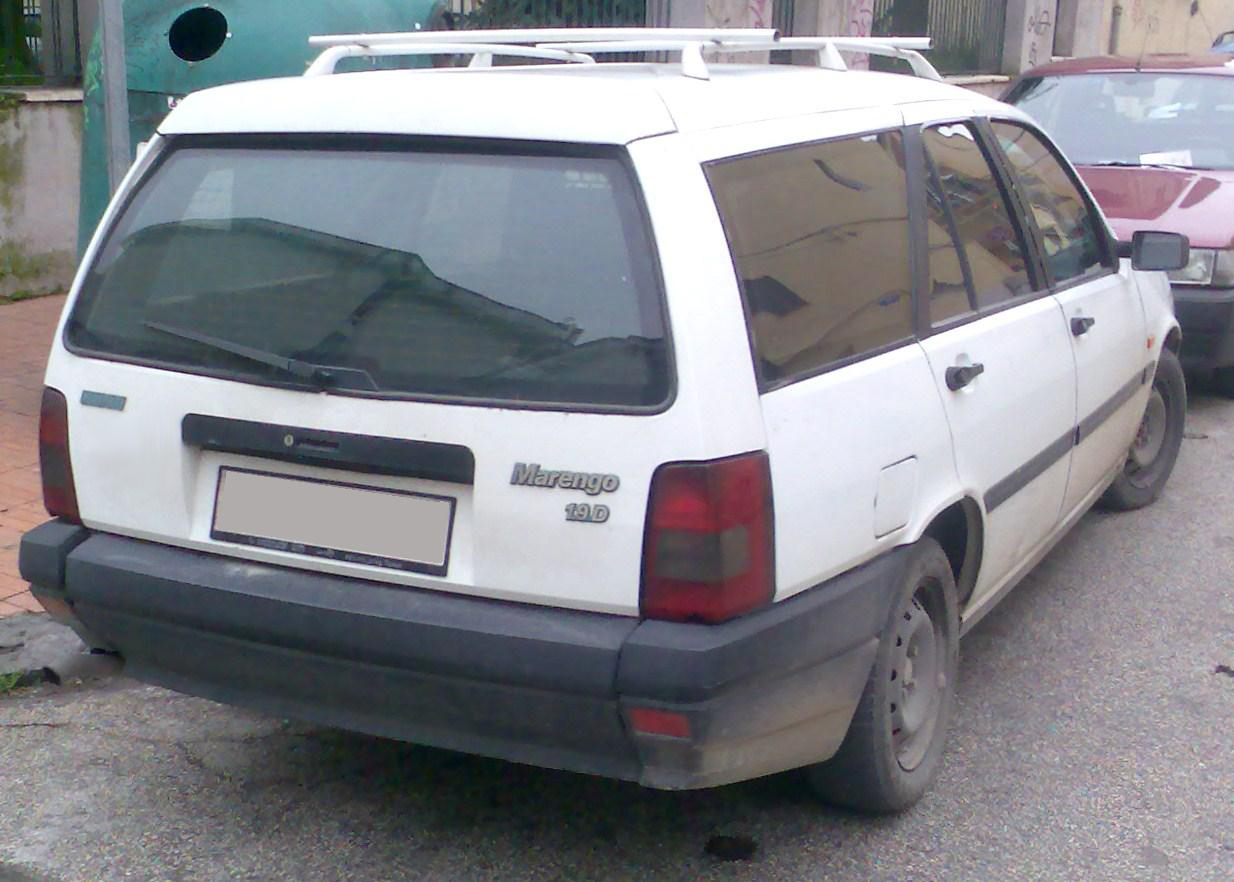
Third generation (Tempra)

When the Regata Weekend was replaced by the Tempra SW in 1990, the Marengo followed suit for 1991. The engine remained the same, although a turbodiesel was also added to the lineup. The Marengo received a number of safety upgrades in April 1993, including an energy absorbing steering wheel, adjustable seat belts, and an optional driver's side airbag.

== Fourth generation ==
The Tempra based Marengo was replaced by a version built on the new Marea in 1997. The nameplate was then retired, but the van version of the Fiat Stilo Multiwagon (2003) occupies the same slot in the marketplace and is the closest thing to a successor. As with its predecessors, the fourth Marengo has a more robust interior, and the rear doors cannot be opened from the inside.

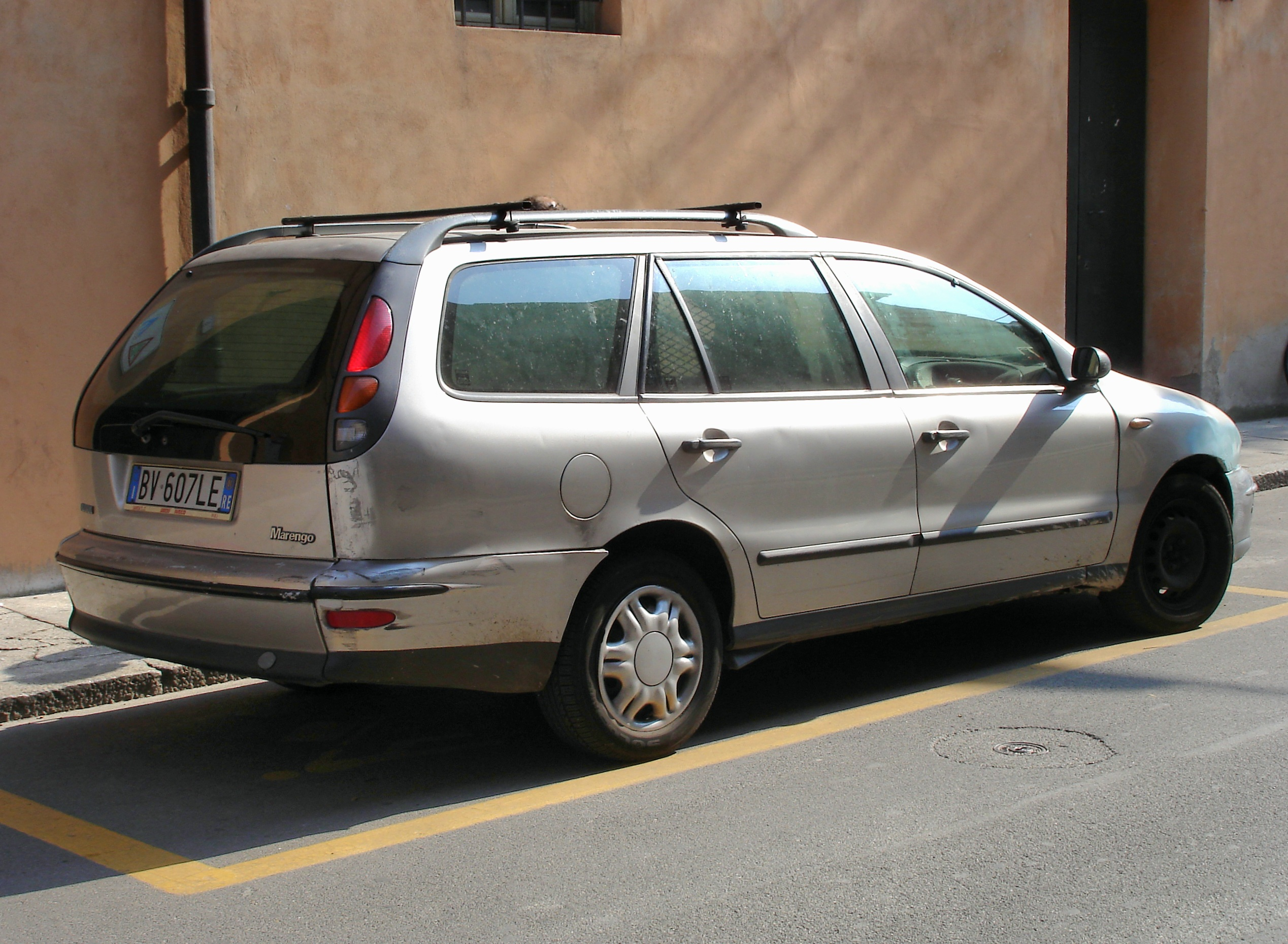
Fourth generation (Marea)
