= Ptolis =

Ptolis (Ancient Greek: Πτόλις) was a town in ancient Arcadia, which may have been the original site of the city of Mantineia.

Pausanias places Ptolis on the more easterly road from between Mantineia and Orchomenus, and indicates that its ruins were thirty stadia from the ruins of Maera.

Its site is unlocated.
