= Fiat Marea =

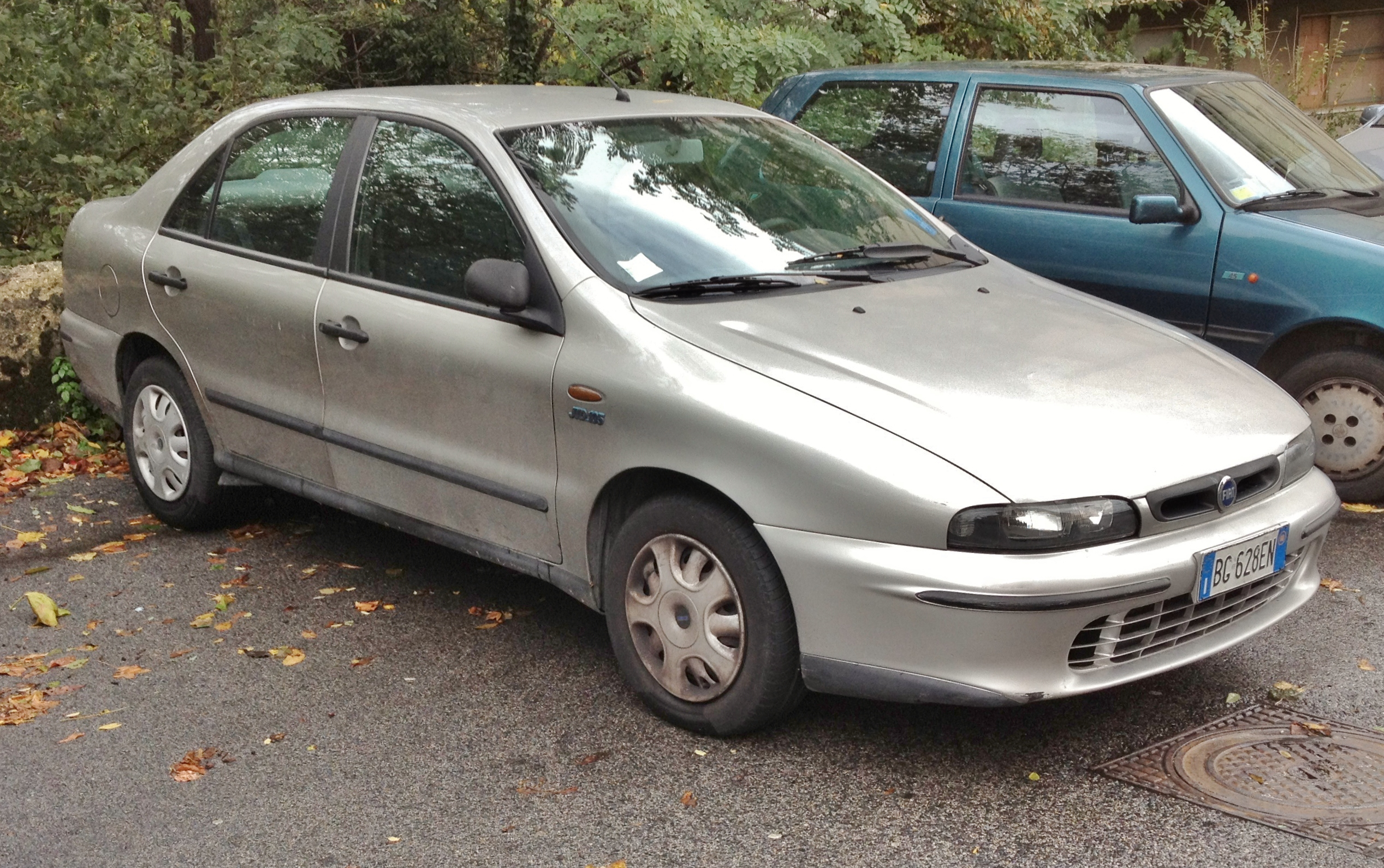
- Fiat Marea 1.9 JTD 105

Overview
- Manufacturer: Fiat
- Also called: Fiat Marengo (panel van)
- Production: 1996–2002 (Italy and Poland); 1998–2007 (Brazil); 1999–2007 (Turkey)
- Assembly: Italy: Turin, Mirafiori; Italy: Cassino Plant, Piedimonte San Germano; Italy: Rivalta; Brazil: Betim, Minas Gerais; Turkey: Osmangazi, Bursa Province (Tofaş); Poland: Tychy (Fiat Auto Poland)
- Designer: Centro Stile Fiat: Mauro Basso (saloon); Antonio Piovano (estate)

Body and chassis
- Class: Small family car (C)
- Body style: 4-door saloon 5-door estate
- Layout: Front-engine, front-wheel-drive
- Platform: Fiat C1
- Related: Alfa Romeo 147; Alfa Romeo 156; Alfa Romeo GT; Fiat Bravo/Brava; Fiat Multipla; Lancia Lybra

Powertrain
- Engine: petrol: 1.25 L I4; 1.4 L I4; 1.6 L I4; 1.8 L I4; 2.0 L I5; 2.0 L turbo I5; 2.4 L I5 (Brazil); BiPower: 1.6 L I4; diesel: 1.9 L turbo I4; 2.4 L turbo I5

Dimensions
- Wheelbase: 2,540 mm (100.0 in)
- Length: 4,391 mm (172.9 in) (saloon); 4,490 mm (176.8 in) (estate)
- Width: 1,740 mm (68.5 in)
- Height: 1,420 mm (55.9 in) (saloon); 1,535 mm (60.4 in) (estate)
- Kerb weight: 1,085–1,385 kg (2,392–3,053 lb)

Chronology
- Predecessor: Fiat Tempra; Fiat Croma
- Successor: Fiat Linea (for saloon); Fiat Stilo Multi Wagon (for estate)

The Fiat Marea (Type 185) is a small family car produced by the Italian automaker Fiat from 1996 to 2007. Available as a saloon and an estate, the Marea models were essentially different body styles of Fiat's hatchback offerings, the Bravo and Brava. The Marea replaced the earlier Tipo-based Fiat Tempra, as well as the larger Croma.

While the Fiat Stilo Multi Wagon was the successor of the estate version, the Marea Weekend, the Fiat Linea replaced the saloon version in 2007. The car became officially available from 11 September 1996.

== Production and markets ==
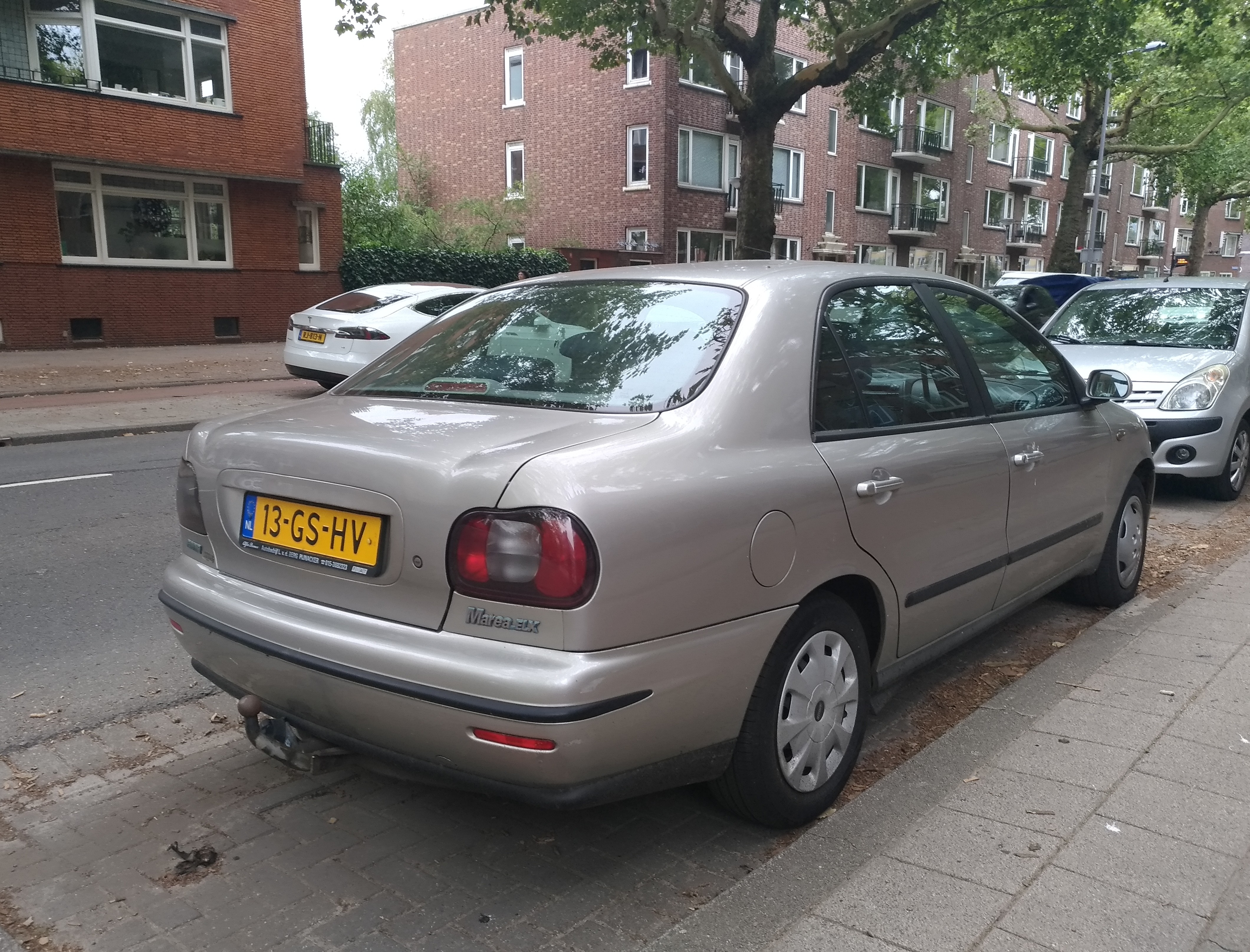
Fiat Marea 1.6 EL (rear)

The Marea was originally manufactured in Fiat's Cassino and Mirafiori plants in Italy. Later the Marea also superseded the Tempra in Brazilian (Betim) and Turkish (in Bursa, with Tofaş) plants, which make vehicles mostly for local and other developing markets.

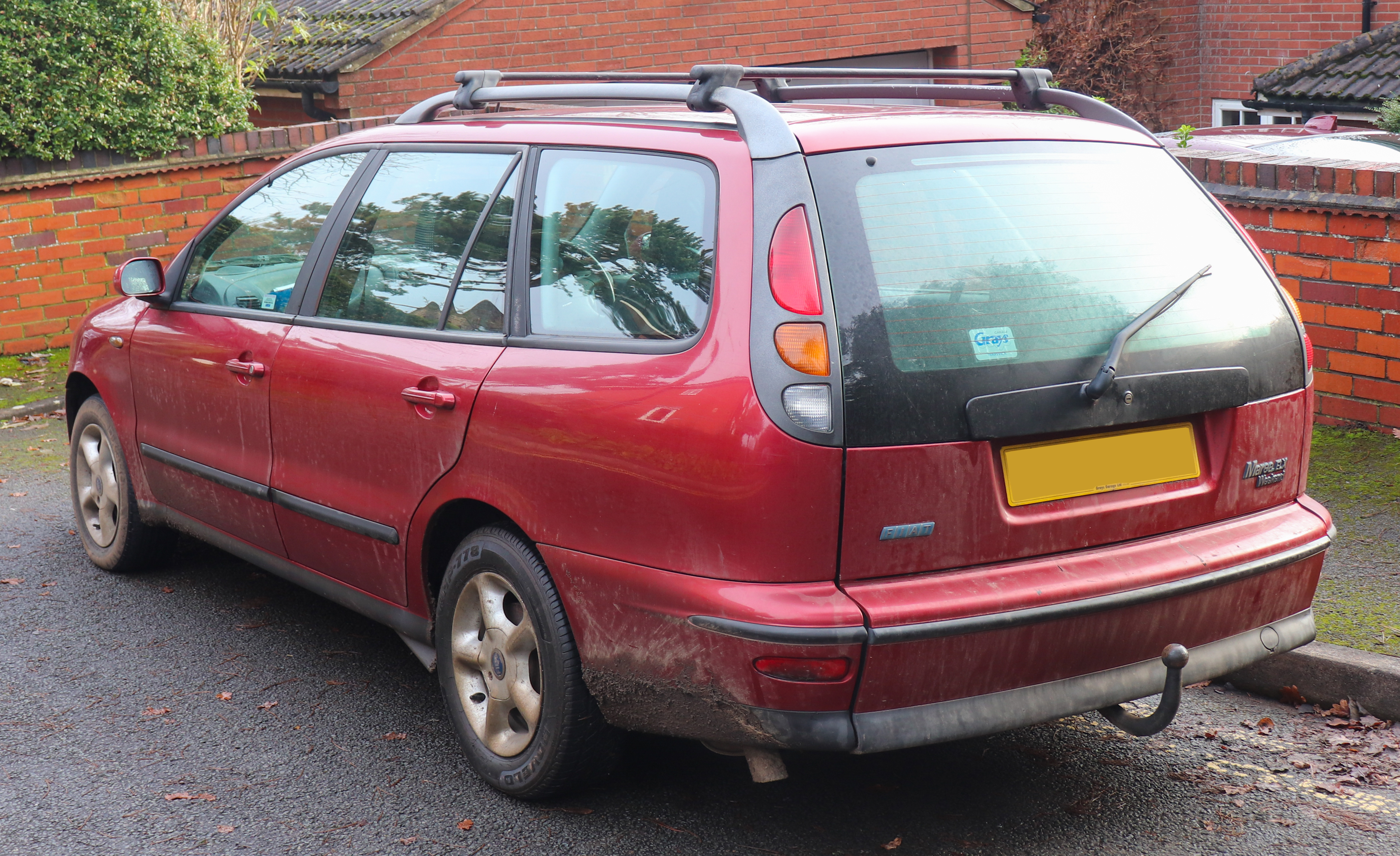
2001 Fiat Marea Weekend 1.9 JTD 110 ELX (UK)

In the UK, the Marea saloon was offered in SX, ELX, and HLX trim levels. The SX could be ordered with the choice of 1.6-litre petrol engine with 103 PS, as well as the choice of 1.9-litre turbo diesel engine with 75 or 100 PS. There were 4 different engines for the ELX, they were the 1.6, 1.8, and 2.0-litre 20 valve petrol engine, or 100 PS 1.9-litre turbo diesel engine. Engine for the top-of-the-line HLX was either the higher performance 2.0-litre 20 valve petrol with 147 PS, or 124 PS 2.4-litre turbo diesel engine.

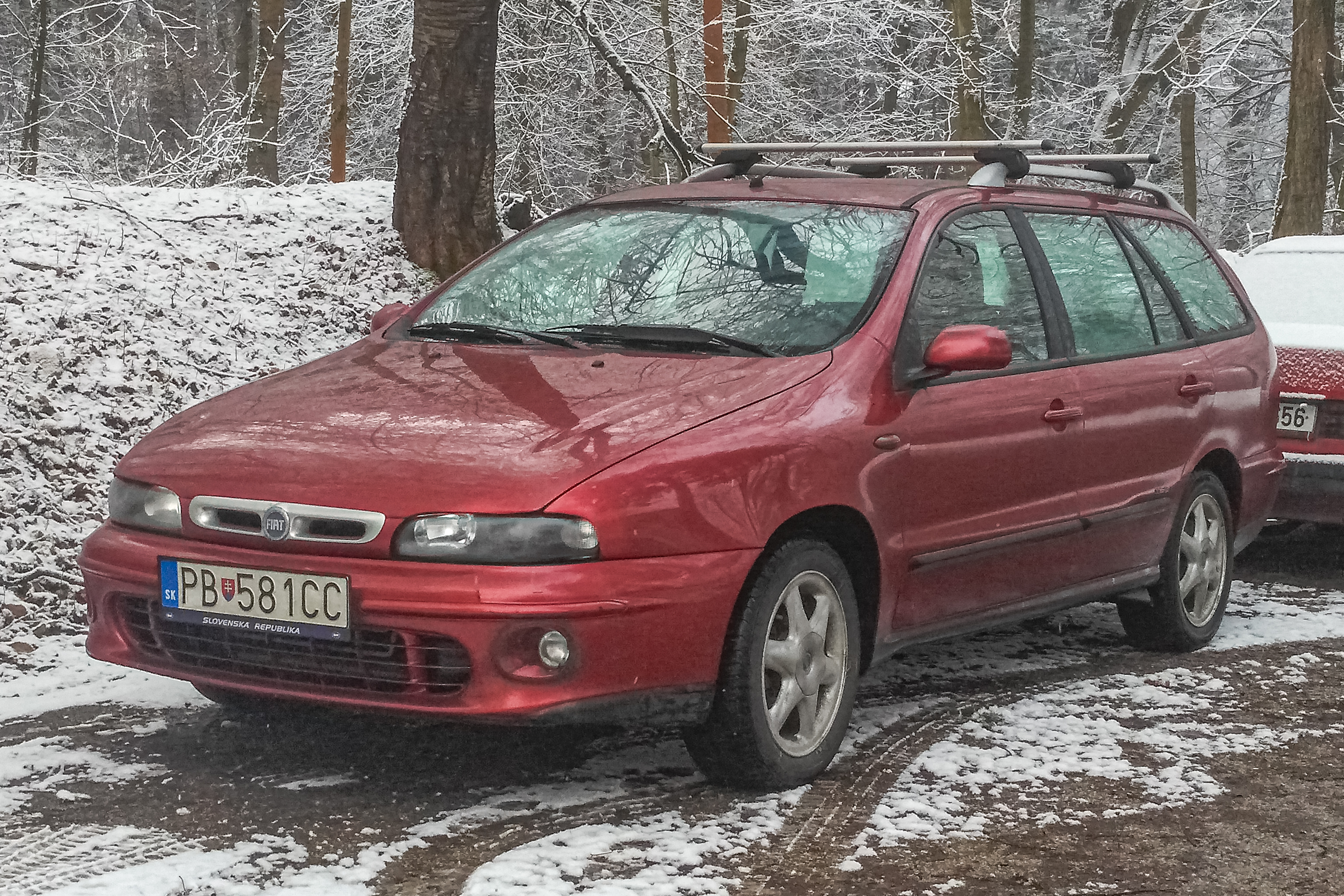
Fiat Marea Weekend 1.9 JTD

In Europe, production and sales of the Marea ceased in August 2002, one year after the Bravo and Brava were replaced with the Fiat Stilo. The Marea Weekend was replaced by the Stilo Multiwagon unveiled in January 2003, while the saloon's successor, the Fiat Linea, was unveiled in 2007.

Nevertheless, the Marea (in both body styles) was still manufactured in Turkey and Brazil for local (and other Latin American) markets. The Brazilian version was facelifted in 2001, when it gained a redesigned rear end with taillights taken from the Lancia Lybra.

For 2006, the Marea was mildly revised again, gaining a new rear end, and a new grille, similar in style to other current Fiat models. In mid 2007, Brazilian production of the Marea and Marea Weekend ceased.

== Engines ==
The Marea petrol and JTD engines 1.6 L, 1.8 L and 2.0 L petrol and 1.9 L were sourced from the Brava and Bravo, and a 2.0 20v turbo option from the Fiat Coupé was also available. For a short time there was also a 2.4 turbodiesel available, dropped in 2001, which has become sought after. A BiPower 1.6 L dual fuel engine was later added to the range. It can run on either petrol or compressed natural gas.

- 1.2 L I4 16v 1,242 cc 86 PS (63 kW; 85 hp) - select markets, such as Greece and Portugal
- 1.4 L I4 12v 1,370 cc 80 PS (59 kW; 79 hp) - select markets, such as Greece and Portugal
- 1.6 L I4 16v 1,581 cc 103 PS (76 kW; 102 hp)
- 1.6 L I4 16v 1,581 cc 99 PS (73 kW; 98 hp)
- 1.8 L I4 16v 1,747 cc 114 PS (84 kW; 112 hp)
- 2.0 L I5 20v 1,998 cc 155 PS (114 kW; 153 hp)
- 2.0 L I5 20v turbo 1,998 cc 182 PS (134 kW; 180 hp)
- 1.9 turbodiesel I4 8v 75 PS (55 kW; 74 hp)
- 1.9 turbodiesel I4 8v 100 PS (74 kW; 99 hp)
- 1.9 common rail (JTD) turbodiesel I4 8v 105 PS (77 kW; 104 hp)
- 1.9 common rail (JTD) turbodiesel I4 8v 110 PS (81 kW; 108 hp)
- 2.4 turbodiesel 2,387 cc I5 10v 126 PS (93 kW; 124 hp)
- 2.4 common rail (JTD) turbodiesel 2,387 cc I5 10v 132 PS (97 kW; 130 hp)

== Brazil ==
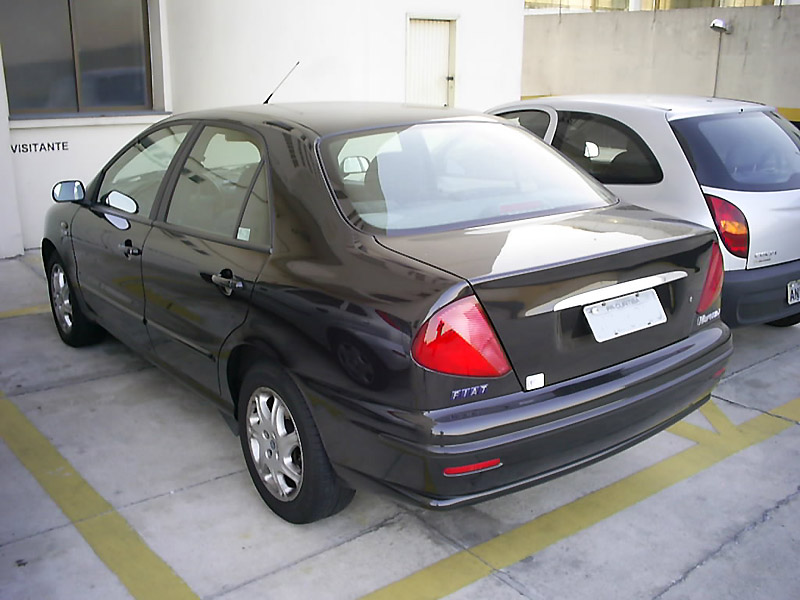
Brazilian-spec Fiat Marea (first facelift)

The Brazilian-built Fiat Marea was available in saloon and estate body styles and arrived at dealerships in June 1998. It was originally launched with two trim levels: the mid-level ELX and the high-level HLX. The Marea Weekend estate was imported from Italy in small numbers until local production commenced in September 1998.

A 142 PS (104 kW; 140 hp) 2.0-litre petrol engine was standard, although a lower output version producing 127 PS (93 kW; 125 hp) was launched later the same year for the base-trim SX model. This was done to reduce Brazilian excise taxes on industrial products (IPI) from 30% to 25% for that model. A sporty Turbo trim with a 2.0L petrol engine producing 182 PS (134 kW; 180 hp) was also made available. Retail prices went from 27.582 BRL for a base SX model up to 41.748 BRL for a Turbo model. No diesel engines were available for the Brazilian markets, as local legislation prohibits diesel-powered cars.

In 2000, the 2.0L engine was replaced with a 2.4-litre, 160 PS (118 kW; 158 hp) engine for the ELX and HLX trims, and with a 1.8-litre 132 PS (97 kW; 130 hp) engine for the SX trim.

The following year, the Brazilian-market Marea received a facelift, with a new front grille and new tail lights borrowed from the Lancia Lybra. A four-speed automatic transmission also became available.

For the 2005 model year, in an attempt to address declining sales, the Marea received a minor facelift and a new entry-level engine option was offered, an Argentine-built 1.6-litre engine producing 106 PS (78 kW; 105 hp) – the only engine used in the Marea that was not brought in from Italy.

A total of 54,781 units were built in Brazil until the end of its production in November 2007.
