= Fiat Regata =

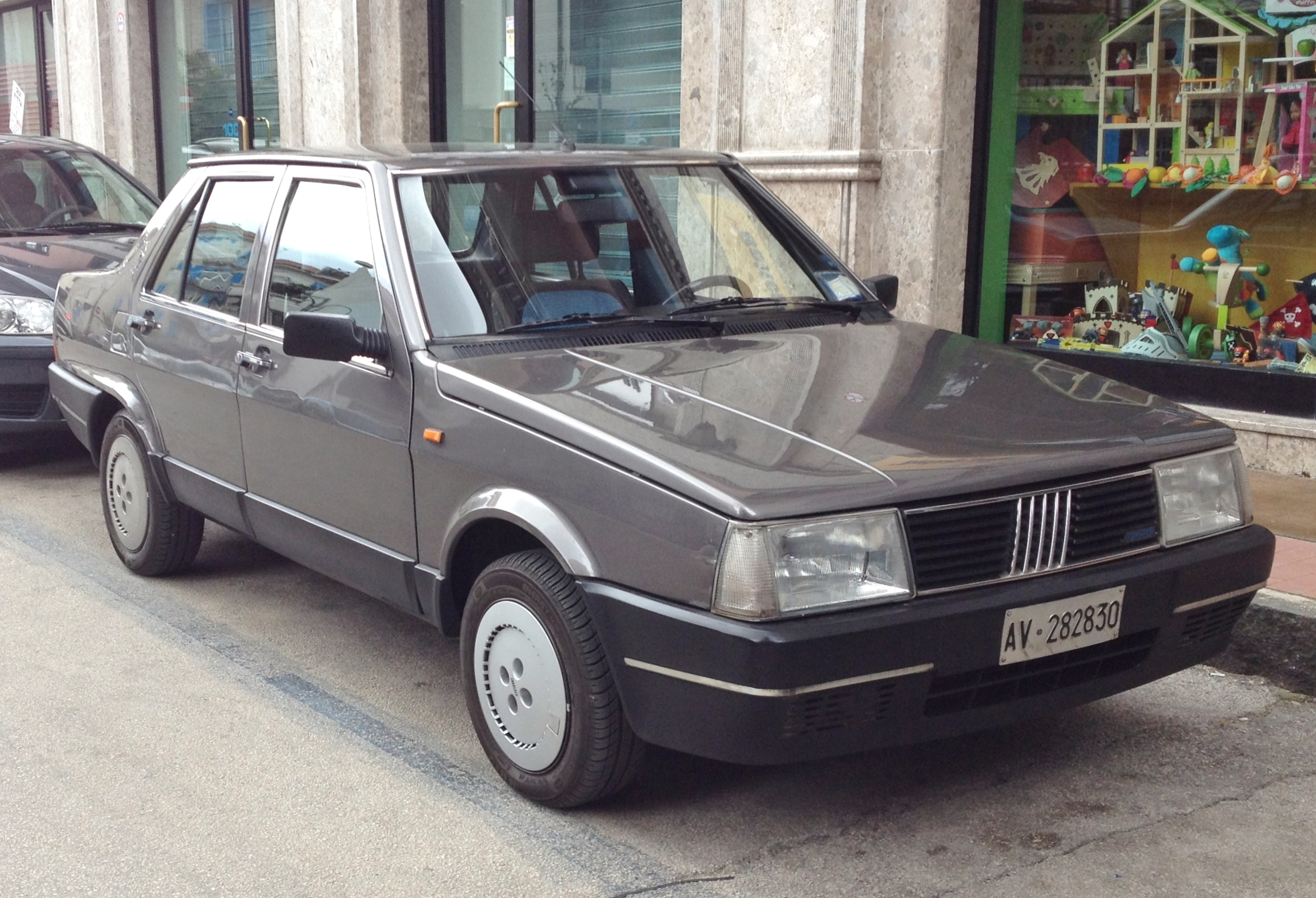
- Fiat Regata Sedan

Overview
- Manufacturer: Fiat
- Also called: Fiat Marengo (Van); Fiat Regatta (Sweden, Latin America)
- Production: 1983–1990 (Italy); 1985–1995 (Argentina)
- Assembly: Italy: Mirafiori, Turin; Argentina: Córdoba (Sevel)

Body and chassis
- Class: Small family car
- Body style: 4-door saloon 5-door estate (Weekend)
- Layout: FF layout
- Related: Fiat Ritmo; SEAT Málaga

Powertrain
- Engine: petrol: 1.1 L I4 (Greece); 1.3 L I4; 1.4 L I4 (Latin America); 1.5 L I4; 1.6 L I4; 2.0 L I4 (Latin America); diesel: 1.7 L I4; 1.9 L I4; 1.9 L turbo I4

Dimensions
- Wheelbase: 2,446 mm (96.3 in); 2,448 mm (96.4 in) Weekend 1985
- Length: 4,260 mm (167.7 in); 4,267 mm (168.0 in) Weekend 1985
- Width: 1,650 mm (65.0 in)
- Height: 1,412 mm (55.6 in)
- Curb weight: 890–1,035 kg (1,962–2,282 lb)

Chronology
- Predecessor: Fiat 131
- Successor: Fiat Tempra

The Fiat Regata is an automobile produced by Italian automaker Fiat from 1983 until 1990. The Regata name was used for the sedan and station wagon versions of the Fiat Ritmo hatchback, corresponding to the post-facelift Ritmo. The Regata was offered with a choice of three petrol and two diesel engines, although Fiat's Argentinean operations installed other engines from later Fiat models as production there continued until 1995.

Spanish builder SEAT created a similar saloon car from Ritmo underpinnings called the SEAT Málaga, but development of the two cars was carried out separately.

== 1983 ==
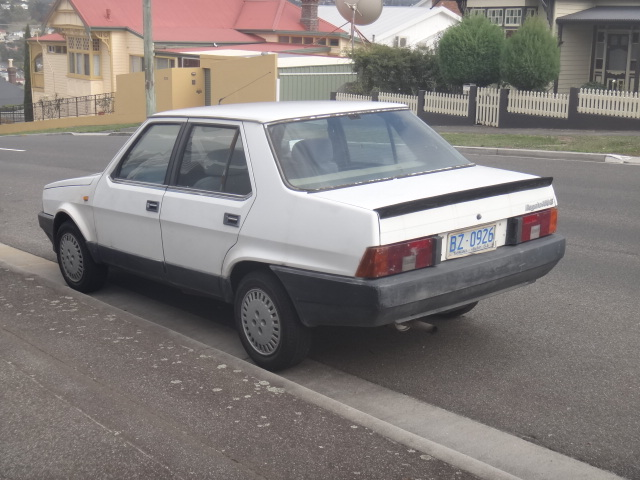
Pre facelift Fiat Regata S (Australia)

The Regata, unveiled at the Frankfurt Motor Show in September 1983, was developed from the pre facelift Ritmo (which had been known in United Kingdom and United States markets as the Fiat Strada) and utilised almost all the mechanicals, although the wheelbase was stretched slightly. It was also aimed at a higher price point with an improved level of trim and standard equipment compared to the Ritmo/Strada upon which it was based, mirroring a trend among European manufacturers to push the sedan versions of C-segment hatchbacks more upmarket (similar to contemporaries such as the Ford Orion and Volkswagen Jetta).

A conventional four door three box design, it bore very little external resemblance to the original Ritmo, although it hinted strongly at the look of the facelift of 1982 for that car. In the Swedish market, the car was called "Regatta", as Regata was uncomfortably close to a derogatory term for an overbearing woman.

The Regatta designation was also used on South American markets, except Venezuela. The engines offered were also similar, being the 1301 cc inline four rated at 68 hp (50 kW) (Regata 70) and the 1498 cc model rated at 82 hp (60 kW) (Regata 85).

Both of these were SOHC engines. A DOHC 1585 cc inline four rated at 100 hp (74 kW) (Regata 100) was also available as were two SOHC diesels, a 1714 cc straight four rated at 58 hp (43 kW) (Regata D) and a 1929 cc version rated at 65 hp (48 kW) (Regata DS), the latter of which was added in 1984.

After fourteen months, diesels represented about thirty per cent of the Regatas produced. The Regata 100, as the top model, was well equipped and came with a "check panel", an early onboard computer that provided information on fuel consumption, average speed, range, optimal gear selection, etcetera.

An economy model called the "ES" ("Energy Saving") was also available, it featured an early start-stop system. It featured some detail modifications to the aerodynamics, an optimised (higher compression ratio and different valve timing) version of the 1301 cc engine rated at 65 hp (48 kW), an engine shut off system (when idling) and electronic ignition.

Aside from the lowest priced versions, a five speed manual transmission came as standard on the Regata.

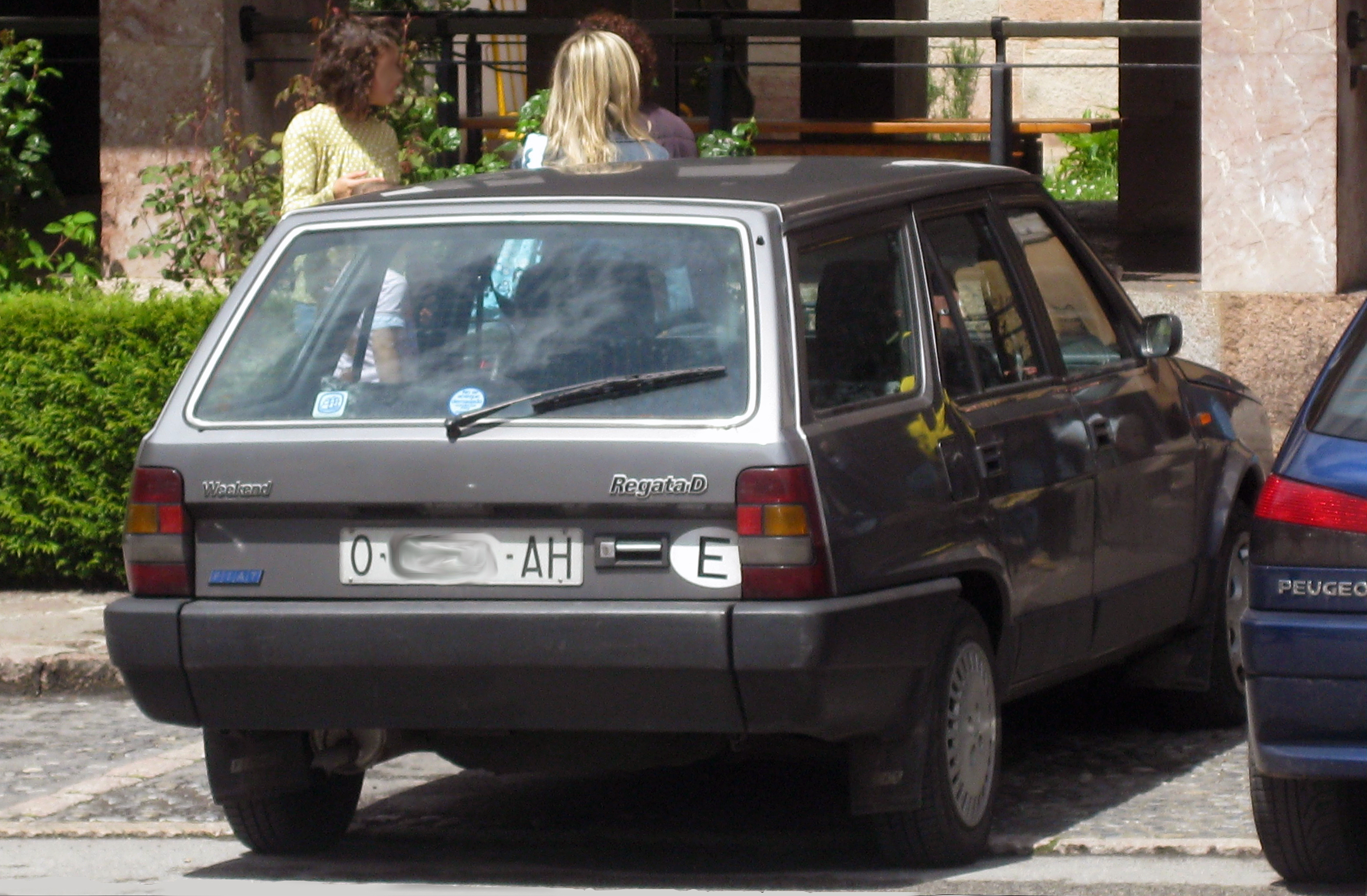
Rear view of a 1986 Fiat Regata D Weekend (pre-facelift), showing the portion of the rear bumper which could be folded down

The Regata Weekend estate was introduced in November 1984. It was available with all engines offered in the sedan, although there was no optional automatic transmission available in the Regata Weekend. The Weekend replaced the 131 Panorama, which had been kept in production alongside the Regata. The Weekend featured a folding rear bumper, enabling easier access to the load area and doubling as a seat capable of supporting 150 kg (330 lb) when folded down.

The suspension and brakes were uprated to cope with the extra weight. Alongside there was also a two-seater glazed van derivative called the Marengo, only available with the larger diesel engine. The Marengo made its debut at the Brussels Commercial vehicle show in the beginning of 1985.

== 1986 ==
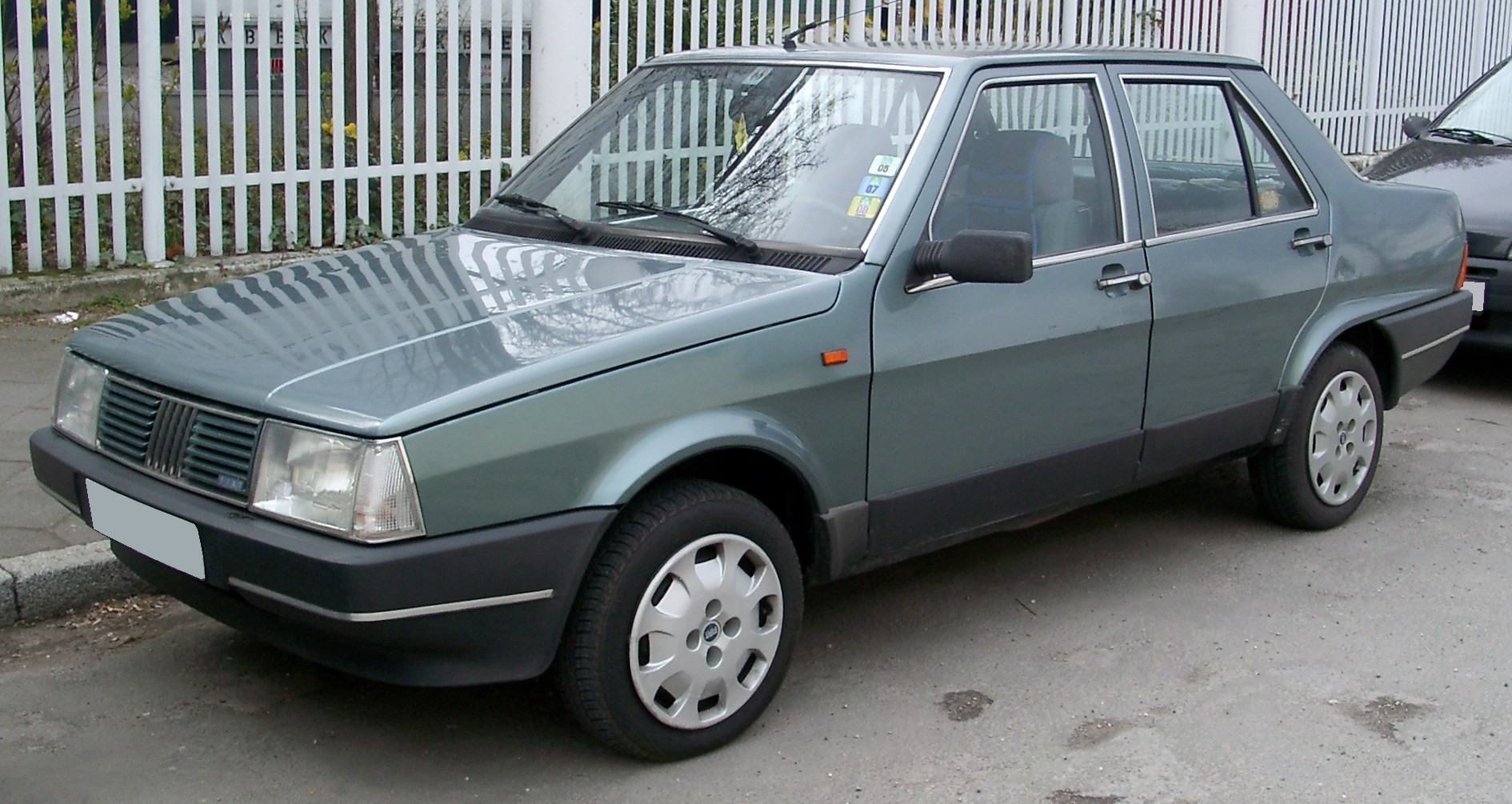
Facelift Fiat Regata (Europe)

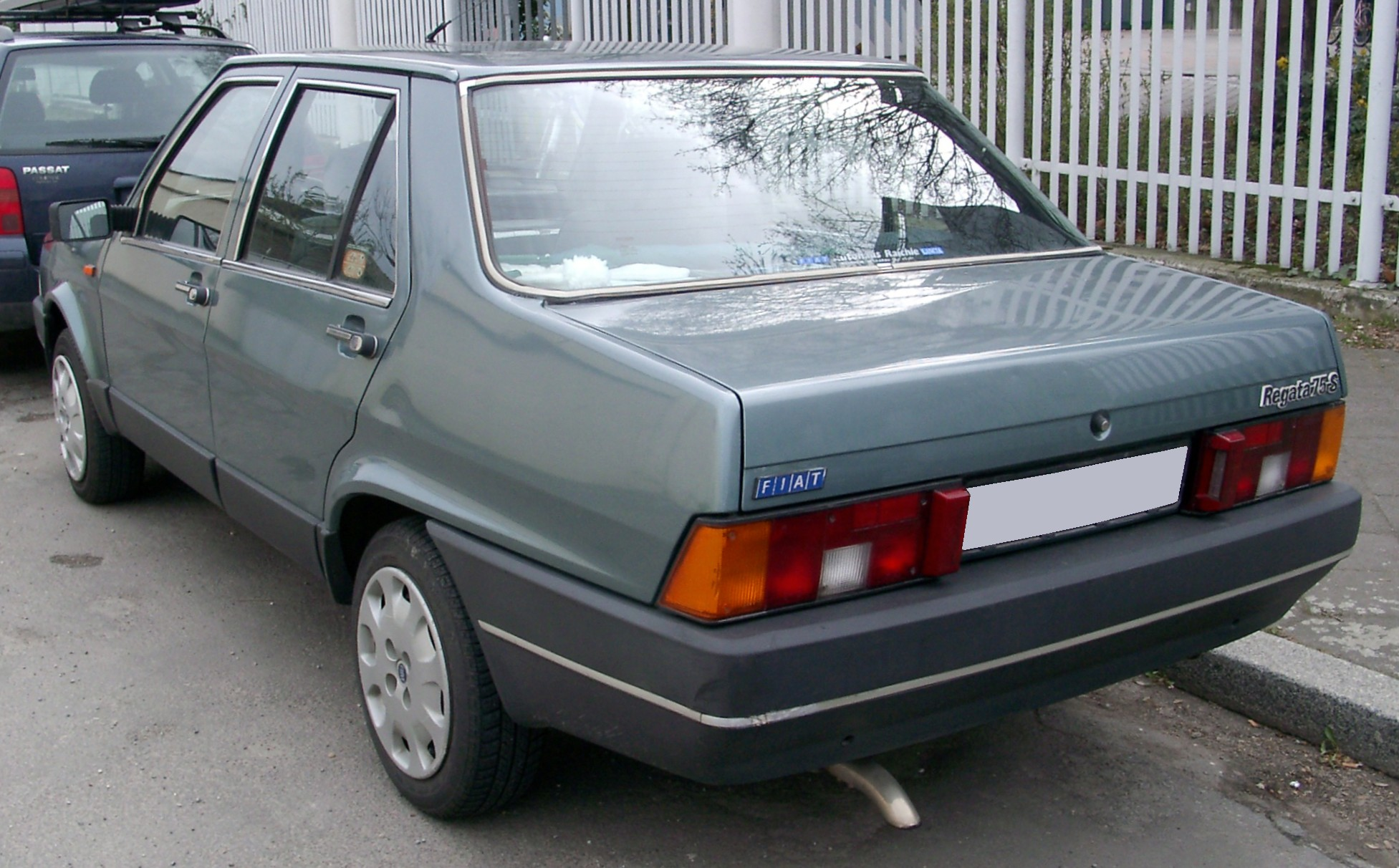
Facelift Fiat Regata (Europe)

A mid-life update was carried out in April 1986, in which numerous small details were changed, most notably new doors with an altered window line. New door handles, grille, bumpers and wheel trims also featured. The rain gutters were also modified; the changes combined lowered the drag resistance from Cd=0.37 to 0.35.

The 1,585 cc engine gained fuel injection to become the 100S i.e. (also available with a catalytic converter, losing some power and becoming the 90 i.e.) whilst a catalysed and fuel injected 1,498 cc unit powered the 75 i.e. The 85 Automatic was also replaced by the 70 Automatic with a 1.3 litre engine rated at 65 hp (48 kW).

The diesel powered models also changed slightly. An 80 hp (59 kW) 1,929 cc turbodiesel engine was introduced, badged Regata Turbo DS. The 1,714 cc unit dropped in capacity to 1,697 cc but gained power to 60 hp (44 kW), and had reduced fuel consumption. This model was simply badged as the Regata D. The weight was also reduced slightly. Production ceased in February 1990, when the Tempra was introduced.

== Sevel production ==
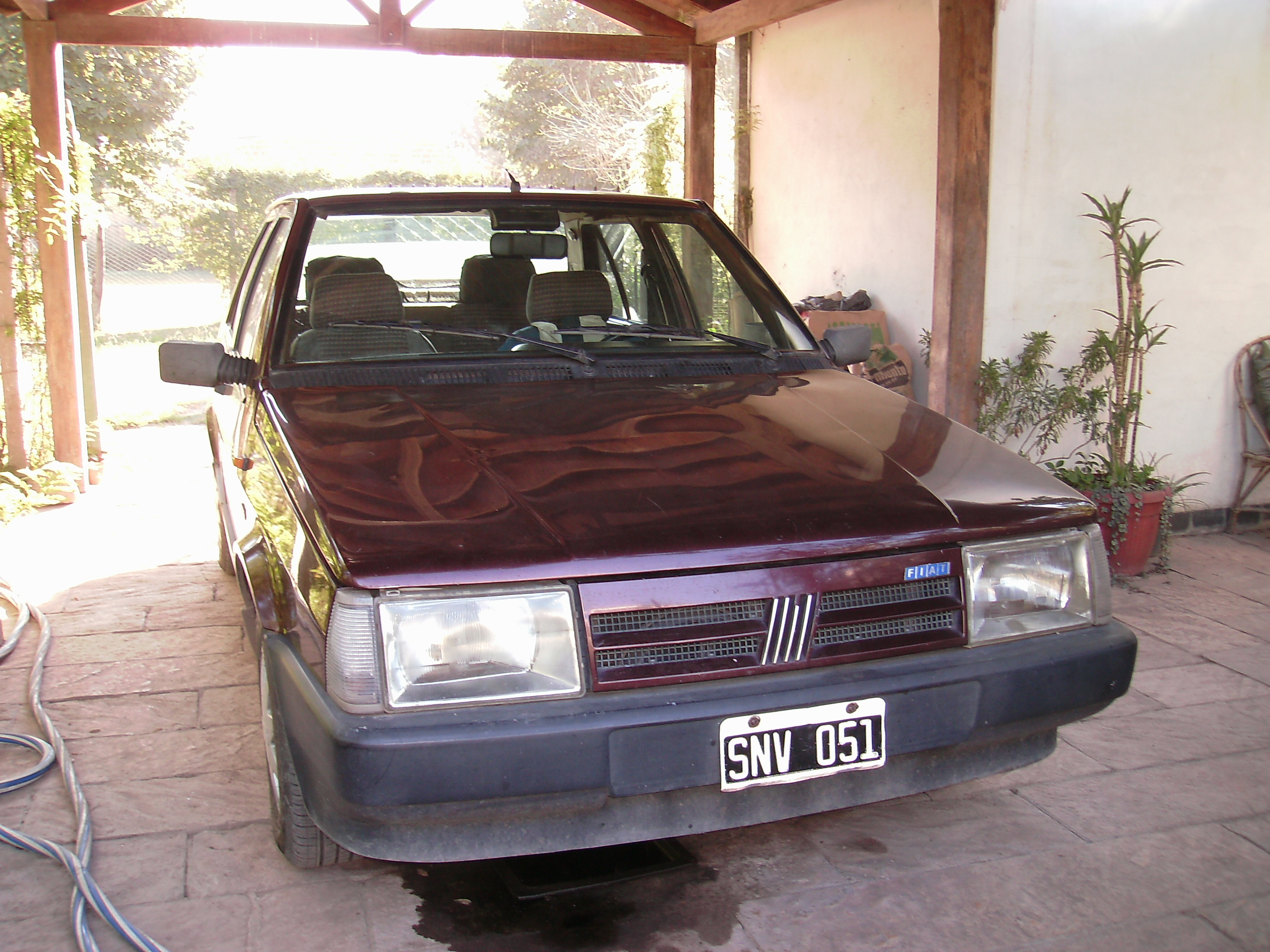
Sevel built Regatta (1993)

The Regata started production by Sevel in Argentina in 1985, where production continued until 1995. 56,789 were built in Argentina, with limited exports to select South American nations with lower barriers for entry such as Venezuela and Chile. As in Sweden, the car was called the Regatta in Latin America. Unlike its European sisters, the car was considered somewhat upmarket in Latin America.

The Regatta 85 received an 82 hp (60 kW) 1.5 litre, while a 100S came with a 100 hp (74 kW) 1.6 litre version. The 85 was available in either base or "full" versions. Along with a light facelift in November 1987, the 2000 Twincam replaced the 100S, carrying the same level of equipment but with the Croma's larger Twin Cam two-litre engine with 10 more horsepower and considerably more torque. The Regatta 85 changed names, becoming the Regatta 1.5 S (Super) and SC (Super Confort, corresponding to the earlier full version).

The new 2000 managed the 0–100 km/h sprint in 9.8 seconds and had a rear spoiler. Top speed was claimed to be 182 km/h (113 mph).

A more thorough facelift in 1988 produced the Regatta Edición II. The engines remained the same until the 1990 model year, when both engines were replaced by the 87 hp (64 kW) 1581 cc engine from the Fiat Tipo. Later, a cheaper 1.4 S using the 1372 cc Tipo engine, with 63 hp (46 kW), was added to the line up.

Production ended in 1995, as the Regata was replaced by the Tempra in Latin America as well. The Regatta Weekend (Station Wagon) was also produced in Argentina between 1986 and 1992, initially only available with the 1.5 engine. For the last three years, this was replaced with the Tipo's 1.6 litre engine.

== Engines ==
=== Petrol ===
Model	Engine	Displacement	Power	Torque	Notes
60	I4	1116 cc	44 kW (60 hp) at 5?00 rpm		Greece, perhaps others
70	I4	1301 cc	48 kW (65 hp) at 5600 rpm	100 N⋅m (74 lb⋅ft) at 3000 rpm	
70	I4	1301 cc	50 kW (68 hp) at 5700 rpm	100 N⋅m (74 lb⋅ft) at 2900 rpm	
1.4 S	I4	1372 cc	46 kW (63 hp) at 5800 rpm	102 N⋅m (75 lb⋅ft) at 3000 rpm	Latin America
75 i.e.	I4	1498 cc	55 kW (75 hp) at 5800 rpm	108 N⋅m (80 lb⋅ft) at 3000 rpm	
85; 1.5 S/SC	I4	1498 cc	60 kW (82 hp) at 5500 rpm	122 N⋅m (90 lb⋅ft) at 2900 rpm 120 N⋅m (89 lb⋅ft) at 3000 rpm	Latin America
1.6 S/SC	I4	1581 cc	64 kW (87 hp) at 6000 rpm	130 N⋅m (96 lb⋅ft) at 3000 rpm	Latin America
90 i.e.	I4	1585 cc	66 kW (90 hp) at 6250 rpm	122 N⋅m (90 lb⋅ft) at 4250 rpm	
100 S	I4	1585 cc	74 kW (100 hp) at 5900 rpm	133 N⋅m (98 lb⋅ft) at 3800 rpm	
100 S i.e.	I4	1585 cc	74 kW (100 hp) at 6000 rpm	128 N⋅m (94 lb⋅ft) at 4000 rpm	
2000 Twincam	I4	1995 cc	81 kW (110 hp) at 5000 rpm	163 N⋅m (120 lb⋅ft) at 5900 rpm	Latin America

=== Diesel ===
Model	Engine	Displacement	Power	Torque	Years
1.7 D	I4	1714 cc	43 kW (58 hp) at 4500 rpm	103 N⋅m (76 lbf⋅ft) at 3000 rpm	1983–1986
1.7 D	I4	1697 cc	44 kW (60 hp) at 4500 rpm	103 N⋅m (76 lbf⋅ft) at 3000 rpm	1986–
1.9 D	I4	1929 cc	48 kW (65 hp) at 4600 rpm	119 N⋅m (88 lbf⋅ft) at 2000 rpm	1984–
1.9 TD	I4	1929 cc	59 kW (80 hp) at 4200 rpm	172 N⋅m (127 lb⋅ft) at 2400 rpm	1986–

== Scale models ==
Polistil manufactured a 1/25 and a 1/41 scale diecast Regata. A 1/43 variant of this car was made by Bburago, Norev (for Hachette Fiat Story) and Elite Models.
