= Marea =

Marea may refer to:

- Marea (ancient city), Egypt
- Mare' or Marea, a town in Syria
- Marea (band), a Spanish hard rock band
- Marea (restaurant), New York City
- Marea Stamper (born 1977), American singer, songwriter, DJ, and record producer, known professionally as the Blessed Madonna
- Lake Mariout, Egypt, once called Marea

== Other uses ==
- Fiat Marea
- MAREA, a transatlantic communications cable

== See also ==
- Marea (We've Lost Dancing), a 2021 song by Fred Again and the Blessed Madonna
- Maria (disambiguation)
- Mare, a female horse
