= SS Maria =

A number of steamships were named Maria

- SS Maria (1921), a Belgian cargo ship in service during 1957
- SS Maria (1927), a Dutch cargo ship in service during 1951
- Maria (1938–1941) Danish ship ex Caravelle, ex Helga, served as USS Uranus (AF-14), returned Denmark, renamed Maria Dan then Greek Michael
