= Maria language =

Maria language may refer to:

- Maria language (India) or Madiya, a Gondi (Dravidian) language of India
- Maria language (Papua New Guinea), a Manubaran (Papuan) language of Papua New Guinea
