= Maera (Arcadia) =

Maera or Maira (Ancient Greek: Μαῖρα) was a town in ancient Arcadia.There was a tradition that indicated that there was the tomb of Meara, daughter or descendant of Atlas, according to Greek mythology, though a different tradition said that Maera, the daughter of Atlas, had been buried in Tegea.

Pausanias places Maera on one of the roads between Mantineia and Orchomenus, and indicates that its ruins were thirty stadia from the ruins of Ptolis, which was the original site where Mantineia had been built.
