= Fiat Stilo =

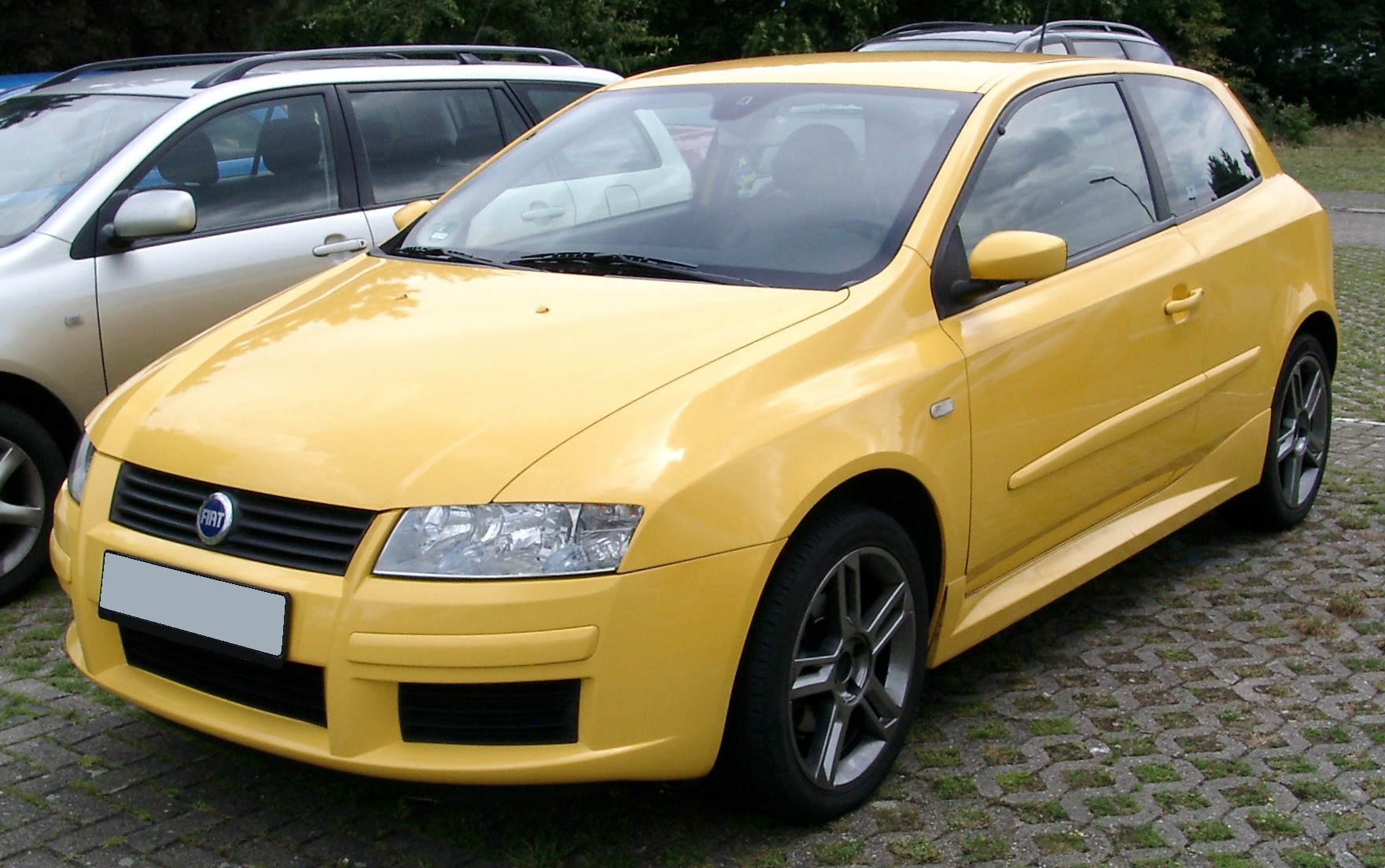

Overview
- Manufacturer: Fiat
- Production: 2000–2007 (Italy); September 2002–2010 (Brazil)
- Assembly: Italy: Cassino, Frosinone; Brazil: Betim, Minas Gerais
- Designer: Centro Stile Fiat: Peter Fassbender (design director); Mauro Basso (exterior); Peter Jansen (interior)

Body and chassis
- Class: Small family car (C)
- Body style: 3/5-door hatchback 5-door estate
- Layout: FF layout
- Platform: Fiat C2
- Related: Fiat Bravo (2007); Lancia Delta (2008)

Powertrain
- Engine: petrol: 1.2 L Fire I4; 1.4 L Fire I4; 1.6 L Torque I4; 1.6 L Ecotec I4; 1.8 L Family B I4; 2.4 L Family C I5; diesel: 1.9 L JTD I4; 1.9 L MultiJet I4
- Transmission: 5-speed manual 6-speed manual 5-speed automated manual (Selespeed)

Dimensions
- Wheelbase: 2,600 mm (102.4 in)
- Length: 4,182 mm (164.6 in) (3-door); 4,253 mm (167.4 in) (5-door); 4,516 mm (177.8 in) (estate)
- Width: 1,784 mm (70.2 in) (3-door); 1,756 mm (69.1 in) (5-door); 1,756 mm (69.1 in) (estate)
- Height: 1,475 mm (58.1 in) (3-door); 1,525 mm (60.0 in) (5-door); 1,570 mm (61.8 in) (estate)
- Curb weight: 1,090–1,320 kg (2,403–2,910 lb)

Chronology
- Predecessor: Fiat Bravo/Brava; Fiat Marea Weekend (for estate)
- Successor: Fiat Bravo; Fiat Tipo estate (for estate)

The Fiat Stilo (Type 192) is a small family car available as a three- and a five-door hatchback, as well as an estate (Fiat Stilo Multi Wagon), produced by Italian automaker Fiat. The Stilo hatchbacks were presented in March 2001 at the Bologna Motor Show, and launched on European market in October 2001 to replace the Fiat Bravo/Brava, with the Stilo Multi Wagon following in January 2003.

The Fiat Bravo was the successor of the Stilo in most markets, however, the five-door Stilo continued to be manufactured in Brazil until October 2010, when it too was replaced by the Bravo.

The Stilo came in third place in the European Car of the Year awards for 2002, behind the Peugeot 307 and Renault Laguna.

== Overview ==
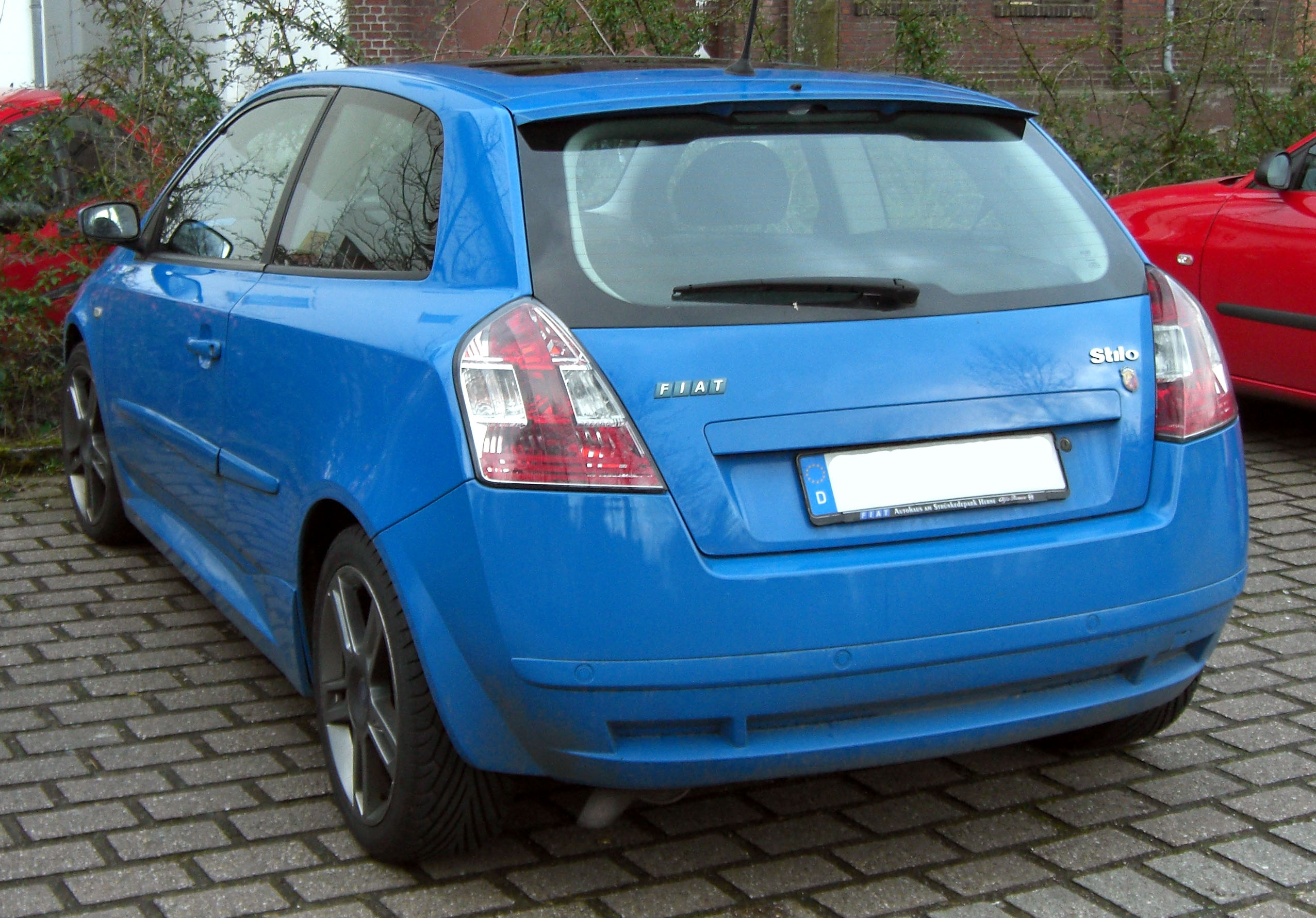
Fiat Stilo Abarth (three-door)

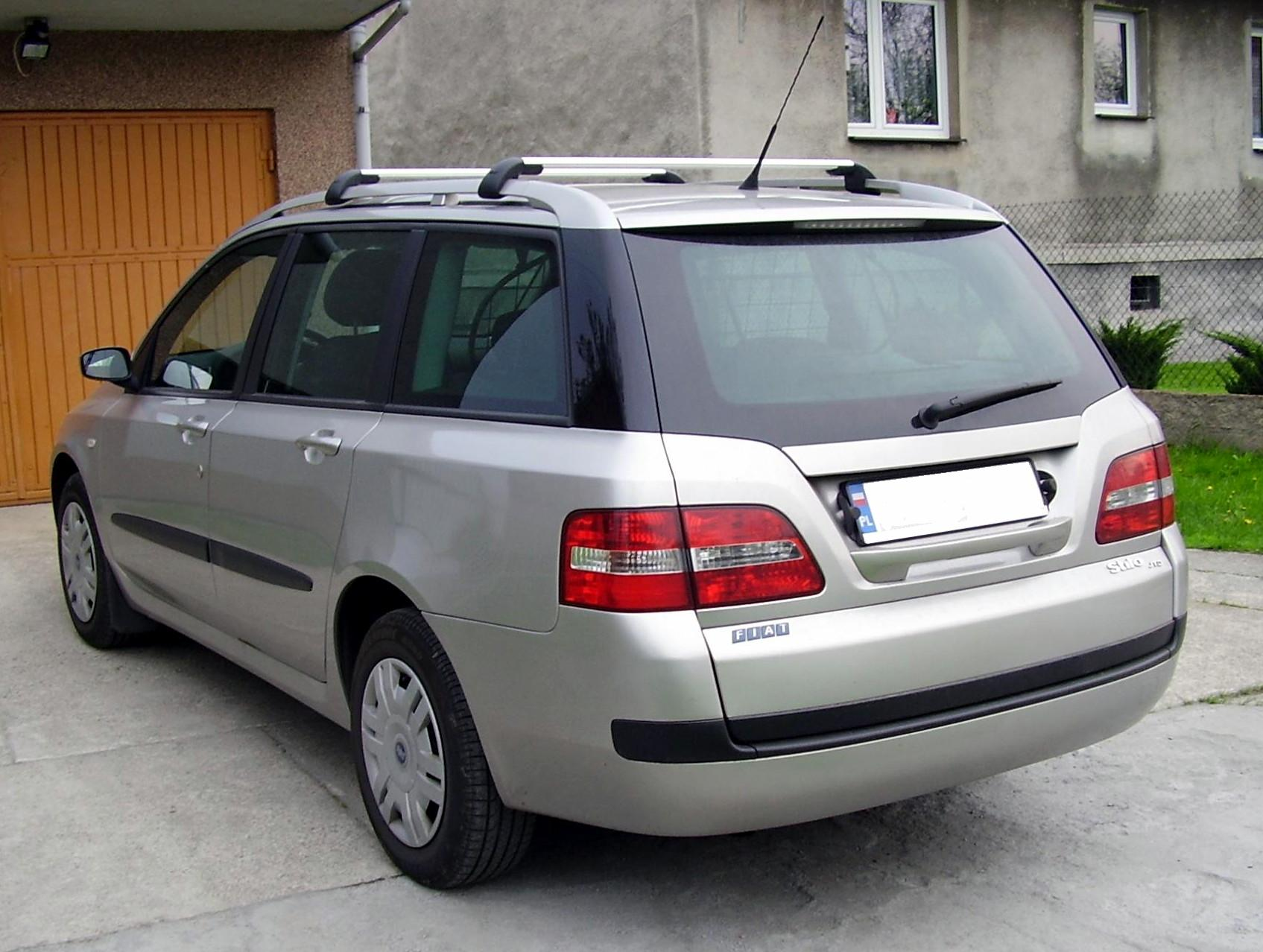
Fiat Stilo MultiWagon

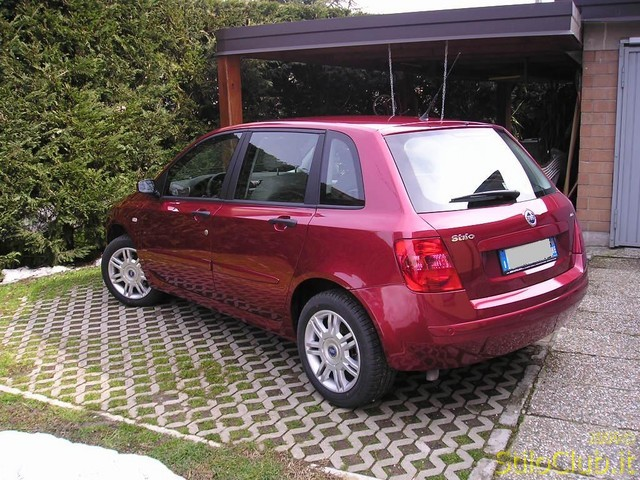
Fiat Stilo (five-door)

The Stilo's styling received mixed reviews, with many journalists and enthusiasts criticising it as being too bland and too German looking, as the styling of the preceding Bravo and Brava had been criticised for being too "Italian". As with many of its European competitors, the five-door was less sporty than the coupé-like three-door bodystyle, with a higher roofline and a more upright appearance overall.

Critics also attacked the car's excessive weight and its semi-independent rear torsion beam suspension / twist-beam rear suspension, however, this was the same system used by the market-leading Volkswagen Golf of the time. Some saw the torsion beam as a step backwards from the acclaimed fully-independent rear suspension used in the Bravo/Brava and Fiat Coupé. The Stilo was the second car worldwide to use the TRW Column-Drive Electric Power-Assisted Steering (EPS) technology after the second generation Fiat Punto, later introduced on the 2003 Nissan Micra and Renault Mégane. As the model range aged, the range of available options was reduced.

However, when pushed the Stilo resists understeer, although arguably its soft spring and damper rate dull the experience. The engine range, particularly the 1.2-litre petrol, was also generally criticised for being underpowered. However, the 1.6 version is the last iteration of the old Fiat 128 SOHC engine which provided strong performance.

The car's fuel economy was also seen as poor for its class, a result of the car's weight. Another point of criticism was the Selespeed gearbox fitted to the Abarth version: this was seen as too slow in its reactions and particularly inappropriate for this high powered version. Nevertheless, the car won praise for its high levels of grip (aided by the unusually wide tires) and its brakes.

In the United Kingdom, different trim levels available were: Active, Active Aircon, Blue, Dynamic, Sporting, Abarth, GT, Prestigio, Xbox limited edition, Michael Schumacher, and the Schumacher GP, with general modifications by British car specialists, Prodrive.

The Stilo was originally offered in some markets with a radar assisted cruise control option; it included sensors in the front bumper and rear of the car to adjust the speed of the car according to other vehicles' speed. This was soon dropped as it became apparent that interference was creating undesired results.

A keyless entry, named 'Easy Go', push-button start, similar in function to Citroën's, Mercedes-Benz's and BMW Mini's systems, was also an available option. For MY2006 in September 2005, the Stilo was updated with a new front grille, different seat fabric, a relocation of the electric mirror controls from the window control console to just behind the gear stick.

The entry models also had the centre armrest removed (which when in the downward position prevented comfortable use of the handbrake as in the Audi A3) and the deletion of the rear air vent.

The Stilo was ultimately a sales disappointment. An extensive advertising campaign using Formula 1 star Michael Schumacher and Rubens Barrichello did little to aid the car's sales. In October 2013, The Economist placed the Stilo into the report on Europe's Biggest Loss Making Cars.

In 2004, the Stilo received a light facelift. The 1242 cc engine was dropped in favour of the Punto's 1.4-litre unit, increasing the car's power to 95 PS (70 kW; 94 hp), again combined with the six-speed gearbox. Also, the taillights were altered, and the Abarth version gained a traditional manual gearbox, instead of the Selespeed.

=== Specifications ===
Capacity	1242–2446 cc
Power	80–170 PS (59–125 kW; 79–168 hp)
Max. speed	170–225 km/h (106–140 mph)
Acceleration	0–100 km/h (0–62 mph): 13.8–8.5 seconds

The original engine and gearbox combinations were:

- 1242 cc DOHC sixteen valve engine that also powered the Punto and Lancia Ypsilon, with an output of 80 PS (59 kW; 79 hp) combined with a six-speed manual gearbox
- 103 PS (76 kW; 102 hp) 1.6 L with a five-speed manual gearbox (also offered with a six-speed manual gearbox)
- 133 PS (98 kW; 131 hp) 1.8 L, again with a five-speed manual gearbox
- 170 PS (125 kW; 168 hp) five cylinder, 2.4 L engine, combined with Fiat's Selespeed five-speed automated manual gearbox, similar to the gearbox used on the Alfa Romeo 147 and Alfa Romeo 156
- 1.9 JTD unit with 80 PS (59 kW; 79 hp) or 115 PS (85 kW; 113 hp)
- 8 valve, 1.9 MultiJet with 101 PS (74 kW; 100 hp) or 120 PS (88 kW; 118 hp)
- 16 valve 1.9 MultiJet with 140 PS (103 kW; 138 hp) or 150 PS (110 kW; 148 hp)

== Safety ==
The Fiat Stilo passed the Euro NCAP car safety tests, with following ratings:

Euro NCAP test results* Fiat Stilo (2008)
Test	Score	Rating
Adult occupant:	27	4 /5 stars
Child occupant:	37	4 /5 stars
Pedestrian:	8	1 /4 stars

== Motorsport ==
A Group N version of the car was developed by Abarth to compete in the single-make trophy called Trofeo Stilo Abarth, held in Italy from 2002 to 2005. The car was revealed in November 2001, at the Bologna Motor Show.

It was derived from the Stilo 1.8 16v version, with the engine power increased from 133 bhp (99 kW; 135 PS) to 157 bhp (117 kW; 159 PS), and from the season of 2003 to 180 bhp (134 kW; 182 PS). A similar competition was held in the United Kingdom from 2004 to 2005, called the Fiat Stilo Rally Cup.

In September 2004, a junior team backed up by Fiat UK competed in the Wales Rally GB of the World Rally Championship with group A cars, and the following year two other cars took part in the rally. Stilo cars have also been present in the Andros Trophy during the last years.

== Marketing ==
=== South America ===
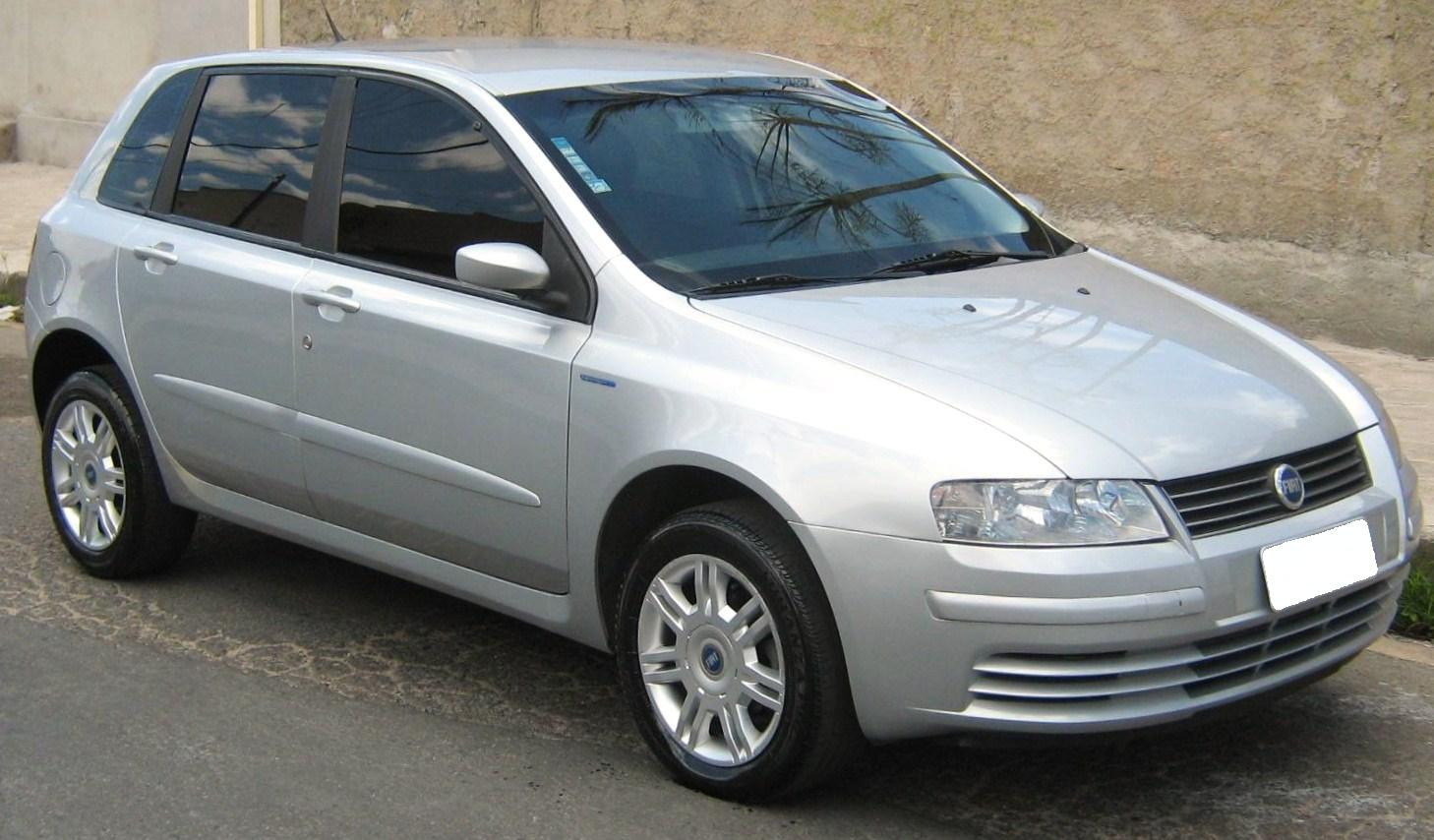
Brazilian-built Fiat Stilo (five door)

Only available in the five-door hatchback version, the Stilo was launched in South America in 2003, being assembled in Brazil. The engines were the Family I GM engines 1.8 L with eight valves and 103 PS (76 kW; 102 hp) or 16 valves and 122 PS (90 kW; 120 hp), and a 2.4-litre, twenty valve five-cylinder version with 170 PS (125 kW; 168 hp) for the Abarth model as well.

For export, the chosen engines were the Italian made 1.8 16v VIS engine with 133 PS (98 kW; 131 hp) and the 1.9 JTD Diesel of 115 PS (85 kW; 113 hp) specially for Argentina, Uruguay and Chile. Chile did not get the JTD, but was the only country in the region to receive the Italian-made three-door and Multi Wagon versions. Diesel cars were not legally available to Brazilian private car buyers.

A Schumacher special edition of the Stilo was added in 2004 and lasted until 2006; contrary to the European version, which was based on the three-door version and equipped with the 2.4 twenty valve engine, the Brazilian was only available with five doors and the Family I GM 1.8 16v engine with 122 PS (90 kW; 120 hp).

In 2006, the Stilo gained a GM sourced flexible engine capable of using petrol and ethanol (1.8 8v with 110 PS (81 kW; 108 hp) on petrol and 114 PS (84 kW; 112 hp) with ethanol) and the 1.8 16v engine was retired. In the Americas, the Stilo was partially replaced by the new Bravo at the end of 2010, when it will be built in Brazil; from 2007 on the Italian import is available in Chile and Venezuela.

Fiat Automóveis introduced a facelifted Stilo in the end of January 2008, in which the Dualogic automated manual gearbox was released, being available to every version with the 1.8 8v Flex engine, which now produces 112 PS (82 kW; 110 hp) (petrol) or 114 PS (84 kW; 112 hp) when using ethanol as fuel. The car also got minor cosmetic changes to front grille, bonnet, side bumpers and to the taillights, in order to end its production cycle, which is expected to happen in 2010.

For the MY2009, Fiat withdrew the Abarth version from the market in Brazil; the version wasn't available in other markets anymore. For the MY2010, Fiat do Brasil launched a "basic features" version called Attractive, still with the 1.8 8v Flex engine. This version marks the confirmation that the new Bravo is coming, with the low-cost Stilo Attractive as the only version.

In March 2010, Brazil's Justice Ministry fined Fiat three million Reais (US$1.7 million) for failing to recall its Stilo without ABS brakes to fix a rear wheel problem that may have caused thirty accidents and eight deaths. Fiat denied any wrongdoing, saying that the rear wheel problem was not the cause of the accidents, but rather caused by them.

== Sales and production ==
769,000 Stilo were produced, including 102,662 in Brazil.

The Stilo has been a big failure for Fiat, as the company expected to reach production to 400,000 annual units.

Overall, due to insufficient sales, Fiat lost an estimated €2,730 per vehicle produced.

== Sales ==
Year	Brazil
2002	5,104
2003	14,921
2004	10,137
2005	10,054
2006	10,467
2007	13,062
2008	16,327
2009	11,273
2010	6,544
2011	227
