= Maria =

Maria may refer to:

== People ==
- Maria (given name), a popular given name in many languages
- Moria people, also spelled Maria, Muslim community in Assam, India

== Place names ==
=== Extraterrestrial ===
- 170 Maria, a Main belt S-type asteroid discovered in 1877
- Lunar maria (plural of mare), large, dark basaltic plains on Earth's Moon

=== Terrestrial ===
- Maria, Maevatanana, Madagascar
- Maria, Quebec, Canada
- Maria, Siquijor, the Philippines
- María, Spain, in Andalusia
- Îles Maria, French Polynesia
- María de Huerva, Aragon, Spain
- Villa Maria (disambiguation)

== Arts, entertainment, and media ==
=== Films ===
- Maria (1947 film), Swedish film
- Maria (1975 film), Swedish film
- Maria (2003 film), Romanian film
- Maria (2019 film), Filipino film
- Maria (2021 film), Canadian film directed by Alec Pronovost
- Maria (2022 film), Sri Lankan film
- Being Maria, 2024 French film released as Maria in France
- Maria (2024 film), American film

=== Literature ===
- María (novel), an 1867 novel by Jorge Isaacs
- Maria (Ukrainian novel), a 1934 novel by the Ukrainian writer Ulas Samchuk
- Maria (play), a 1935 play by Isaac Babel
- Maria, a poetic novel (1825) by Antoni Malczewski
- Maria: or, The Wrongs of Woman, a 1798 unfinished novel by Mary Wollstonecraft
- Maria (Philippine fairy tale)

=== Music ===
==== Artists ====
- Maria (band), a Japanese all-female band
- Maria (Danish singer), born 1978
- Maria (South African singer), 1945–1980
- Maria (Bulgarian singer), born 1982
- Maria (Bruneian singer), born 1989

==== Albums ====
- Maria (Jane Siberry album), 1995
- Maria (Carminho album), 2018
- María (EP), a 2020 EP by Hwasa

==== Songs ====
- "María" (Cátulo Castillo song), 1945
- "Maria" (West Side Story song), from the musical West Side Story by Sondheim, Bernstein 1956, covered by Gene Pitney, The Delta Rhythm Boys, P. J. Proby and others
- "Maria" (Rodgers and Hammerstein song), from the musical The Sound of Music 1959
- "María" (Franco song), 1988
- "María" (Ricky Martin song), by Ricky Martin, 1995
- "Maria" (Blondie song), 1999
- "María" (Östen med Resten song), 2003
- "Maria" (US5 song), 2005
- María (Hwasa song), 2020
- "Maria (I Like It Loud)", by Scooter, a cover of "I Like It Loud" by Marc Acardipane
- "Maria", by Animal Liberation Orchestra from Roses & Clover
- "María", by Café Tacuba from Café Tacuba
- "Maria", song by David Sylvian from the album Secrets of the Beehive
- "Maria", a song by Dua Lipa from the album Radical Optimism, 2024
- "Maria", by Gackt from Rebirth
- "Maria", a song by Lorna Cordeiro with Mohammad Rafi
- "Maria", by Green Day from International Superhits!
- "Maria", by Guano Apes from Proud Like a God
- "Maria", by The Jacksons from 2300 Jackson Street
- "Maria", by Jean Ferrat
- "Maria", by Joe Dassin
- "Maria", by Justin Bieber from Believe
- "Maria", by Kendji Girac
- "Maria", by Kim Ah-joong from the Korean film 200 Pounds Beauty
- "Maria", by Men at Work from Two Hearts
- "María", by Pepe Aguilar from No Lo Había Dicho
- "Maria", by Six Organs of Admittance from their self-titled album
- "Maria", by Rage Against the Machine from The Battle of Los Angeles
- "Maria", by Redgum from the album Virgin Ground
- "Maria", by Robert Earl Keen from West Textures
- "Maria", by Wu-Tang Clan from Wu-Tang Forever
- "Oh Maria", by Louis Prima from The Wildest!
- "O Marie", by Eduardo di Capua
- "Maria (You Were the Only One)", by Michael Jackson from Got to Be There
- "They Call the Wind Maria", a song from the musical Paint Your Wagon

=== Operas ===
- Maria, a 1903-4 opera by Roman Statkowski (based on the poetic novel by Antoni Malczewski)

=== Paintings ===
- Maria (painting), an 1836 painting by Charles Landseer

=== Television ===
- Maria (TV series), Kenyan drama series

== Computing and technology ==
- Maria (storage engine), a storage engine for MySQL (renamed Aria in 2010)
- Maria reactor, a nuclear research reactor in Poland
- MARIA XML, a model-based XML language for User Interfaces
- MariaDB, a community-developed branch of the MySQL database

== Languages ==
- Maria language (disambiguation)
  - Maria language (India) (also Madiya), Dravidian language of the Gondi group
  - Maria language (Papua New Guinea)

== Ships ==
- Maria (brigantine), Australian shipwreck of 1840, whose survivors were massacred
- SS Maria, a number of ships with this name
- SS Maria Dan, a Danish cargo ship in service 1946–59
- SS Maria M. (1891) a Greek cargo ship in service 1930–31

== Other uses ==
- Hotel Maria, a hotel in Helsinki, Finland
- Maria 2.0, movement of Roman Catholic women
- Marie biscuit, a type of sweet biscuit similar to a Rich Tea biscuit
- Tropical Storm Maria (disambiguation), one of several named storms
  - Most notably Hurricane Maria (2017)

== See also ==
- Santa Maria (disambiguation)
- Black Maria (disambiguation)
- Ave Maria (disambiguation)
- Mario (disambiguation)
- Marius (disambiguation)
- Mariah (disambiguation)
- Marie (disambiguation)
- Muria (disambiguation)
- Mariya
- Mary (given name)
- Marea (disambiguation)
- O Maria, a 2010 Indian film
- "O Maria", a song by R. D. Burman, Asha Bhosle and S. P. Balasubrahmanyam from the 1985 Indian film Saagar
