= Fiat Fiasa engine =

Fiasa (Fiat Automóveis S.A.) engine
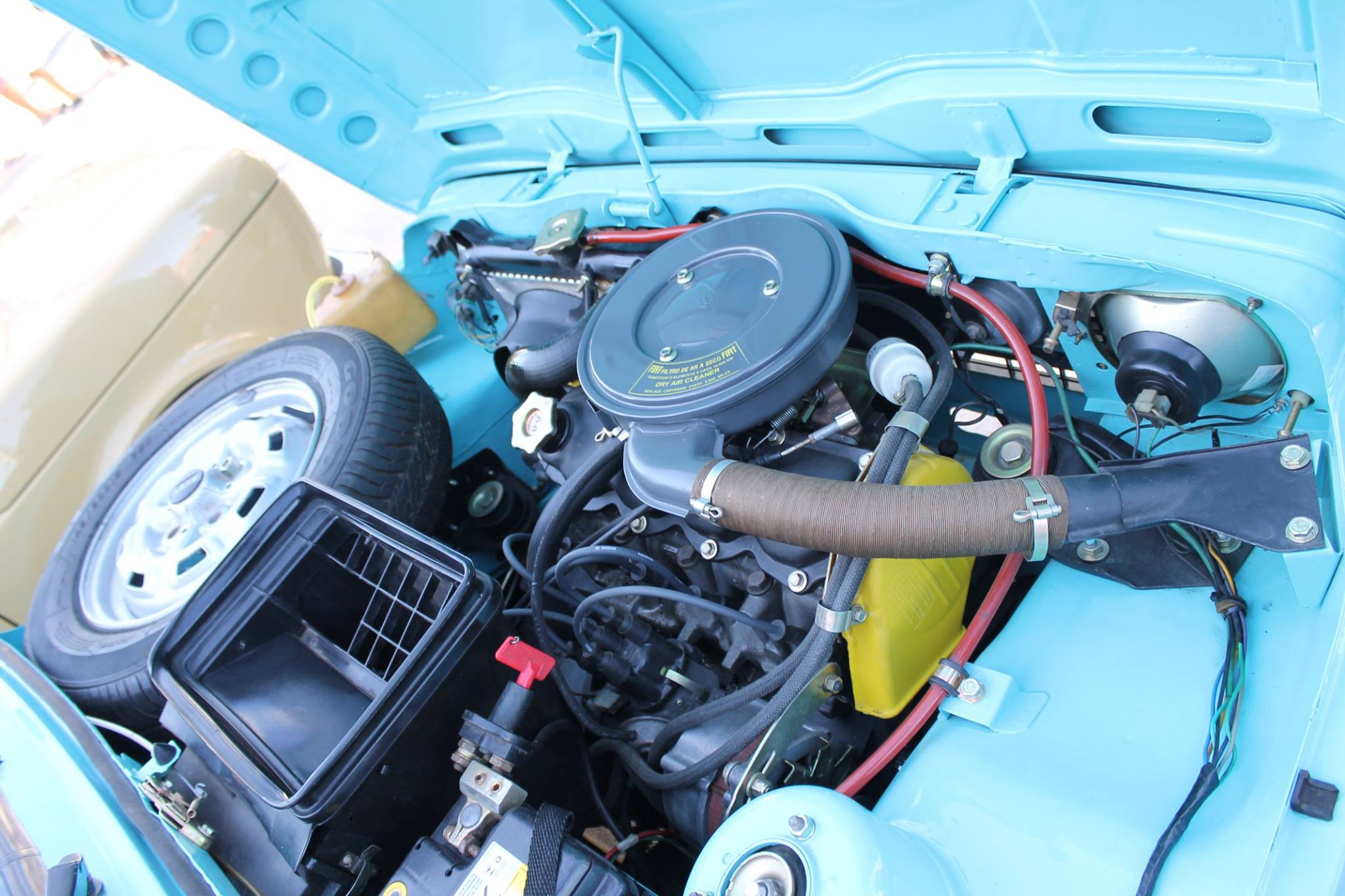
- 1049cc FIASA engine in a Fiat 147

Overview
- Manufacturer: Fiat Automóveis (Brazil)
- Production: 1976–2001

Layout
- Configuration: Inline-four
- Displacement: 1.0 L (994 cc); 1.05 L (1,049 cc); 1.12 L (1,116 cc); 1.3 L (1,297 cc); 1.3 L (1,301 cc); 1.4 L (1,415 cc); 1.5 L (1,497 cc)
- Cylinder bore: 76.0 mm (2.99 in); 76.1 mm (3.00 in)
- Piston stroke: 54.8 mm (2.16 in); 57.8 mm (2.28 in); 61.5 mm (2.42 in); 71.5 mm (2.81 in); 78.0 mm (3.07 in); 79.2 mm (3.12 in); 82.5 mm (3.25 in)
- Cylinder block material: Cast iron
- Cylinder head material: Aluminium
- Valvetrain: SOHC 2 valve x cyl.

Combustion
- Fuel system: Carburetor, Indirect injection
- Fuel type: Gasoline, Ethanol, Diesel
- Cooling system: Water-cooled

Fiasa is a car engine produced by Italian manufacturer Fiat. Designed by Aurelio Lampredi, the name Fiasa is a portmanteau of "Fiat Automóveis S.A.", for whom it was developed. It first appeared in the Brazilian-built Fiat 147 in September 1976, and shortly afterwards in the 'Series 2' version of the Fiat 127. The in-line four-cylinder engine has five main bearings, a cast iron block with an aluminium cylinder-head with belt-driven overhead camshafts actuating the valves. The engine remained in production until 2001 in Latin America, and also provided the basis for a diesel version (never sold in Brazil, where it was built, as that country did not allow diesel passenger cars).

The capacity was initially 1.0 L (1,049 cc), but Lampredi designed the engine to be suited for a considerably longer stroke. Sizes eventually ranged between 1.0 and 1.5 L (994 and 1,497 cc). The last versions of this engine to be built was a 1.5-litre, dedicated-ethanol version developed in Brazil that served the Fiat Uno and its derivatives, and later yet the Fiat Palio (both the hatch and the Weekend) until 2001.

== Engine specifications ==
The Fiasa engine was produced in a number of stroke lengths but always of nearly the same bore. The first model was very oversquare, using a bore and a stroke of 76 mm × 57.8 mm (2.99 in × 2.28 in) to produce a displacement of 1049 cc. The rod length was an ample 130 mm (5.1 in), meaning that much larger strokes were possible without any negative consequences. The engine was designed to provide good low-down torque and fuel economy, but not for high peak power, and the compression ratio was a very low 7.2:1 to deal with the low octane petrol commonly available in Brazil at the time. It had a single-barrel carburetor and the intake manifolds were narrow, restricting peak power while providing good performance at lower engine speeds. It had breakerless electronic ignition and chrome-treated exhaust valves with stellite seats, for increased durability. A larger 1.3 L (1,297 cc) version arrived in 1979, again tuned for low down torque. This has a 71.5 mm (2.81 in) stroke. This larger engine was also available in a sportier version with twin-barrel Webers (imported from Italy) and more power. A third version of the 1.3 was Fiat's and the world's first modern ethanol-powered engine. As exports to Europe commenced, the 1.3 was later bored out by 0.1 mm, to nudge the displacement above 1.3 liters. This allowed Italian motorists to drive a full 140 km/h (87 mph) on the autostrada, rather than the 130 km/h (81 mph) to which cars under 1.3 litres were limited. The diesel derivative was also of this dimension.

The Brazilian engines were also exported to Europe in large numbers, both for the 127, Ritmo, and the later Uno. The fully finished engines were shipped in large containers containing 144 engines each. The 1.05 was also installed in the Autobianchi Y10, where it was also available with turbocharging.

Fiat later made a very short-lived 1.4 L (1,415 cc) derivative, using a 78.0 mm (3.07 in) stroke. This was only installed in the sporty Fiat Oggi CSS, which was built in 300 examples in 1984. This engine produces 78 PS (57 kW). The next version was an undersquare version with a much longer stroke, the 1.5 L (1,497 cc) version with a 82.5 mm (3.25 in) which was introduced for the Fiat Fiorino in 1989. The little 1050 was discontinued in 1989 as well. The final iteration was developed to fit Brazil's new sub-1 liter tax category and was introduced in 1990. Displacing 1.0 L (994 cc), it had an extremely short stroke of 54.8 mm (2.16 in). With a single carburetor, the new engine's specifications were very similar to the 1.05. A higher-powered, twin-barrel ethanol-powered version was introduced in 1991 for the Uno Brio but was discontinued shortly thereafter as it could not meet the new emissions regulations which took effect in January 1992. With these, only the single-barrel 1.0 (now catalyzed) and the 1.5 remained available.

The catalyzed 1.0 was not cost effective, and for 1993 Fiat switched to an electronically controlled, double-barrel Weber 495 carburetor and was able to forego the catalyst. The new "Mille Electronic" cost less to build and power was higher than before the new emissions impositions. However, the production cars appear not to have met the 1992 standards and in November 1995 Fiat was fined R$ 3.93 million ($8,880,000 in 2025 dollars) for the 429,928 non-conforming Mille Electronic/ELX sold between December 1992 to June 1995.

Valid engine bore/stroke combinations

Stroke (mm)	Bore (mm)		
Stroke (mm)	76	76.1	
54.8	994	997	Capacity (cc)
57.8	1049	1052	Capacity (cc)
61.5	1116	1119	Capacity (cc)
71.5	1297	1301	Capacity (cc)
78.0	1415	1419	Capacity (cc)
82.5	1497	1501	Capacity (cc)
71.5	1297	1301	Capacity (cc)

Key
gasoline
diesel

Some (possible) engine capacities are equal to those of the Fiat OHC engines, OHV engines and DOHC engines built in Italy, but these are not the same engines.

== Applications ==
List of vehicles using variations of the Fiasa engine (incomplete):

Petrol engine

- Fiat 147/Spazio: 1976–1987
- Fiat 127 Series 2/3: 1977-1987 (export version for Europe)
- Fiat Fiorino: 1979-2000
- Fiat Panorama: 1980–1986
- Fiat Oggi: 1983–1985
- Fiat Uno/Mille: 1984-2001 (Latin American version)
- Fiat Prêmio/Duna/Elba: 1985–1999
- Fiat Ritmo/Strada: 1978-1988
- Innocenti Mille: 1994–1997
- Fiat Palio: 1996–2001
- Autobianchi/Lancia Y10: 1985–1995

Diesel engine

- Fiat 127: 1981-1987 (export version for Europe)
- Fiat 147/148/Spazio: 1981–1990
- Fiat Panorama (export version for Europe)
- Fiat Uno: 1983-1989 (Europe)
- Fiat Panda: 1986-1989 (until 1994 in the Panda Van)
- Fiat Fiorino: 1981-1987
