= Fiat Oggi =

Subcompact car produced in South America by Fiat

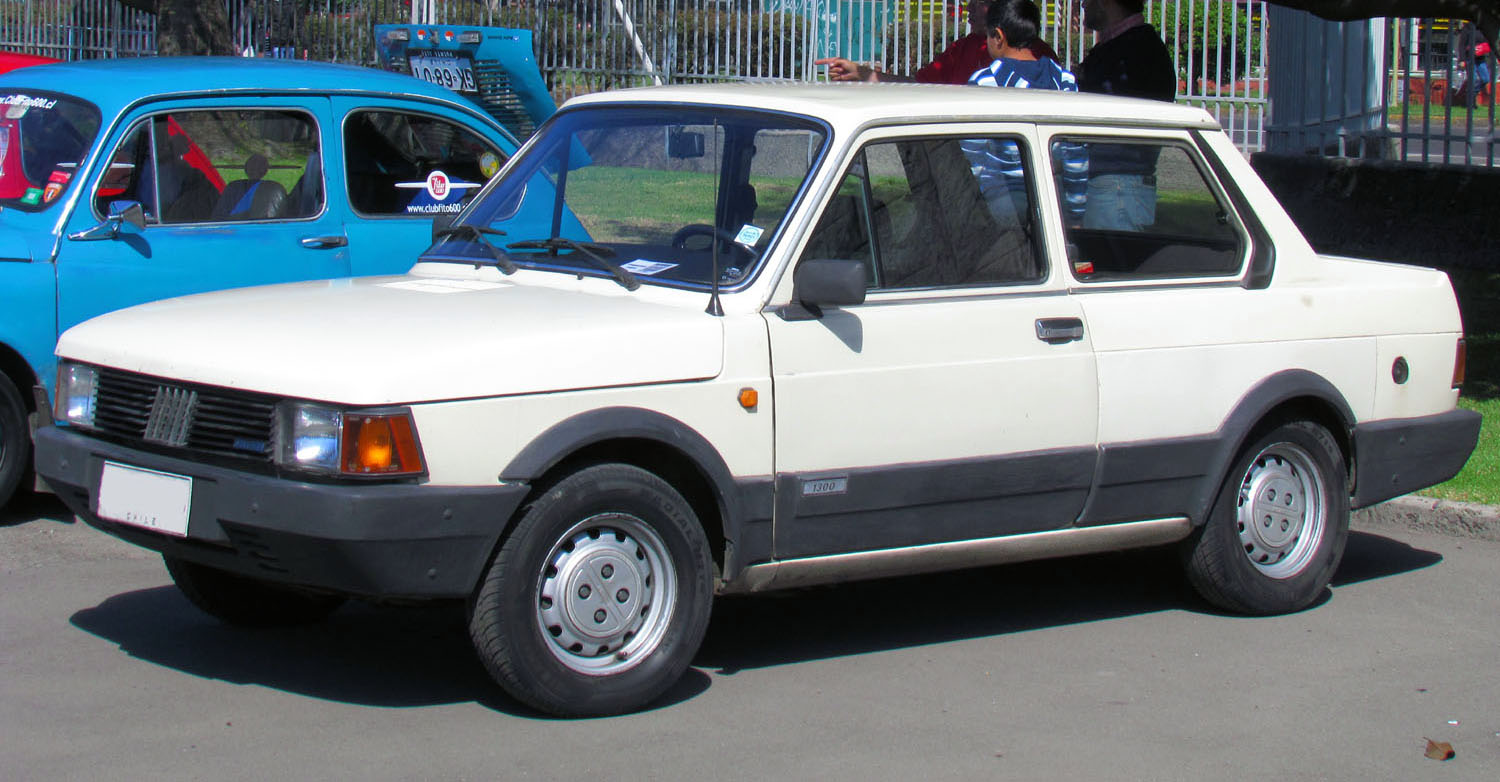

Overview
- Manufacturer: Fiat
- Production: 1983–1985
- Assembly: Brazil: Betim

Body and chassis
- Class: Supermini (B)
- Body style: 2-door sedan
- Layout: FF layout
- Related: Fiat 147; Fiat Panorama; Fiat 127

Powertrain
- Engine: 1,297 cc I4; 1,415 cc I4
- Transmission: 4 or 5-speed manual

Dimensions
- Wheelbase: 2,220 mm (87.4 in)
- Length: 3,970 mm (156.3 in)
- Width: 1,570 mm (61.8 in)
- Height: 1,340 mm (52.8 in)
- Curb weight: 820 kg (1,808 lb)

Chronology
- Successor: Fiat Duna

The Fiat Oggi (named after "today" in Italian) is a two-door sedan based on the Fiat 147, a subcompact car produced in South America by Italian automaker Fiat. The Oggi was produced in Brazil from 1983 until 1985, when it was replaced by the Uno-based Prêmio. This car was a response to the new sedans in the Brazilian market, the Chevrolet Monza, the Volkswagen Voyage and later the Ford Escort.

The Oggi featured a very big trunk for a car only 3,966 mm (156 in) long. According to Quatro Rodas magazine of 05/1983 the volume of the trunk was 440 liters, the second largest in Brazil. The biggest was the Monza's: 448 liters, but the Monza was a mid-size car with an overall length of 4,366 mm (172 in).

The Oggi was mainly sold with one engine option, the 1.3 L (1,297 cc) Fiat Fiasa engine, equipped to run on either alcohol or gasoline. The gasoline engine had a power of 60 PS (44 kW) and the alcohol engine, the most common, 61 PS (45 kW) of power. The gasohol versions output was reduced to 55 PS (40 kW) in 1984 for a lower fuel consumption. The CS version was added in January 1984. In 1984 and 1985 there was also a special version named CSS with a 1.4 L (1,415 cc) engine. This was also used in a Brazilian race championship and was limited to about 300 units sold. Overall, 20,419 Oggis were sold in Brazil over its three-year career.

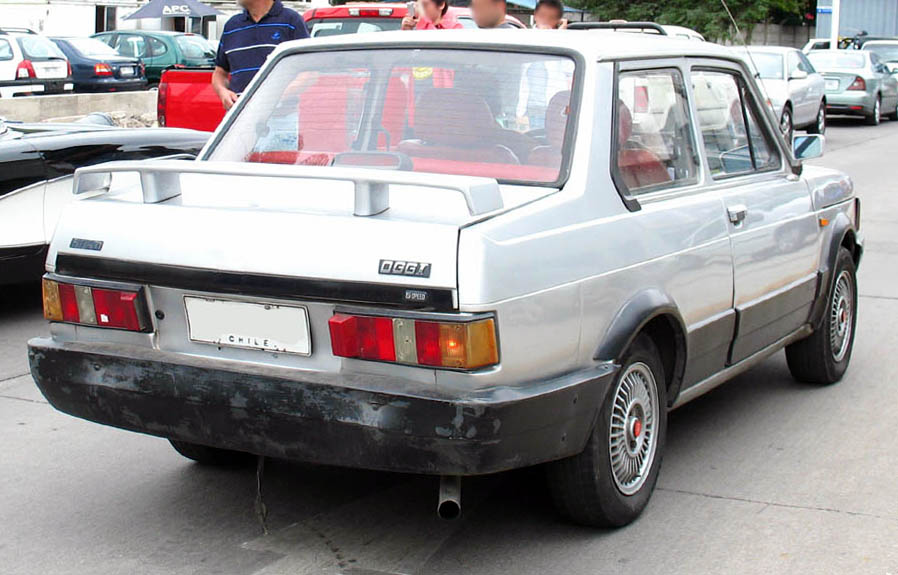
1984 Oggi 1300
