= Fiat Bravo and Brava =

Hatchback car models

Fiat Bravo Fiat Brava
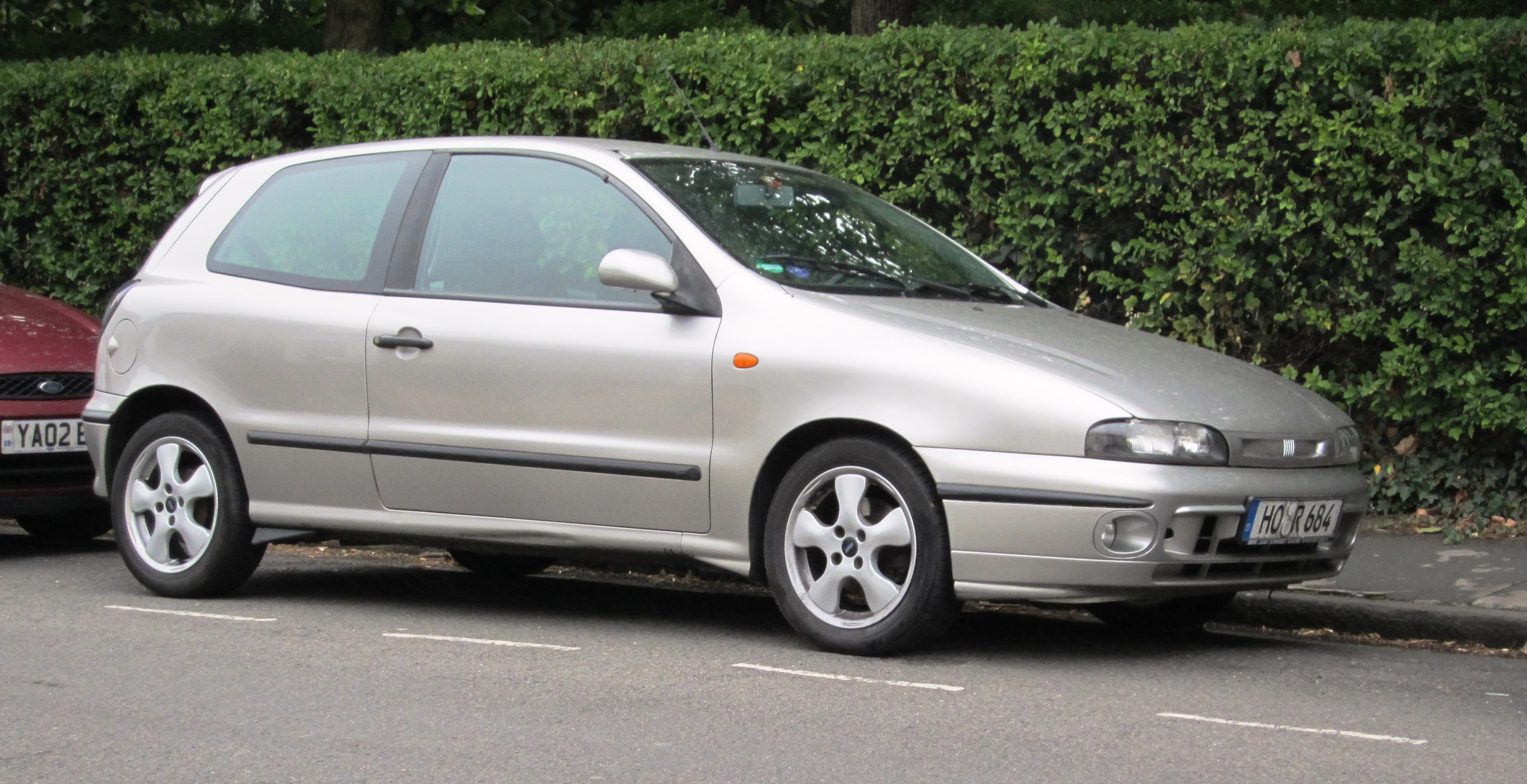
- Fiat Bravo

Overview
- Manufacturer: Fiat
- Also called: Fiat Bravissimo (Japan)
- Production: 1995–2001 (Europe); 1999–2003 (Brazil)
- Assembly: Italy: Cassino Plant, Piedimonte San Germano, Lazio; Italy: Rivalta; Brazil: Betim, Minas Gerais (Brava only); Turkey: Bursa (Tofaş: Brava only); Poland: Tychy (Fiat Auto Poland)
- Designer: Centro Stile Fiat (1992): Peter Fassbender (Bravo); Mauro Basso (Brava)

Body and chassis
- Class: Small family car (C)
- Body style: 3-door hatchback (Bravo); 5-door fastback (Brava)
- Layout: FF layout
- Platform: Fiat C1
- Related: Fiat Marea; Fiat Multipla; Alfa Romeo 147; Alfa Romeo 156; Alfa Romeo GT; Lancia Lybra

Powertrain
- Engine: petrol: 1.25 L Fire 16V I4; 1.4 L Pratola Serra 12V I4; 1.6 L Torque 16V I4; 1.8 L Pratola Serra 16V I4; 2.0 L Pratola Serra 20V I5; diesel: 1.9 L 160A.7 I4; 1.9 L Pratola Serra turbo I4; 1.9 L JTD common rail turbo I4
- Transmission: 5-speed manual; 4-speed automatic

Dimensions
- Wheelbase: 2,540 mm (100.0 in)
- Length: 4,020 mm (158.3 in) (Bravo); 4,190 mm (165.0 in) (Brava)
- Width: 1,750 mm (68.9 in)
- Height: 1,420 mm (55.9 in)
- Curb weight: 1,010–1,190 kg (2,226.7–2,623.5 lb)

Chronology
- Predecessor: Fiat Tipo
- Successor: Fiat Stilo

The Fiat Bravo and Fiat Brava (Type 182) are small family cars produced by the Italian automaker Fiat from 1995 to 2003 (2001 in Europe). They were effectively two versions of the same car: the Bravo, a three-door hatchback, and the Brava, a five-door fastback. The Bravo name was revived in January 2007, with the all-new Fiat Bravo, a replacement for the Stilo. The new version was available only with five doors.

The name Brava was also used in the United States in the 1980s, on the earlier Fiat 131.

== History ==
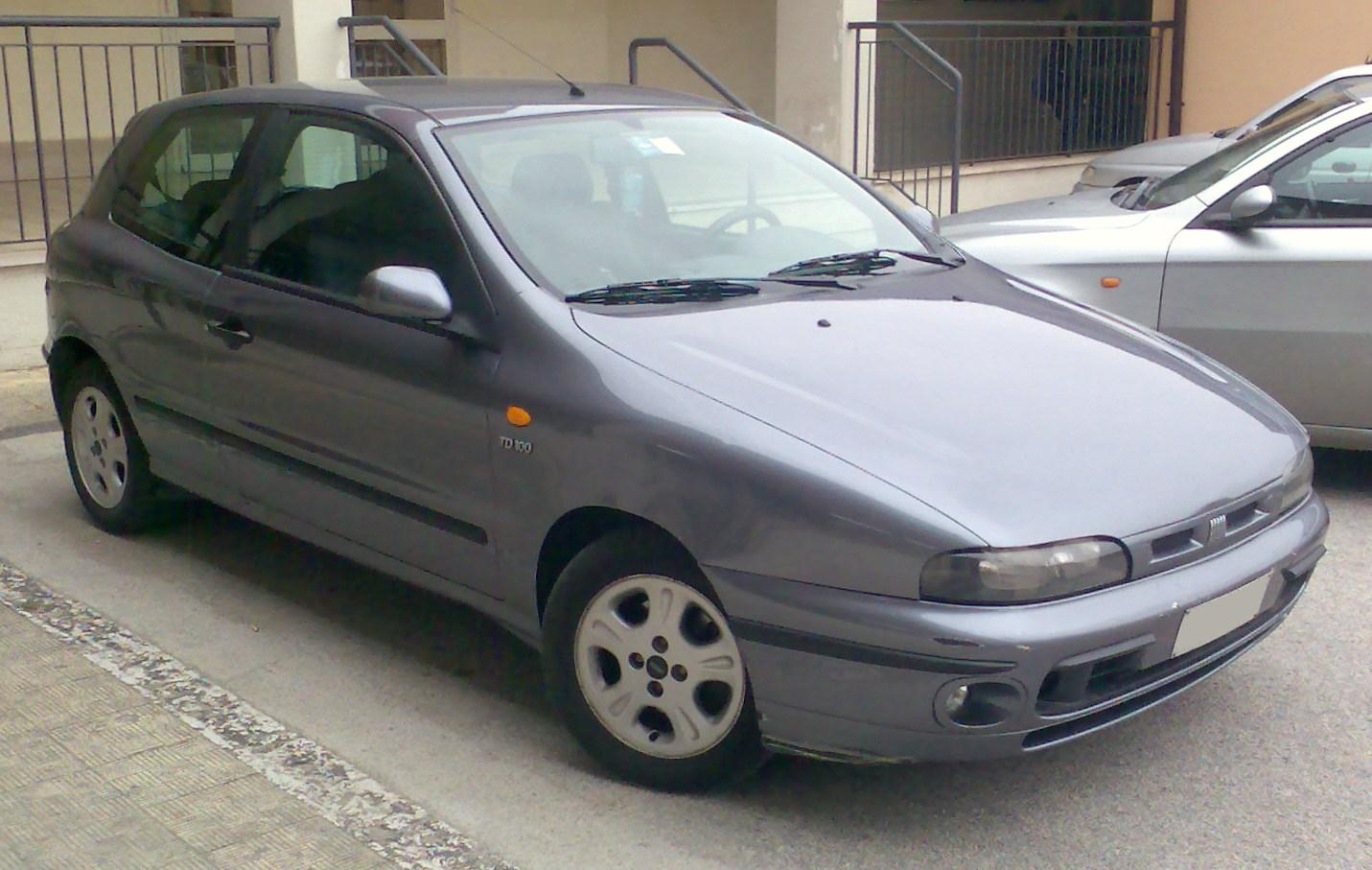
3 door Fiat Bravo

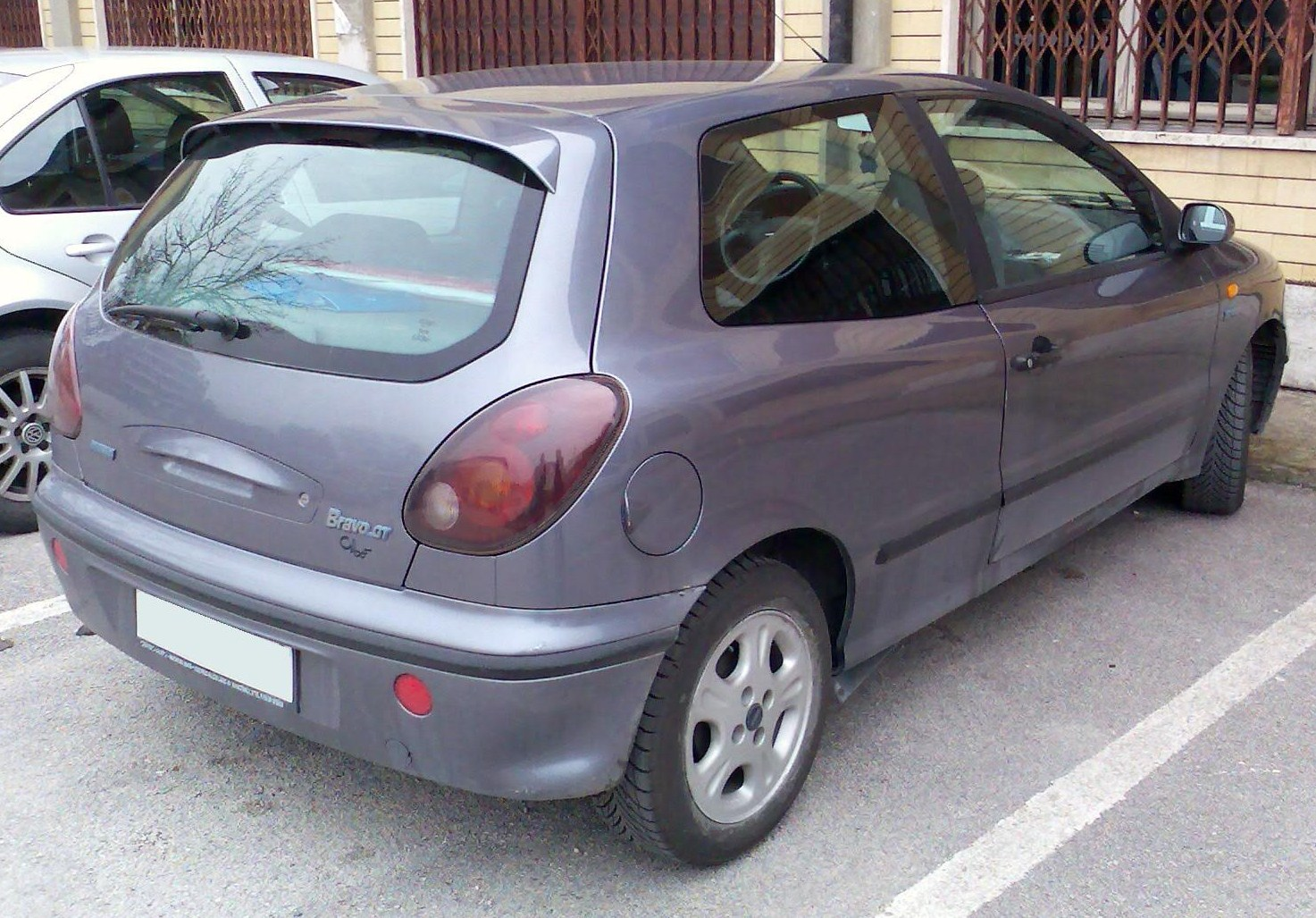
3 door Fiat Bravo

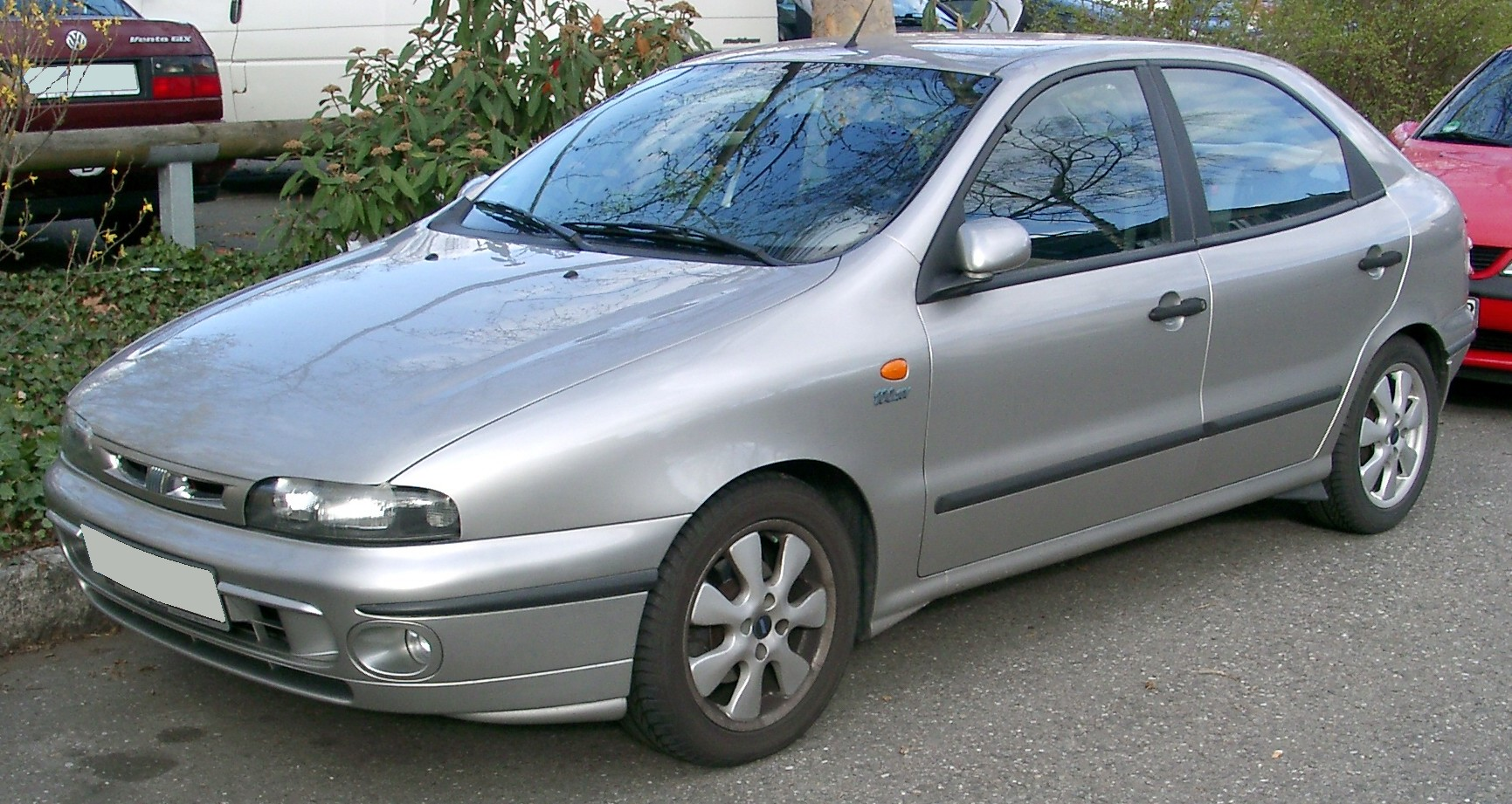
5 door Fiat Brava

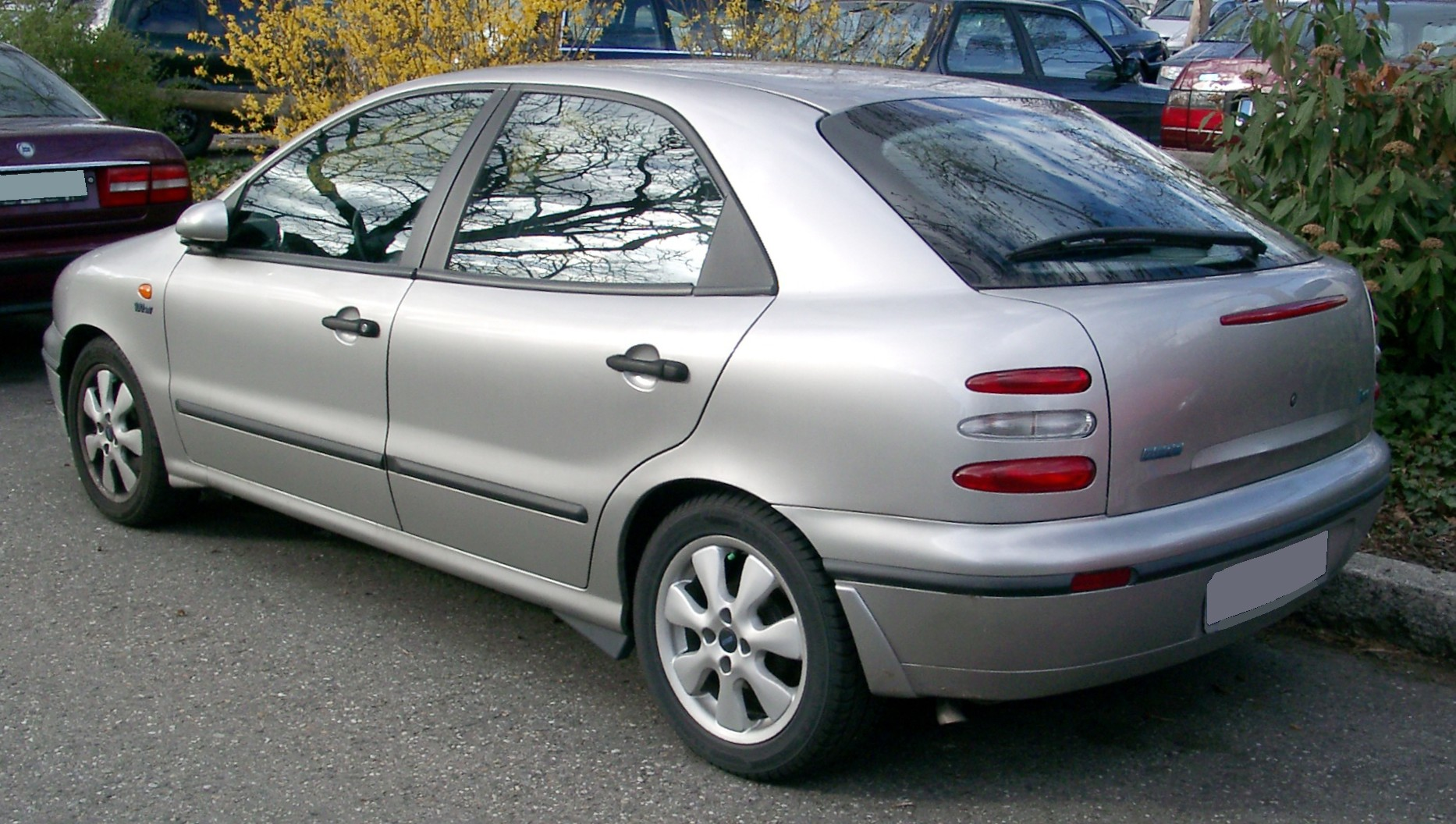
5 door Fiat Brava rear

The Bravo and the Brava were replacements for Fiat's successful but ageing Tipo model. The two cars were very different in styling detail and driving experience, the Bravo chassis being tuned for more precise handling, whilst the Brava was tuned for better comfort. The interior trim and many of the body colours were unique to either one version or the other. Both cars had a two-star safety rating on Euro NCAP. The cars came with all-new engines, the base model using a 1.4 L 12-valve engine producing 80 PS (59 kW). Three other petrol engines were available: the 103 PS (76 kW) 1.6 L 16 valve; the 113 PS (83 kW) 1.8 L 16-valve engine and the top-of-the-range 2.0 L 20-valve inline five unit used in the HGT model, which produced 147 PS (108 kW) and which could take the car to a maximum speed of 213 km/h (132 mph). In 1999, the 155 HGT model replaced the older model, offering greater power of 155 PS (114 kW).

Two turbodiesel engines were also available: both were 1.9 L four-cylinder units, one producing 75 PS (55 kW) and the other making 100 PS (74 kW). The Bravo/Brava was voted European Car of the Year on its launch.

The Bravo/Brava chassis spawned saloon and estate versions in 1996, which were badged as the Fiat Marea, a car which aimed at Ford Mondeo and Opel/Vauxhall Vectra buyers, which won praise for its large boot.

Another car based on the Bravo/Brava underpinnings, the Fiat Multipla, was launched in 1998, which was a six-seater compact MPV. In 1999, the Bravo/Brava received a mild makeover. It was discontinued in 2001, being replaced by the Fiat Stilo.

The cars were advertised as being silent, futuristic, economical and offering "The Choice". Fiat's Italian adverts said "Fiat Bravo. Fiat Brava. La Scelta", which roughly translates as "Fiat Bravo. Fiat Brava. The Choice", hinting at the fact that they 'were very similar cars but with the option of a sporty three-door hatchback or a practical five-door fastback.

Peter Davis, Fiat's Styling Center director at the time, said that they started working on the Bravo and Brava immediately after they had finished working on the Coupe and the Barchetta. He said they wanted to push the design to the limit, break the rules and discover every angle of the car, distinguishing it from the competitors.

Jeremy Clarkson reviewed the Fiat Bravo and Brava in 1995 on Top Gear, stating that "This is how an ordinary car can look like, if you put a bit of effort into it". He also stated : "I'm in a three-door hatchback, which you can buy for less than £10,000, and I'm having fun, and it's only got a 1.4-litre engine! A good-looking car that's nice to drive and cheap to run too." Clarkson also said that the car felt rigid, there were no squeaks or rattles, and all the switches inside had a quality feel.

== Facelift ==
The Bravo/Brava received a mild facelift in 1999.

The 1.4L 12v engine was dropped in favour of the 1.2 16v unit from the Fiat Punto, the 2.0L 20V engine of the HGT model gained VVT and VIS systems upping the power from 147 PS (108 kW) to 155 PS (114 kW), the dashboard was redesigned and improved across all trim levels, the grilles of the cars were redesigned, the A/C unit was swapped with the automatic one from the Fiat Coupé, and other small details about the cars were changed throughout the range of trims.

The 1.9 turbodiesel was phased out in favour of 1.9 JTD diesel units (now with and 105 PS or 77 kW), to give even better economy and refinement. In the Greek market, all later model Bravas received the rear deck spoiler as standard.

== Special editions ==
- Anniversaire: introduced in 1997 for both cars, with only 1,100 pieces, celebrating Fiat's win of Car of the Year 1996 for the Bravo/Brava duo, for the market in Western Europe. It was a 1.6 16v Sx version, with metallic paint, electrically adjustable and heated mirrors, fog lights, front passenger airbag, ABS and a CD player instead of the Tape player.
- Evening Vale: introduced in March 2000 for the Brava for the Western Europe market. It was a 1.2 16V/1.6 16V/1.9 JTD SX version, with special 14" wheel trims and automatic A/C.
- Formula: introduced in 2001, for the Bravo, for the United Kingdom. It was a 1.2 16V SX version with the GT Trim's 15" wheels, GT's rear spoiler, electrically adjustable and heated mirrors, fog lights, CD Player and remote central locking.
- Limited Edition: onwards from 2000, for the Hungarian market. Available for the 1.2 16V and 1.6 16V versions, it featured metallic paint, electrically adjustable and heated mirrors, fog lights, a passenger airbag and automatic A/C. The 1.6 16V also featured ABS.
- Special Edition: limited Edition, but only for the Bravo.
- Steel: last Bravo/Brava models, a "farewell" of October 2001, for the market of Western European, before the duo was discontinued. Offered in 1.2 16v, 1.6 16v and 1.9 JTD Sx models, it featured Metallic Gray/Black/Blue paint, GT's 15" alloy wheels (Bravo) or Special 14" Wheel Trims (Brava), GT's rear spoiler, darkened rear lights (Bravo), "Steel" logo in the C column, electrically adjustable and heated mirrors, fog lights, passenger airbag, automatic A/C, CD Player, GT's steering wheel and shift knob wrapped in leather, two tone black/blue seats, white GT cluster and silver gt console and dash trim.
- Suite: available only for the 1.6/1.8/1.9 JTD Bravo GT for the Swiss market, in Blue or Black metallic colours, featuring special seven spoke 15" alloy wheels, the GT's rear spoiler, Suite logo in the C Column, front passenger airbag, side airbags, electrically adjustable and heated mirrors, fog lights, automatic A/C, remote central locking, a high quality four speaker CD player with a CD Changer, GT leather wrapped steering wheel and shift knob, silver center console and dash trim and a full leather interior in cream, dark brown, dark blue or black.
- Trofeo: available only for the 1.2 Bravo Sx, for Western European markets, for 2000. Similar to the "Formula", it featured metallic Gray/Blue/Black/Sprint Blue/Sky Blue paint, GT's 15" alloy wheels painted with special gray paint, GT's rear spoiler, Trofeo written on the front wings, electrically adjustable and heated mirrors, fog lights, automatic A/C, GT's leather shift knob and steering wheel, white GT's cluster, silver center console and dash trim, blue/black two tone seats and door trim.
- Yellow: Hungarian 1.2 16v Sx Bravo, featuring the GT's alloy wheels, electrically adjustable and heated mirrors, fog lights and only available in a distinct yellow.

== HGT Abarth ==
In the end of 1999, Fiat introduced the Abarth accessories for the Bravo, available were more aggressive wheels and bodykit, performance was the same as the 2.0 HGT model. It was produced from 2000 to 2002.

== Engines ==
Model 1995–2003	Engine	Displacement	Power	Torque	Note	0–100 km/h (0–62 mph) (Bravo/Brava)
Petrol engines
1.4 S/SX	I4	1,370 cc	80 PS (59 kW; 79 hp) at 6000 rpm	112 N⋅m (83 lb⋅ft) at 2750 rpm	Until 1999	13.7s – 13.9s
80 SX/HSX	I4	1,242 cc	82 PS (60 kW; 81 hp) at 5500 rpm	113 N⋅m (83 lb⋅ft) at 4250 rpm	From 1999	12.5s – 13.0s
100 SX/HSX/ELX	I4	1,581 cc	103 PS (76 kW; 102 hp) at 5750 rpm	144 N⋅m (106 lb⋅ft) at 4000 rpm	–	11.0s – 11.5s
115 ELX/HLX/GT	I4	1,747 cc	113 PS (83 kW; 111 hp) at 6100 rpm	154 N⋅m (114 lb⋅ft) at 4400 rpm	–	10.0s – 10.3s
Brava HGT	I4	1,747 cc	132 PS (97 kW; 130 hp) at 6500 rpm	186 N⋅m (137 lb⋅ft) at 4500 rpm	Brava only, from 2001	8.5s
Bravo HGT	I5	1,998 cc	147 PS (108 kW; 145 hp) at 6100 rpm	186 N⋅m (137 lb⋅ft) at 4500 rpm	Bravo only, until 1999	8.5s
155 HGT VIS	I5	1,998 cc	155 PS (114 kW; 153 hp) at 6500 rpm	186 N⋅m (137 lb⋅ft) at 3750 rpm	Bravo only, from 1999, used a plastic variable geometry intake manifold	8.0s
Diesel engines
1.9 D SX	I4	1,929 cc	65 PS (48 kW; 64 hp) at 4600 rpm	119 N⋅m (88 lb⋅ft) at 2000 rpm	–	17.8s – 17.8s
TD 75 SX	I4	1,910 cc	75 PS (55 kW; 74 hp) at 4200 rpm	147 N⋅m (108 lb⋅ft) at 2750 rpm	–	15.1s – 15.5s
TD 100 SX/ELX	I4	1,910 cc	100 PS (74 kW; 99 hp) at 4200 rpm	200 N⋅m (148 lb⋅ft) at 2250 rpm	–	10.8s – 11.0s
JTD 105 SX/ELX/GT	I4	1,910 cc	105 PS (77 kW; 104 hp) at 4000 rpm	200 N⋅m (148 lb⋅ft) at 1500 rpm	From 1999	10.4s – 10.6s
JTD 100 SX/ELX/GT	I4	1,910 cc	100 PS (74 kW; 99 hp) at 4000 rpm	200 N⋅m (148 lb⋅ft) at 1500rpm	From 2001 to 2003	10.4s – 10.6s

== Brazil ==
The Brava was produced from September 1999 to 2003 in Brazil for the home market and export, but in the former, the engines available were:

- Brava SX/ELX 1.6 16v (106 PS (78 kW))
- Brava HGT 1.8 16v (127 PS (93 kW) or 132 PS (97 kW))
