= Fiat Panorama =

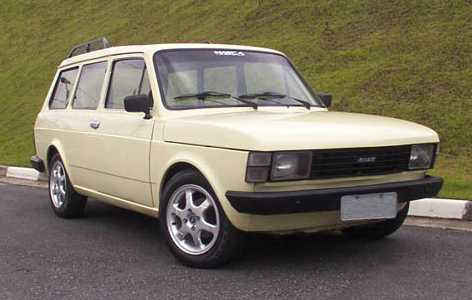

Overview
- Manufacturer: Fiat
- Production: 1980-1986
- Assembly: Brazil, Colombia

Body and chassis
- Class: Supermini (B)
- Body style: 3-door station wagon
- Layout: FF layout
- Related: Fiat 147; Fiat Oggi

Powertrain
- Transmission: 4 and 5-speed manual

Dimensions
- Length: 3,924 mm (154.5 in)
- Width: 1,545 mm (60.8 in)
- Height: 1,412 mm (55.6 in)
- Curb weight: 846 kg (1,865 lb)

Chronology
- Successor: Fiat Duna Weekend

The Fiat Panorama is a 3-door station wagon version of the Fiat 147, a subcompact car produced in South America by Italian automaker Fiat. The Panorama was built in Brazil and released in March 1980 as one of the first small station wagons to be produced there. The Panorama was phased out in 1986 to give its market to Elba/Duna Weekend.

Some current cars available in that market were the Volkswagen Brasilia, Volkswagen Variant, Ford Belina and Chevrolet Caravan. Some time later, there were Chevrolet Marajó (end of 1980) and Volkswagen Parati (1982).

The mechanicals of the 147 were adapted for a heavier weight. The appeal of Panorama was the economy of space and fuel. The length was the smaller of all Brazilian wagons (3924 mm/154 in) but the internal space was equivalent to the bigger ones. In order to create more room space, the spare tire was placed along with the engine, as in 147. The light weight allowed a small fuel consumption either of gasoline or alcohol.

It was sold in three engine options: a 1048 cc gasoline with a maximum output of 56 hp (42 kW) and a 1297 cc gasoline or alcohol with a maximum output of 60 hp (45 kW) and 61 hp (46 kW) respectively. The two trim levels were C and CL. The 1050 engine was available only with the C trim level.
