= Fiat 124 series engine =

Fiat 124/OHV engine
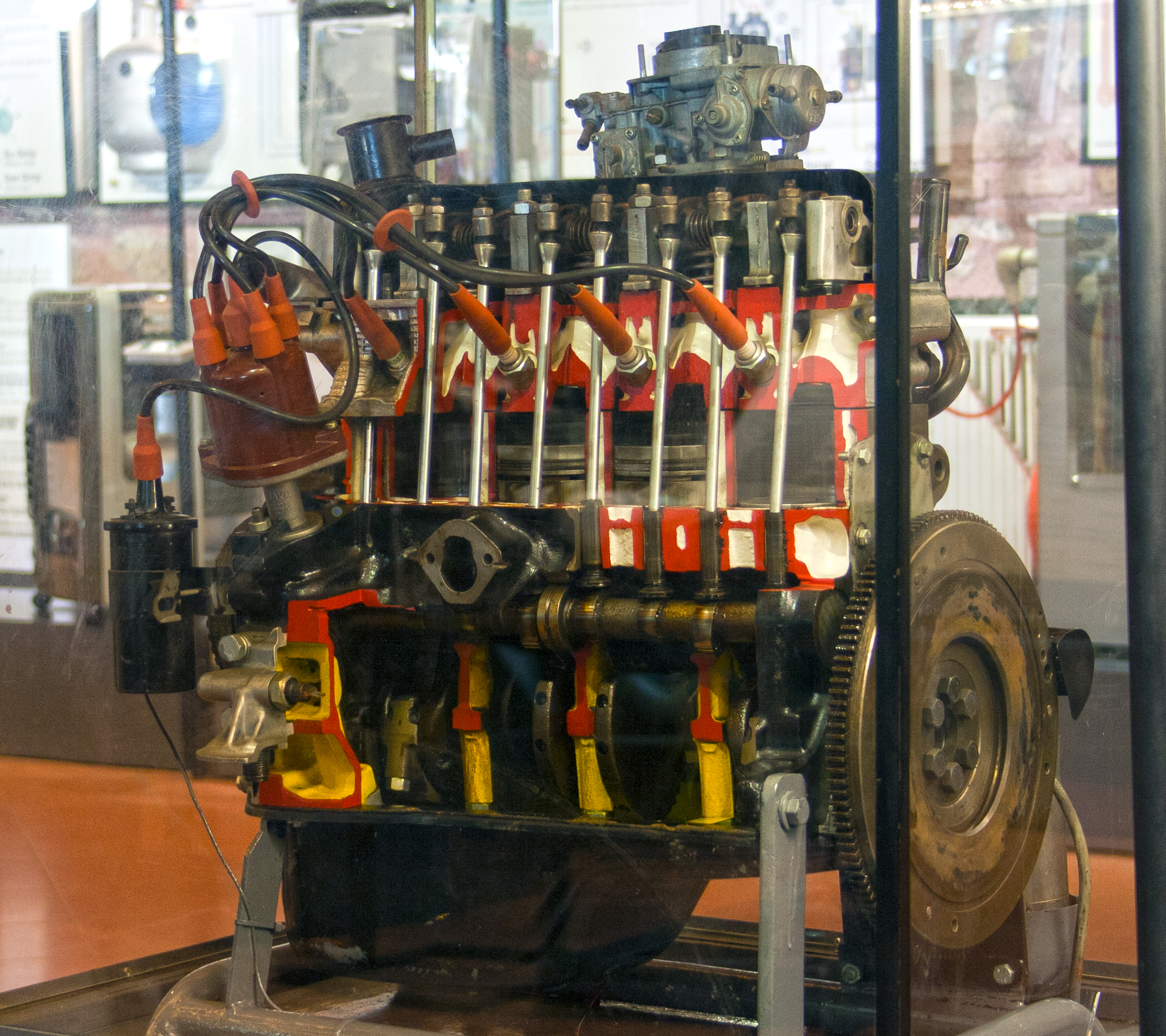
- 131 A1.000 1.6 L (1,585 cc) OHV engine

Overview
- Manufacturer: Fiat / Fiat Automóveis (Brazil)
- Production: 1966–1999

Layout
- Configuration: Inline-4
- Displacement: 1.2–2.0 L (1,197–1,995 cc)
- Cylinder bore: 73 mm (2.87 in); 76 mm (2.99 in); 78 mm (3.07 in); 80 mm (3.15 in); 84 mm (3.31 in)
- Piston stroke: 71.5 mm (2.81 in); 90 mm (3.54 in)
- Cylinder block material: Cast iron
- Cylinder head material: Aluminium
- Valvetrain: OHV 2 valves x cyl. SOHC 2 valve x cyl.

Combustion
- Turbocharger: In some versions
- Fuel system: Carburetor, Indirect injection
- Fuel type: Gasoline, Diesel
- Cooling system: Water-cooled

Chronology
- Successor: Fiat Twin-cam

Designed by Aurelio Lampredi, the Fiat 124 engine first appeared in the all-new Fiat 124 in April 1966. The in-line four-cylinder engine comprised an iron block with an aluminium cylinder-head with pushrod actuated valves. In 1974, with the introduction of the Fiat 131, a toothed belt replaced the chain to drive the camshaft. While originally of an overhead valve design, an overhead cam version was added to the facelifted 131 in 1981. The capacity was initially 1.2 L (1,197 cc) (in the Fiat 124), but eventually ranged between 1.2 and 1.9 L (1,197 and 1,929 cc). There were also three SOHC diesel iterations of 1.4, 1.7, and 1.9 litres. European production of the petrol versions ended with the Fiat 131 in 1984, but later diesel derivatives continued to be built until 1999. It did have a longer life in its twin-cam iteration, which continued in production until 2000. The 1.9 L (1,929 cc) direct-injected diesel version was the first direct-injection diesel to appear in a production passenger car, the Fiat Croma Turbo D i.d.

== Engine specifications ==
The Fiat 124 series engine was produced in a number of configurations differing in stroke and bore but maintaining a standard bore-spacing. The first model (124 A.000) was near square, using a bore and a stroke of 73 mm × 71.5 mm (2.87 in × 2.81 in) to produce a displacement of 1.2 L (1,197 cc). A larger 1.4 L (1,438 cc) version arrived in October 1968, in the 124 Special. This has an 80 mm (3.15 in) bore. The bore was increased to 76 mm (2.99 in) to give a displacement of 1.3 L (1,297 cc) for the 131, which was also available in a 1.6-litre version with a 84 mm (3.31 in) bore. A variety of other bores and strokes were available. Several of the Brazilian Fiasa engines share their bore and stroke with the 124 series engines and were sometimes used in the same cars, but the engines are not related.

The 1.3 was later bored out by 0.1 mm, to nudge the displacement above 1.3 liters. This allowed Italian motorists to drive a full 140 km/h (87 mph) on the autostrada, rather than the 130 km/h (81 mph) which was allowed for cars under 1.3 litres.

The 124-series engine has five main bearings, a cast iron block and a reverse-flow aluminum alloy head. Intake and exhaust are both located on the right-hand side of the engine.

There are also overhead camshaft versions of the 124-series engine. The first was the Fiat Twin Cam, which used the 124-series block with some modifications to use a DOHC valvetrain with a crossflow head. The Italian single overhead cam version arrived in 1981 and formed the basis for the three diesel versions.

The 1.4 L (1,367 cc) diesel was available in turbocharged guise in the Uno Turbo D, while the larger 1.9-litre version was also available with direct injection.

There was also a two-litre pushrod version (6132 AZ 2000) for the 1974 to 1982 Fiat Nuova Campagnola; this has the 84 mm (3.31 in) bore of the 1.6 but combined with a 90 mm (3.54 in) stroke.

Valid engine bore/stroke combinations
Stroke (mm)	Bore (mm)						
Stroke (mm)	73	76	76.1	78	80	82.6	84
71.5	1197; OHV	1297; OHV	1301; OHV	1367; SOHC, diesel	1438; OHV	1533	1585; OHV, SOHC
79.2	1326	1437	1441	1514	1592	1697 diesel	1756
90	1507	1633	1637	1720	1810	1929 diesel	1995; OHV

== Applications ==
List of vehicles using variations of the Fiat 124-series engine (incomplete).

=== Fiat ===
OHV

- Fiat 124: 1966-1974
- Fiat 131 Mirafiori: 1974-1981 (longer for the Weekend/Estate)
- Fiat 238: 1968-1983 (CR 7.7 Normale, CR 9.2 Super)
- Fiat 241: 1965-1974
- Fiat 242: 1974-1987
- Fiat Campagnola: 1974-1987
- Abarth 1300 Scorpione: 1969-1971
- Autobianchi Primula: 1968-1970
- Autobianchi A111: 1969-1972

SOHC

- Fiat 131 Mirafiori: 1981-1984
- Fiat Croma: 1985-1991

Diesel engine

- Fiat Uno: 1986-1995 (Europe)
- Fiat Ritmo: 1985-1988
- Fiat Regata: 1984-1990
- Fiat Fiorino: 1988-1999
- Fiat Duna: 1987-1991
- Fiat Ducato: 1987-1999
- Fiat Croma: 1988-1997
- Fiat Tipo: 1988-1995
- Fiat Tempra: 1990-1997
- Fiat Bravo/Brava: 1995-1997
- Lancia Delta: 1986-1991
- Lancia Prisma: 1984-1989
- Lancia Dedra: 1989-1999

=== SEAT ===
OHV

- SEAT 124: 1968–1980
- SEAT 1430: 1969–1975
- SEAT 131 L / Mirafiori L / Supermirafiori CL: 1975-1984
- SEAT Sport 1200/1430: 1975-1979
- SEAT 128: 1976–1980
- SEAT Ritmo: 1980–1983
- SEAT Fura Crono: 1981-1983
- SEAT Ronda: 1982–1984
