= Fiat 147 =

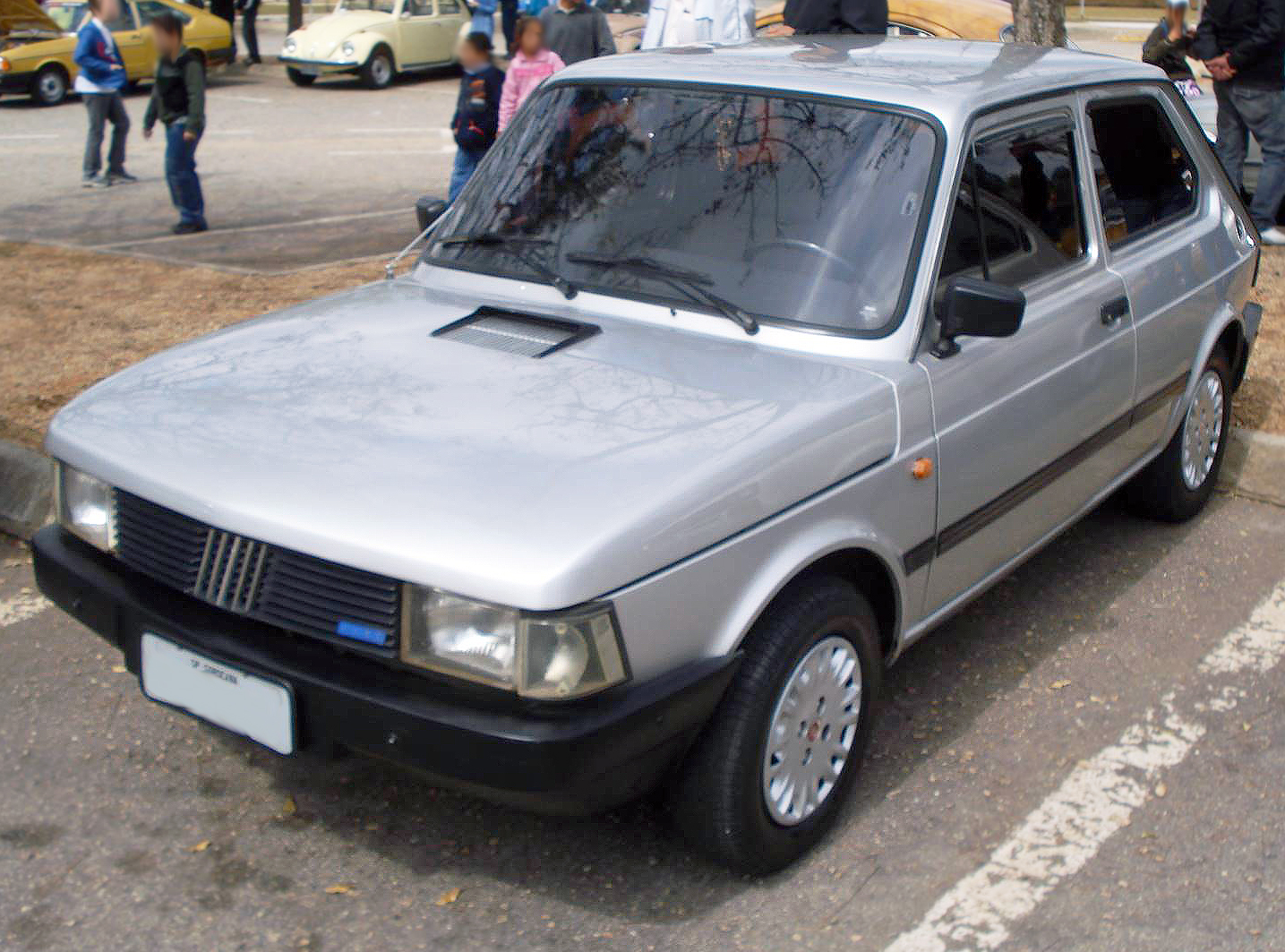
- Fiat 147, second facelift ("Spazio")

Overview
- Manufacturer: Fiat
- Also called: Fiat 147 City (pick-up); Fiat 148 (Panorama, Uruguay); Fiat Brío; Fiat Spazio; Fiat Tucán; Fiat Vivace (Argentina)
- Production: 1976–1987 (Brazil); 1982–1996 (Argentina); 1979–1984 (Colombia)
- Assembly: Brazil: Betim; Argentina: Córdoba (Sevel); Chile: Rancagua; Colombia: Bogotá (CCA); Uruguay: Canelones (Nordex S.A.); Venezuela: La Victoria, Aragua

Body and chassis
- Class: Supermini (B)
- Body style: 2-door sedan 3-door hatchback 3-door station wagon 2-door coupé utility (pickup); 3-door panel-van
- Layout: FF layout
- Related: Fiat 127; SEAT 127; SEAT Fura; Fiat Fiorino; Fiat Oggi; Fiat Panorama

Powertrain
- Engine: 903 cc 100 series OHV I4; 1049 cc Fiasa OHC I4; 1116 cc 128 OHC I4 (RA); 1297 cc Fiasa OHC I4; 1301 cc Fiasa OHC I4; 1301 cc 128 OHC I4 (RA); 1372 cc Tipo OHC I4 (RA); 1301 cc Fiasa diesel I4
- Transmission: 4 or 5-speed manual

Chronology
- Predecessor: Fiat 133 (Argentina)
- Successor: Fiat Uno

The Fiat 147 was a three-door hatchback subcompact car produced by Fiat in the Brazilian state of Minas Gerais from autumn 1976 until 1987, when it was replaced by the Fiat Uno. It was the Brazilian variant of the Fiat 127. Some were also built by Sevel in Argentina (where later models were named Fiat Spazio, Brío and Vivace) until 1996, and assembly also took place in Colombia, Uruguay and Venezuela. It is notable for being the first modern car to use ethanol as fuel instead of petrol.

== Brazil ==
During the two decades that followed the Second World War, the available fuels in Europe had featured progressively higher octane ratings, and compression ratios of European cars had increased correspondingly. However, the cheaper (so called yellow grade) petrol widely distributed in Brazil in 1976 had an octane rating of just 73, so for Brazil it was necessary to use a relatively low compression ratio of 7.2 to 1. In order to provide adequate power with the lower compression ratio, a larger engine was needed, and the Fiat 147 was launched with a 1049 cc unit with a five-bearing crankshaft in place of the 903 cc, three-bearing engine that then was still standard in the 127s from Turin. Press reports of the time reported that the larger engine produced a much smoother and quieter drive as well as enhanced torque. The original 147 was only available in a single model, the 147 L.

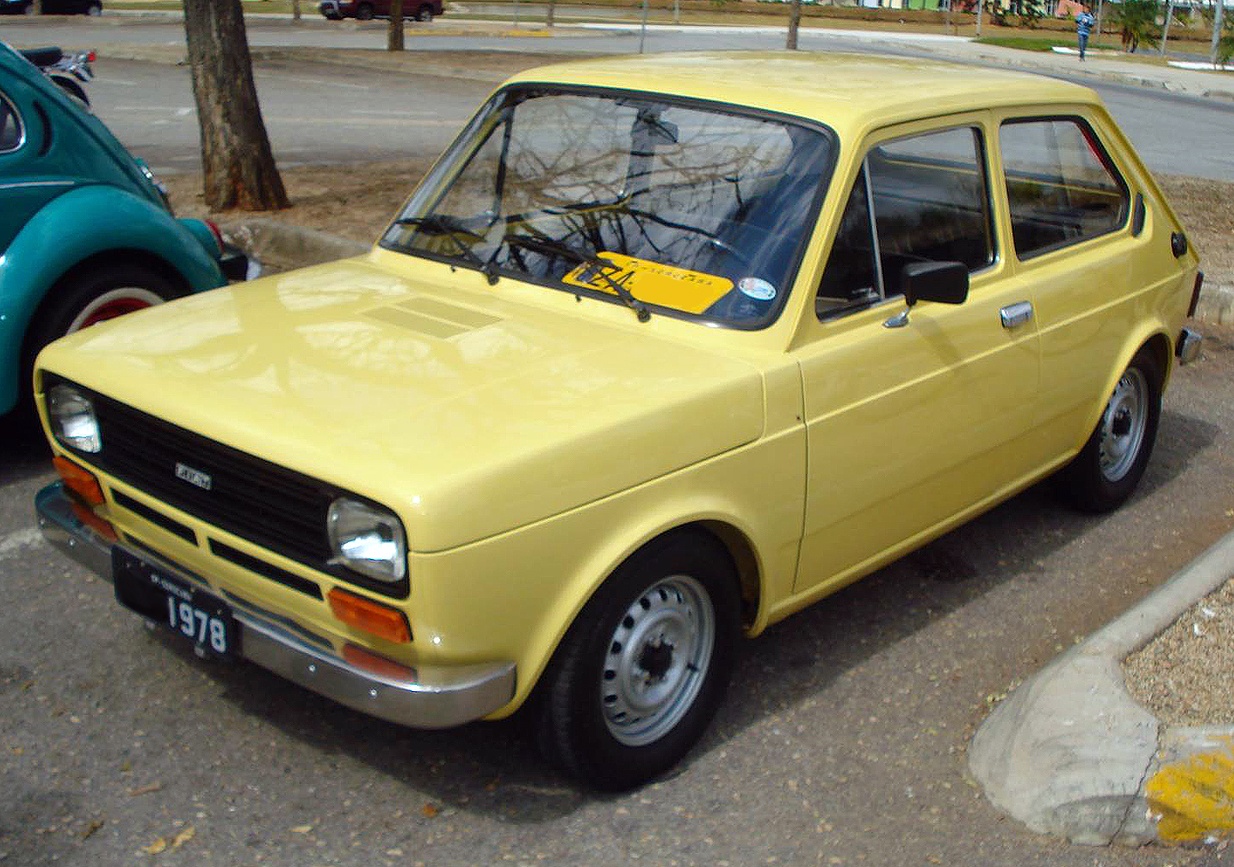
Early (1978) Fiat 147

The 1.05-litre Fiasa engine, along with some of the revised bodyshell elements of the 147 (most notably the rear three-quarter panels), were later introduced on the Series 2 version of the 127 itself, when it was released in Europe a year later. After having been introduced in a single version in the fall of 1976, the lineup was divided into 147 (standard), 147 L, and 147 GL in November of the next year. In general, Fiat do Brasil introduced their changes for the coming model year at the time of the Salão do Automóvel, usually held in November. In 1978, the 147 lineup received the addition of the Furgoneta van. The Furgoneta had a solid division between the front seats and the cargo area, while all rear windows (including the one in the hatch) were panelled. Originally only available with the 1050 engine, the Furgoneta later also received the 1.3-liter álcool-powered engine.

The 147 was the first modern car to use ethanol (E100) as fuel instead of petrol. The performance slightly increased and fuel consumption was 30 percent higher but the cost of the alcohol was a quarter of that of the gasoline because, at that time, petrol had become expensive as a consequence of the 1973 oil crisis. This version was nicknamed "cachacinha" (little cachaça) because it had the smell of that drink.

In November 1978 the luxurious GLS was added, fitted with a 63 PS (46 kW) 1.3 liter engine. This engine also found its way into the mildly sporting Rallye (November 1978) where it produced 72 PS (53 kW). The GLS was superseded by the "Top" for the 1982 model year, while the Rallye was replaced by the "Racing" version. In lower-tuned form, the 1.3-liter engine was also installed in the 147 CLS, Oggi CS, and Panorama CL. The 147 Racing was shortlived, replaced by the 147 TR after the 1983 "Spazio" facelift.

In April 1980 the "Panorama" station wagon model was added. A 45 PS (33 kW) 1301 cc diesel engine, based on the 1,049 cc unit, was announced in August 1980 and entered production in early 1981. This was only ever marketed abroad, as private car owners in Brazil were not allowed to register diesel cars. This version, complete with face-lifted Brazilian market bodywork, was also exported to Europe as a "127" beginning in 1981. In 1982, the diesel engine was also added to the Panorama, which also became available in Europe as a 127.

The 147 underwent a number of facelifts during its career. The earliest cars had a front clip similar to the European 127, but later a new, reverse-rake front appearance called the "Europa" was developed. Later yet (1983), the front was redesigned to match Fiat's new corporate face as defined by the new Uno. The pre-facelift body remained in use for 1980 and 1981 on the cheapest 147 base model, which received larger openings beneath the grille in 1981 as had the Fiorino the year before. To mark the newer versions as different, they received the additional "Spazio" label: this name later came to replace the "147" badge in Argentina. Along with the facelift, engine outputs all crept up by a few horsepower. In Venezuela, the Spazio was sold exclusively with the more powerful 72 PS engine as used in the Brazilian TR version. Production of the 147 C continued into 1987, after it had effectively been replaced by the new Uno. A mere 256 cars were built in 1987, however.

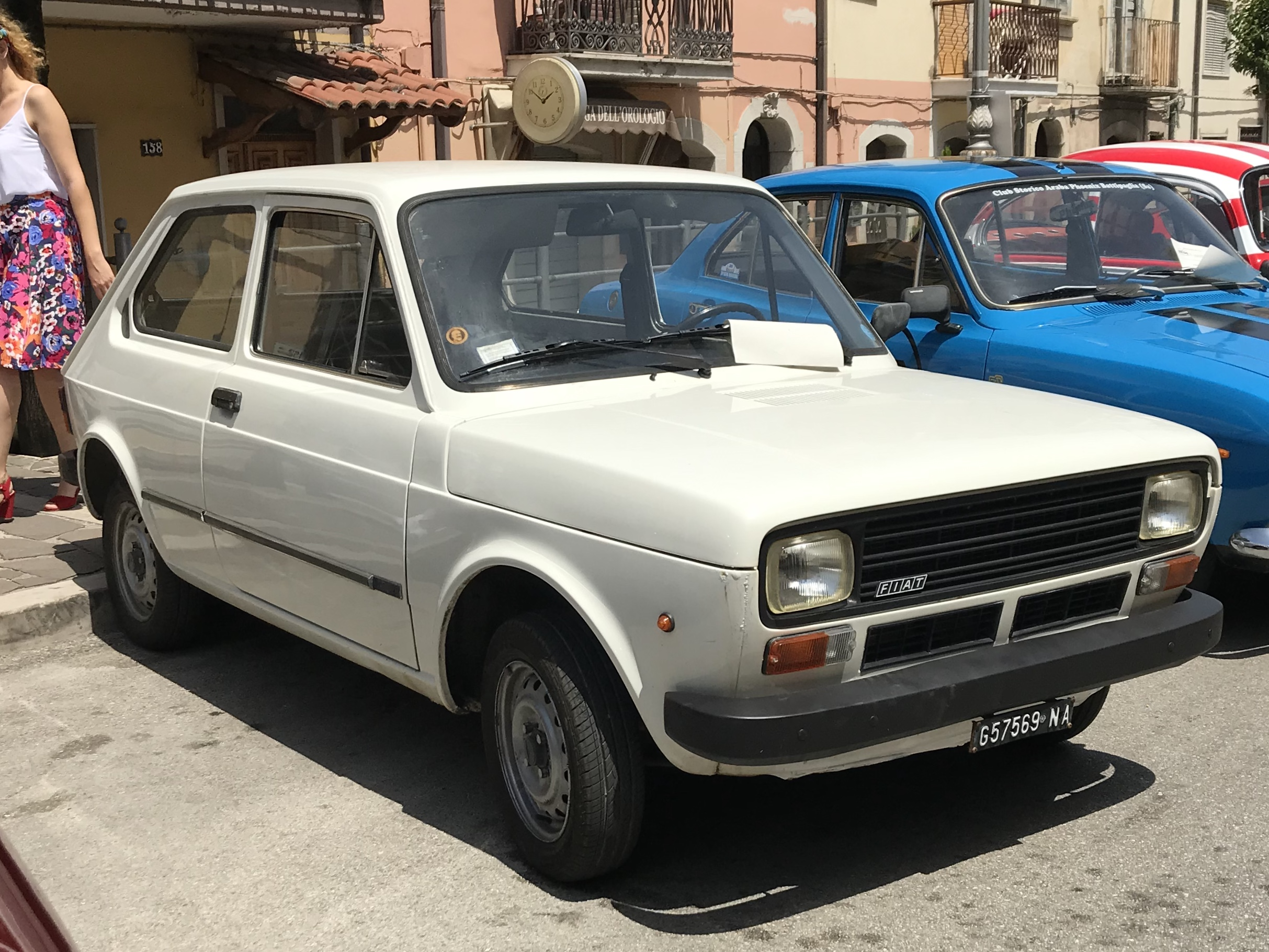
1981 Fiat 147 - only this model year received enlarged openings beneath the grille

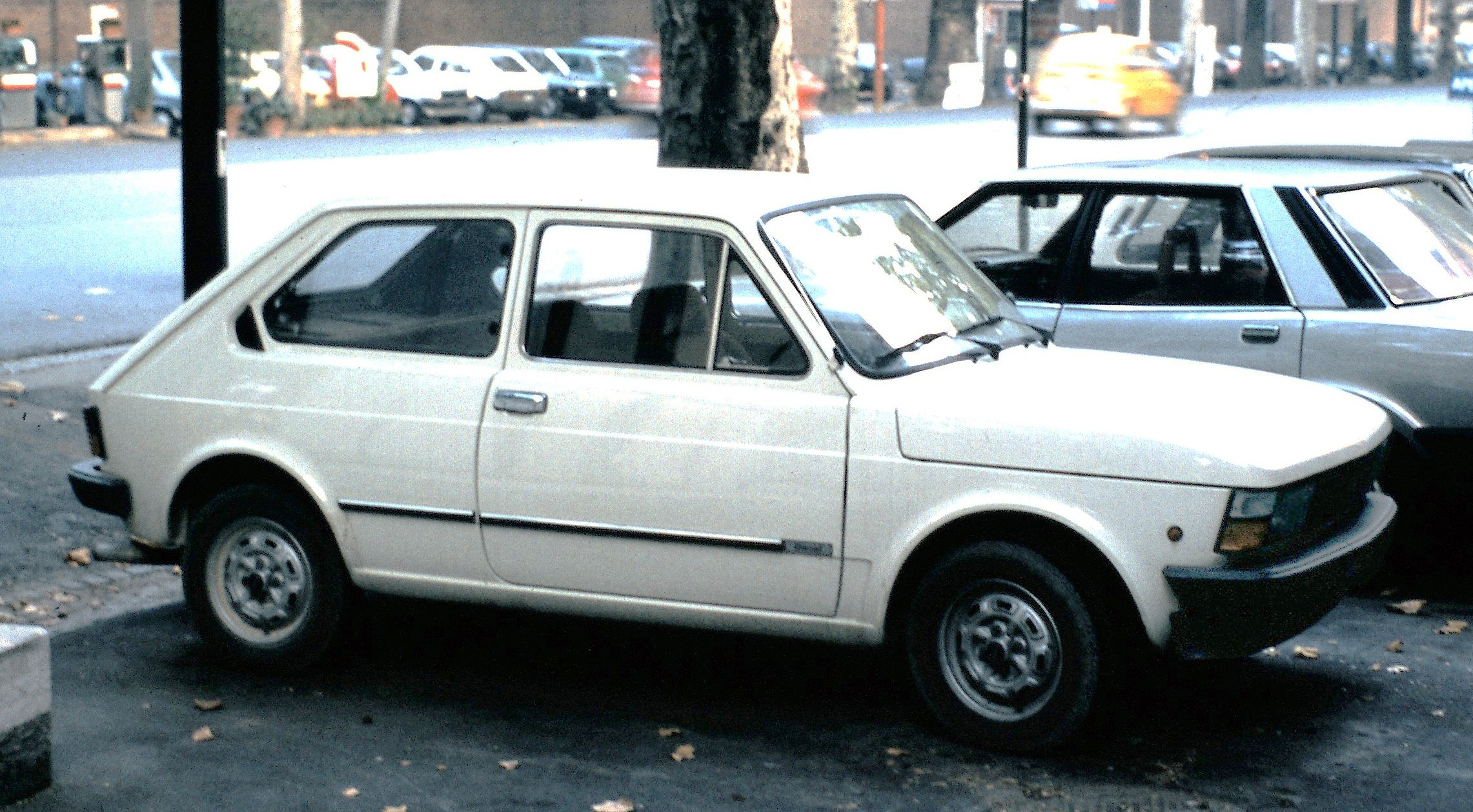
The first facelift version of the 147 (Italian market car, carrying "127" labels)

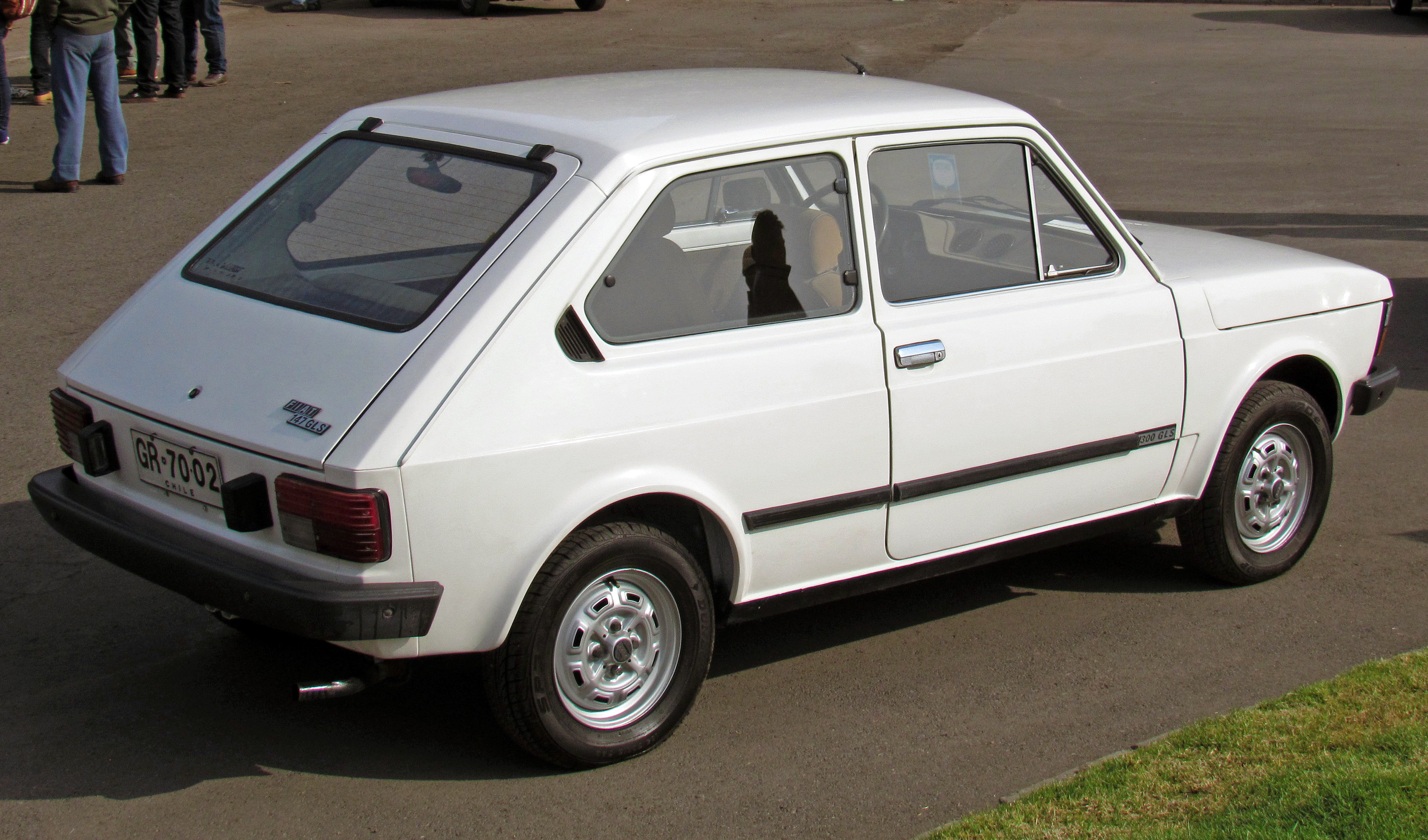
1982 Fiat 147 GLS, rear view (Europa front)

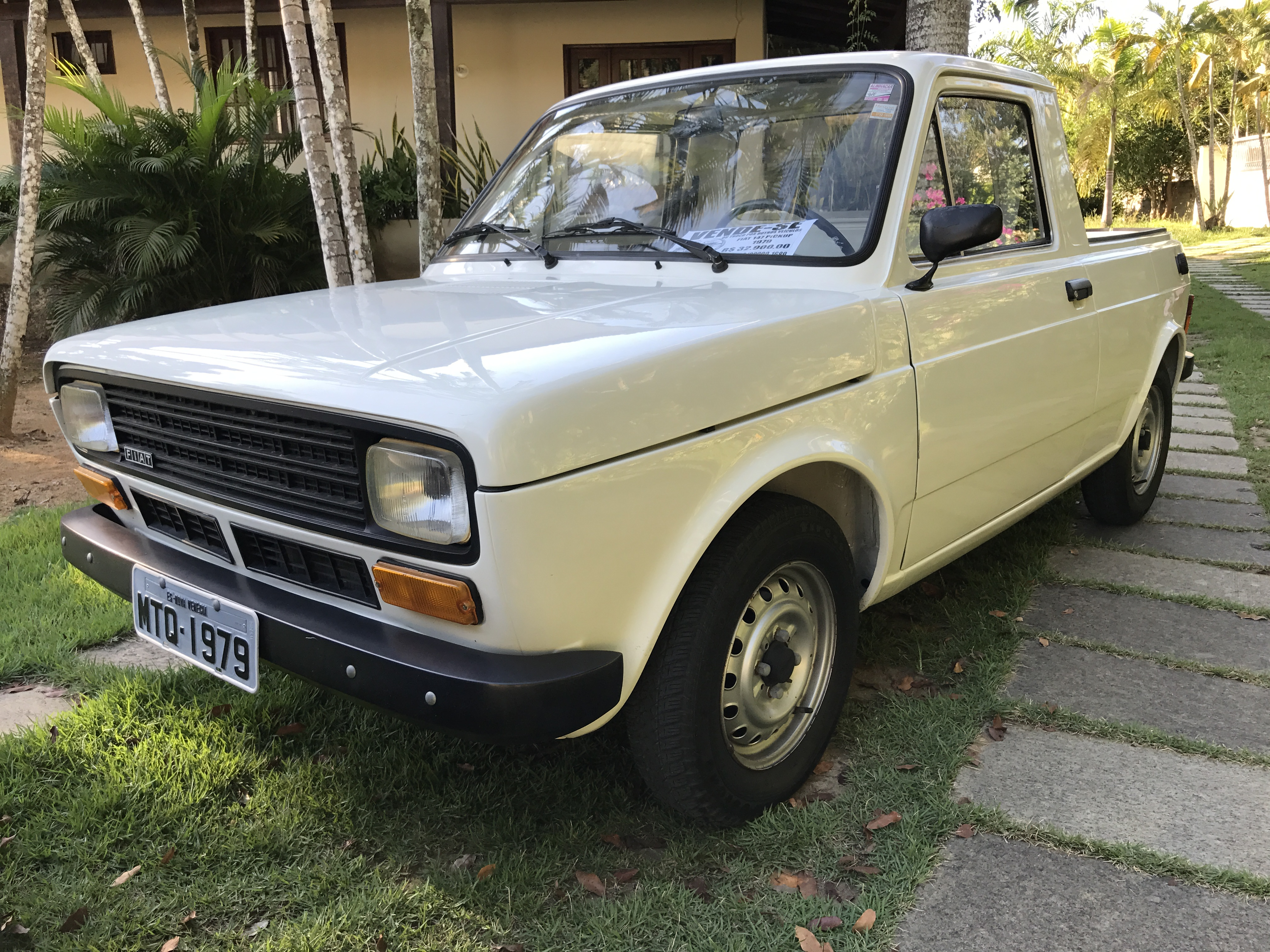
Fiat 147 Pick-up

=== Derivatives ===
The derivatives of the Fiat 147 were a saloon called the Fiat Oggi and an estate called the Fiat Panorama. The Panorama arrived first, in April 1980, originally with either the 1.05 or the 1.3 L petrol engines. The Oggi first appeared in the spring of 1983, just after the introduction of the second facelift. There were also van and pick-up versions available, sold as the Fiorino. The original 147 Pickup (late 1978) sat on the regular 147 bottom plate, but this bodystyle was changed to the longer Panorama chassis in 1981. The Panorama was also available with the diesel engine, mainly for European export but also for assembly in Uruguay, where the Panorama was sold as the Fiat 148.

== Argentinian career ==
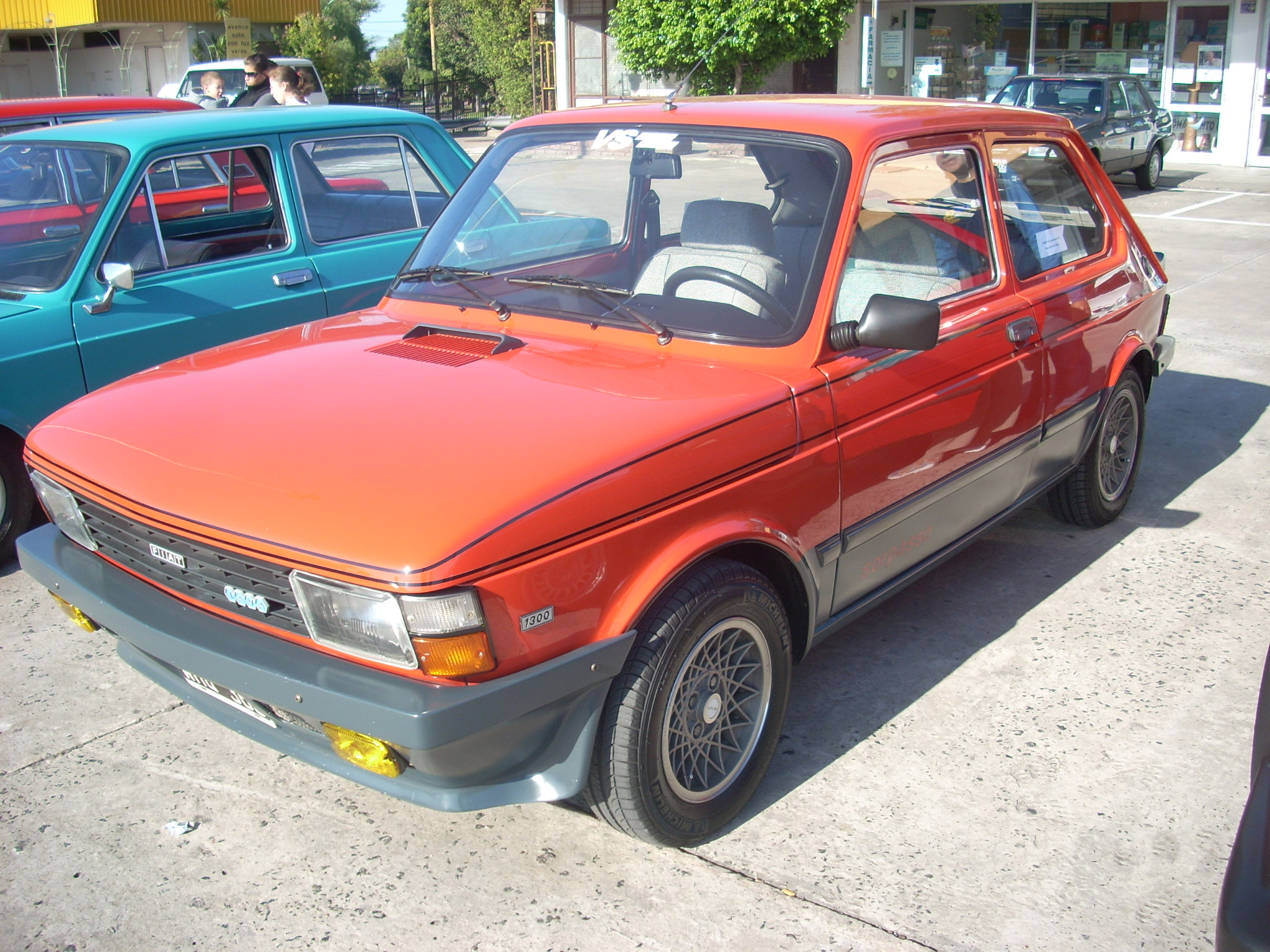
Fiat 147 Sorpasso (IAVA)

Argentinian production of the 147, with the 903 cc OHV (as used in the earlier Fiat 133) or the Brazilian 1,049 cc OHC engine, began in January 1982. The 147 had been announced a half year earlier as part of Sevel's attempts to modernize the lineup they had inherited from Fiat Concord. The short-lived original lineup consisted of the smaller engined 147 C and the better equipped 147 CL which received the larger engine. The 903 cc engine had a twin-barrel Weber carburetor and produces 48 PS (35 kW) at 6000 rpm, while the 1.05 received a single-barrel Brosol-Solex carburetor and offered 52 PS (38 kW) at 5600 rpm.

In October 1982, the locally built 1,116 cc four-cylinder 128-series unit replaced the original two engines. In May 1983 a five-speed transmissions arrived for the new, somewhat sporty TR 5. This also received a 60 PS (44 kW) 1.3 liter engine. The 1.3 had already been used for the highly tuned IAVA Sorpasso since 1982, but with a twin carburettor and 90 PS (66 kW). With a top speed of 163 km/h (101 mph), this is the most powerful factory-built 127 derivative ever. 405 Sorpassos were built until 1984. At the opposite end of the spectrum the 147 TRD, fitted with the same diesel engine as Brazilian-built 147s, was added during 1984.

In November 1984 the new Spazio appeared, with the same front clip as the second facelift used in Brazil. Big, square headlights and bumpers, along with re-designed taillights and Fiat's current corporate grille made for a much more modern appearance. Engines and equipment levels remained unchanged, although the smaller 1.1 and the diesel disappeared by 1990. The 1.3 was complemented by a larger 1,372 cc version in 1991, this was renamed the Fiat Vivace in 1993. Production continued until 1996.

An interesting sub-species was the 1987 Fiat Brío - this utilized the original, pre-facelift, Brazilian bodywork from 1976 for a special bargain version with the 1.1 engine. The Brío was discontinued in 1989.

== Production and markets ==
A total of 1,269,312 units were produced in Fiat's Brazilian factory in Betim, plus 232,807 units in the Sevel plant of Córdoba, Argentina. This includes Panoramas and Fiorinos; the total of three-door 147/Spazios built in Brazil (excluding CKD production) is 709,230. The 147 and derivatives were also assembled in the CCA plant in Bogotá, Colombia.

Some Fiat 147s were exported to Europe, mainly with the diesel engine or with the Panorama bodywork. Aside from the two different fronts used (first and second facelift), they can also be differentiated from Italian-built Fiat 127s (and the corresponding Spanish-built Seat 127s) by the extractor vents in the rear three-quarter pillar.

== Works cited ==
- Castaings, Francis; Samahá, Fabrício (2016-07-08). "Fiat 147, um pequeno que foi grande em significado" [Fiat 147, a small car of great significance]. Best Cars (in Portuguese). Archived from the original on 2020-07-26.
- de Simone, Rogério; Ferraresi, Rogério (2016), Clássicos do Brasil: Fiat 147 [Brazilian Classics: Fiat 147] (in Portuguese), Alaúde, ISBN 978-8578813642
