= Fiat 128 SOHC engine =

Fiat SOHC engine
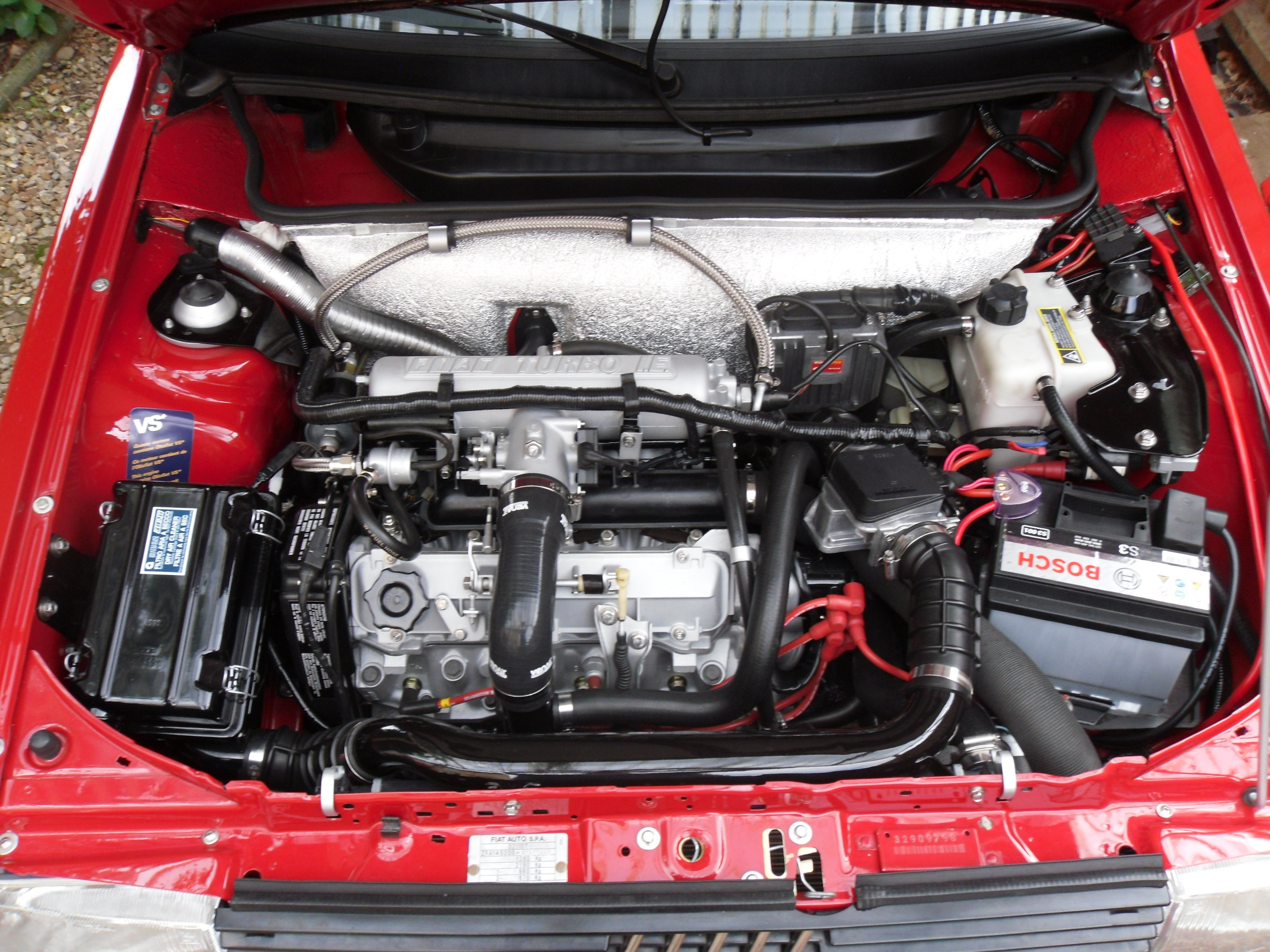

Overview
- Manufacturer: Fiat; Lancia; Zastava Automobiles; Tofaş
- Also called: Fiat Torque engine
- Production: 1969–2010

Layout
- Configuration: Inline-4
- Displacement: 1.1–1.8 L (1,116–1,839 cc)
- Cylinder bore: 80–86.4 mm (3.15–3.40 in)
- Piston stroke: 55.5–78.4 mm (2.19–3.09 in)
- Cylinder block material: Iron
- Cylinder head material: Aluminium
- Valvetrain: SOHC 2 valves x cyl. DOHC 4 valves x cyl.

Combustion
- Turbocharger: In some versions
- Fuel system: Weber carburetor Multi-point fuel injection Single-point injection
- Fuel type: Gasoline
- Cooling system: Water-cooled

Output
- Power output: 55–133 hp (41–99 kW)

Chronology
- Successor: Fiat Pratola Serra engine E.torQ engine FIRE Turbojet/Multiair engine

Designed by Aurelio Lampredi, the Fiat SOHC engine first appeared in the front-wheel drive (FWD) Fiat 128 of 1969. The in-line four-cylinder engine comprised an iron block with an aluminium cylinder-head containing a single overhead camshaft operating directly on both the inlet and exhaust valves in a reverse-flow cylinder-head configuration. The camshaft was driven by a toothed belt rather than chain. The engine remained in production until about 2010 and grew in capacity over the years from 1100 cc (in the Fiat 128) to an eventual 1900 cc (in the Fiat Linea). The Fiat 130 2.9 L (2,866 cc) V6 engine, also appearing in 1969, although having crossflow cylinder head, is directly related to the 128 SOHC engine, but with a 1.20 upscale in bore and stroke. The 128 SOHC engine was gradually replaced by the Pratola Serra engine series starting from 1995, and in the 1100 cc guise, by the FIRE unit of comparable displacement. It was also converted to use a multivalve DOHC head, giving birth to the Torque engine, used until 2005.

== Design and production ==
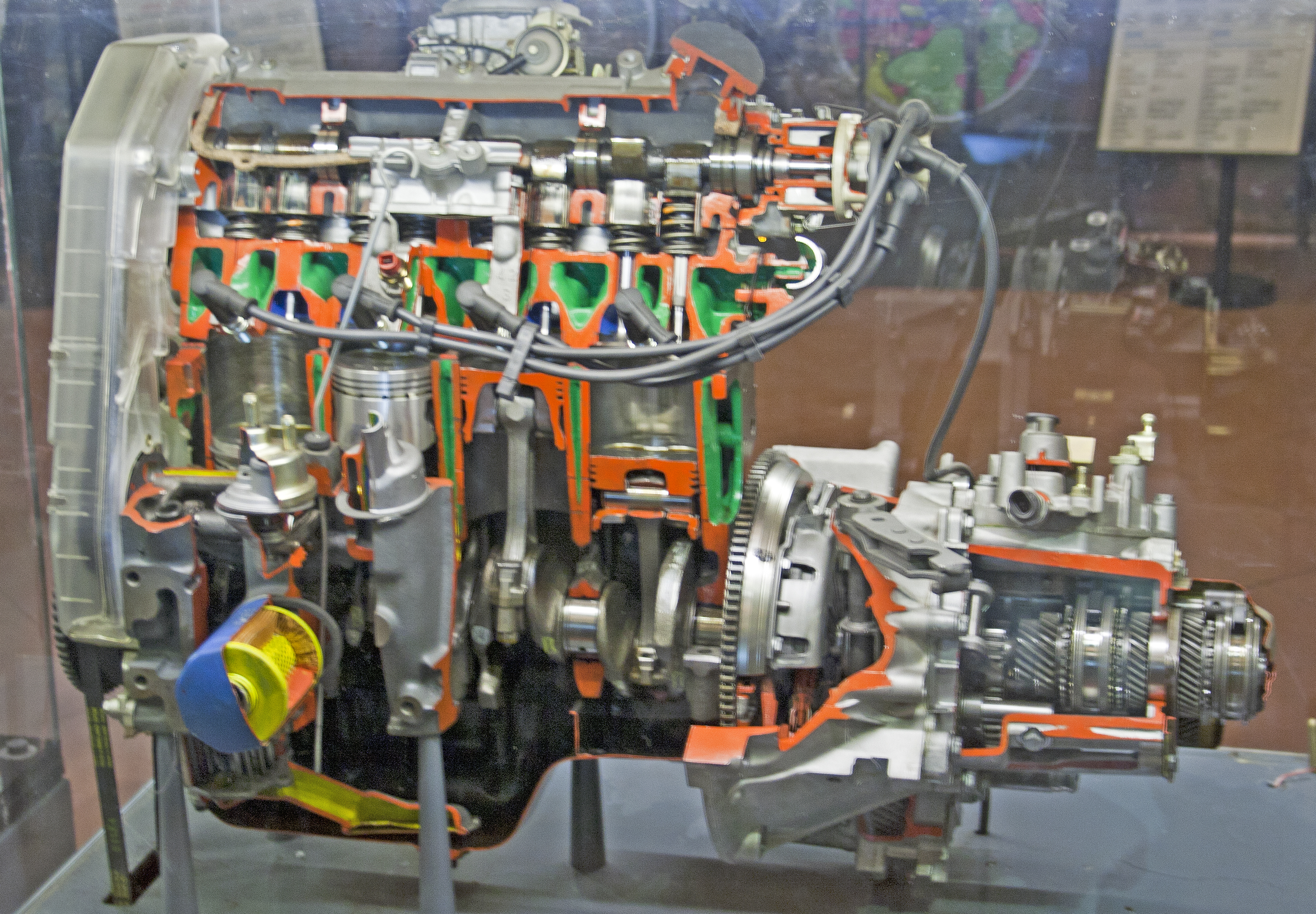
Cut apart 1,581 cc version of the 128 engine

The engine was designed as a transversely-mounted FWD-only power-plant, being the second engine/gearbox combination to exhibit the now standard transverse engine-next-to-gearbox layout with unequal length driveshafts (the first was the Autobianchi Primula drive-train, the Mini had its gearbox in the sump of the engine). The exception to the engine's FWD-only design is its revolutionary use as a mid-engine drive-train in the Fiat X1/9. Also, Tofaş has adapted 128 engines into its Fiat 131 based longitudinally-mounted, front-engine, rear-wheel-drive layout platform. Unusual for the time was the electrically driven fan, rather than it being powered directly by the engine. The 128 engine has five crankshaft bearings.

A prominent feature of the Fiat SOHC engine is its massively over-square proportions. This over-square design allows large (within the constrains of a reverse-flow configuration) valve sizes relative to engine capacity. A secondary benefit is the short crank throw, which reduces the accelerative forces on the con-rod allowing the engine to operate at significantly increased engine-speeds. The original engine's limit was only reached at 8000 rpm.

The 1.3 L (1,301 cc) version was turbocharged and used in the Fiat Uno Turbo. The 1.4 L (1,372 cc) unit was also turbocharged and first used in the MkII Uno Turbo, then in the Punto GT.

As with its bigger brother the famous Fiat DOHC (aka Fiat/Lancia Twincam) engine, the Fiat SOHC engine was shared with the Fiat subsidiary Lancia (appearing in 1,500 cc guise in the Lancia Delta/Prisma of the 1980s) as well as being used in the Fiat 127 derived Yugo.

The final incarnation of the 128 SOHC engine was modified to use 16 valves and double overhead camshafts. The engine (using the designation "Torque") initially featured the bore-spacing, bore and stroke of the 1.6 L (1,581 cc) 159/160 series engine with a new 16 valve DOHC crossflow cylinder-head. To incorporate the extra oil-return-paths and symmetrical head (as opposed to the asymmetrical SOHC head) the cylinder-block was slightly revised making the DOHC head non-interchangeable with the previous incarnations of the 128 engine. It powered the Brava/Bravo, Marea and Multipla Fiat automobiles as well as the second-generation Lancia Delta. It was then replaced with a version based on the 1.4 L (1,372 cc) block with a longer 78.4 mm stroke, displacing 1.6 L (1,596 cc), ending production in 2005. That same stroke of the later version was also used in Brazil with the earlier 1.6 L block, giving birth to a 1.8 L (1,839 cc) version, used in the Linea.

== Engine specification ==
The Fiat SOHC engine was produced in a number of configurations differing in stroke and bore, but maintaining a standard bore-spacing. The first generation of 128 derived engines used a bore and a stroke of 80 mm × 55.5 mm (3.15 in × 2.19 in) to produce a displacement of 1.1 L (1,116 cc). The bore was increased to 86 mm (3.4 in) (maintaining the 55.5 mm (2.19 in) stroke) to give a displacement of 1.3 L (1,290 cc) for the 128 Rally. This engine was later used in the 128 Coupé and X1/9. The original 1.3 L (1,290 cc) 128/X1/9 engine is the only one of the family to have used the 86 mm (3.4 in) bore. The second generation used bores of either 80 or 86.4 mm (3.15 or 3.40 in) with strokes of 55.5 or 63.9 mm (2.19 or 2.52 in) giving three engine capacities. The final generation of SOHC engines standardised on a longer 67.4 mm (2.65 in) stroke with either an 80.5 or 86.4 mm (3.17 or 3.40 in) bore (giving 1.4 and 1.6 L (1,372 and 1,581 cc) respectively). The 67.4 mm (2.65 in) stroke with the 86.4 mm (3.40 in) bore was subsequently used by the early Torque engines, while the later Torque units used an 80.5 or 86.4 mm (3.17 or 3.40 in) bore with a 78.4 mm (3.09 in) stroke.

Valid engine bore/stroke combinations

Stroke (mm)	Bore (mm)				
Stroke (mm)	80	80.5	86	86.4	
55.5	1116	1130	1290	1302	Capacity (cc)
63.9	1285	1301	1485	1499	Capacity (cc)
67.4	1355	1372	1566	1581	Capacity (cc)
78.4	1576	1596	1821	1839	Capacity (cc)

Key
1st generation
1st & 2nd generation
2nd generation
3rd generation
3rd generation & 1st generation Torque
2nd generation Torque

Engine specification (by engine-number)
Engine Code	Bore (mm)	Stroke (mm)	Capacity (cc) stated	Capacity (cc) calculated	Production (from - to)	BHP	Notes
128.A.000	80	55.5	1116	1116	1969–1982	55-65	128
128.A1.000	86	55.5	1290	1290	1971–1978	75-85	128 Rally & Sport
128.AS.000	86	55.5	1290	1290	1972–1978	75	X1/9 1300
128.A.064	80	55.5	1116	1116	1971–2010	55-64	Zastava 101
128.A1.064	80	55.5	1116	1116	1979–1983	64	Zastava 101
128.A2.064	80	55.5	1116	1116	1988–2008	60	Zastava Koral/Yugo
128.AC.000	86	55.5	1290	1290	1989–1983	73	
128.A7.064	86	55.5	1290	1290	1981–1986	65	
128.A6.064	86.4	55.5	1298	1302	1987–2008	65	
11.E1.064	80	55.5	1116	1116	1986–1998	60	
13.E1.064	86.4	55.5	1298	1302	1986–1998	65	
13.E3.064	86.4	55.5	1298	1302	1988–1998	65	Zastava Florida
11.MA.064	80	55.5	1116	1116	1998–2008	60	
13.MA.064	86.4	55.5	1298	1302	1998–2008	65	
131.C.000	80.5	67.4	1372	1372	1980–1984	70	131 Mirafiori 1.4
131.C2.000	86.4	67.4	1581	1581	1980–1984	85	131 Mirafiori 1.6CL
131.D1.016	86.4	67.4	1581	1581	1992–2002	96	Tofaş Doğan and Kartal 1.6 S, SL, SLX (carb)
131.D2.016	86.4	67.4	1581	1581	1995–2002	92	Tofaş Şahin S, Kartal
131.F3.016	86.4	67.4	1581	1581	1998–2002	96	Tofaş Doğan and Kartal 1.6 S, SLX (i.e., cat)
131.F4.016	80.5	67.4	1372	1372	1995–2002	82	Tofaş Şahin 1.4
138.A.000	80	55.5	1116	1116	1978–1985	60	Ritmo 60
138.A1.000	86.4	55.5	1301	1302	1978–1982	75-65	Ritmo 65
138.A2.000	86.4	63.9	1498	1499	1978–1982	75-85	X1/9 1500, Ritmo 75
138.A3.000	86.4	55.5	1301	1302	1982	75	Ritmo S75
138.A4.000	86.4	63.9	1498	1499	1980–1982	75-85	X1/9 1500, Ritmo S85
138.A5.000	86.4	55.5	1301	1302	1982–1985	70	Also 138.AS.000
138.B.000	80	55.5	1116	1116	1983–1985	55	Uno 55
138.B1.000	80	55.5	1116	1116	1982–1985	55-58	Ritmo Mk II
138.B2.000	86.4	55.5	1301	1302	1983–1986	68-70	Uno 70
138.B3.000	86.4	63.9	1498	1499	1982–1985	70-85	Regata 85S
146.A4.048	80	55.5	1116	1116	1985–1989	58,5	Uno 60
146.A2.000	80.5	63.9	1301	1301	1985–1989	105	Uno Turbo Mk I
146.A2.146	80.5	63.9	1301	1301	1987–1989	99	Uno Turbo Mk I (cat)
146.A2.246	80.5	63.9	1301	1301	1989–1991	101	Uno Turbo Mk II (cat)
146.A8.000	80.5	67.4	1372	1372	1989–1994	118	Uno Turbo Mk II
146.A8.046	80.5	67.4	1372	1372	1989–1993	111	Uno Turbo Mk II (cat)
146.C1.000	80.5	67.4	1372	1372	1989–1993	72	Uno 70SXie
149.A7.000	86.4	55.5	1301	1302	1986–1989	65	Uno 70SX
149.C1.000	86.4	63.9	1498	1499	1988	75	Uno 75 SX i.e. (cat)/Selecta
159.A2.000	80.5	67.4	1372	1372	1990–1993	76	Tipo/Tempra 1.4 (carb & i.e.)
159.A3.000	86.4	67.4	1581	1581	1990–1996	75-78	Tipo/Tempra 1.6 (carb & i.e.)
159.B9.000	86.4	67.4	1581	1584	1996	90	Tempra i.e.
160.A1.000	80.5	67.4	1372	1372	1988–1993	72	Tipo/Tempra 1.4 i.e.
160.A1.046	80.5	67.4	1372	1372	1992–1993	69	Uno Selecta
160.A2.000	86.4	67.4	1580	1581	1988–1993	83	Tipo/Tempra 1.6 (carb & i.e.)
176.A4.000	80.5	67.4	1372	1372	1993–1995	133	Mk I Punto GT (GT1), CR 7.8:1
176.A4.000	80.5	67.4	1372	1372	1995–1997	133	Mk I Punto GT (GT2), CR 7.8:1
176.B6.000	80.5	67.4	1372	1372	1997–1999	130	Mk I Punto GT (GT3), CR 9.0:1
176.A9.000	86.4	67.4	1581	1581	1994–1997	88	Mk I Punto Sporting & Cabrio
178.B2.016	80.5	67.4	1372	1372	1996–2002	71	Palio/Siena 1.4EL
178.B3.000	86.4	67.4	1581	1581	1996–2005	103	DOHC 16v, Palio/Siena/Albea
182.A4.000	86.4	67.4	1581	1581	1995–2002	103	DOHC 16v, Bravo/Brava/Marea/Multipla/Lancia Dedra/Delta Mk II
182.B6.000	80.5	78.4	1596	1596	2002–2005	103	DOHC 16v, Marea/Multipla/Stilo/Palio/Siena/Strada/Doblò/Lancia Lybra
310 A3.011	86.4	78.4	1839	1839	2008–2010	132	DOHC 16v, Brazilian Linea 1.9 16v Torque
835.C1.000	86.4	67.4	1581	1581	1989–1995	75-78	Tipo/Tempra 1.6 i.e. (Typ 160), Lancia Dedra Mk I/Delta Mk II (1.6 i.e.)
835.A1.046	86.4	67.4	1581	1581	1989–1994	75-78	Lancia Dedra Mk I (1.6 i.e.)
835.A1.000	86.4	67.4	1581	1581	1995–1997	90	Lancia Dedra Mk II (1.6 i.e.)

== Applications ==
List of vehicles using variations of the Fiat SOHC engine.

=== Fiat ===
- Fiat 128: 1969-1985
- Fiat X1/9: 1972-1989
- Fiat Ritmo: 1978-1988
- Fiat Strada: 1978-1988
- Fiat 131 Mirafiori: 1980-1984
- Fiat 147: 1982 (Argentina)
- Fiat Uno: 1983-1994
- Fiat Regata: 1985-1990
- Fiat Spazio/Vivace: 1991-1996
- Fiat Tipo: 1988-1995
- Fiat Tempra: 1990-1995
- Fiat Punto (Type 176): 1993-1999
- Fiat Bravo/Brava: 1995-2001
- Fiat Palio/Palio Weekend (Type 178): 1996-2005
- Fiat Siena (Type 178): 1996-2002
- Fiat Marea: 1996-2007
- Fiat Doblo (Type 223): 2000-2009
- Fiat Stilo: 2001-2005
- Fiat Albea: 2001-2007

=== Lancia ===
- Lancia Delta: 1979-1999
- Lancia Prisma: 1980s
- Lancia Dedra: 1990-1998

=== Zastava ===
- Yugo 55
- Yugo 60
- Yugo 65
- Zastava 101
- Zastava 128
- Zastava Poly
- Zastava Florida
- Yugo Sana 1.3 1.4

=== Tofaş ===
- Tofaş Şahin/Doğan/Kartal: 1992-2002

=== SEAT ===
- SEAT 128 Sport 1100/1300: 1979-1980

== Induction ==
=== Production ===
The Fiat SOHC used the full gamut of induction techniques through its long production run. The 128 and 138 series engines originally used a single down-draught carburettor. The carburettor was normally of progressive twin-choke design (two asymmetric sized chokes operated progressively) such as the Weber DMTR and DATR of the X1/9. Multi-point fuel injection (MPI) was introduced late in the 138 series to help meet lowered emission requirements in the US. The original MPI system comprised a large cylindrical plenum running parallel to the engine with individual runners to each inlet port and a single throttle controlling air-flow into the plenum. This plenum was pressurised in the Mk I Uno Turbo. The plenum was slightly redesigned to a more angular "box" shape for the 3rd generation engines and was again pressurised for the Uno and Punto GT Turbo models. For the 3rd generation engines, the down-draft carburettor was replaced with a Single-point injection system (SPI) in the base-level models. The SPI system mounts on a manifold similar to that of the carburetted models and looks, as well as acts, much like a single-choke carburettor with a single throttle plate but no venturi and a centrally mounted single injector.

==== Carburettor ====
Traditionally both down-draft (DCNF & IDF) and side-draft (DCOE) twin-choke carburettors have been used to extract more power from the 128 derived engines. IDFs are rarely used due to an incorrect orientation of the float-bowls (causing possible surge/starve issues under cornering), the correctly orientated DCNF being the preferred down-draft carburettor in this application (also having a much lower profile than the IDF). For ultimate power the DCOE carburettor is used even though the float-bowl direction matches that of the IDF (i.e. incorrect). The aforementioned carburettors are usually used in pairs (effectively giving one independently tuneable carburettor per engine-cylinder), though applications where a single DCNF/DCOE is used to feed a shared manifold do exist. DCNF's tend to be either 36 or 40 mm (1.4 or 1.6 in), the larger 44-DCNF is deemed too large for the engine. Both 40-DCOE and 45-DCOE are commonly used where space allows.

For a normal street car, a DMTR carburetor is commonly used in sizes varying from 32/32, 32/34 to 34/34.

==== MPI ====
Tuning of the early MPI systems has previously been difficult as the electronic control systems are analogue, making them difficult to "re-map". Low-cost DIY Fuel Injection (FI) controllers (such as MegaSquirt) have made it easier to alter the characteristics of the early MPI systems and release similar potential as the DCNF/DCOE carburettors. It is possible to "chip" the later digital MPI systems, though aftermarket FI controllers again give greater flexibility.

==== Throttle bodies ====
Individual FI Throttle Bodies (TBs) are available for mounting to DCNF and DCOE manifolds as well as custom-built FI systems which, with aftermarket controllers, give the most flexibility and control over fuelling out of all the options.

==== Motorcycle carburettors ====
Motorcycle, or "bike" carburettors, being a modern and cost-effective alternative to DCOE/DCNFs, have been adapted to work with the 128-derived engines. They potentially offer better control over fuelling than DCNF/DCOE, but their use on the Fiat SOHC engine is still in its infancy.

== Camshaft profile ==
The camshaft was a main methods of varying the 128 series engines characteristics for different applications/markets. The high-revving oversquare design of the 128 engine lends itself to high-overlap high-duration cam profiles better than more traditional square/under-square engine designs without losing drivability. Though a beneficial characteristic for sports orientated engine the high-overlap high-duration cam design gives poor emissions output which was unacceptable under the tightened US emissions regulations. To remedy this (in addition to the introduction of MPI) camshafts for emission-restricted markets featured asthmatic low-lift, low-duration, low-overlap profiles totally unsuited to the nature of the 128 engine.

=== Factory produced camshafts ===
Standard production camshaft specifications
Profile	Duration (degrees)	Overlap (degrees)	Lift (mm)	Clearance (mm) Inlet/Exhaust	Application
12/52-52/12	244	24	-	-	1.1 L 128 - European Specification
10/54-54/10	244	20	-	-	1.1 L 128 - North-American Specification
24/68-68/24	272	48	9.85	-	128 Rally
24/68-68/24	272	48	9.85	-	1300 X1/9 - European Specification
10/54-54/10	244	20	-	-	1300 X1/9 - North-American Specification
12/52-52/12	244	24	-	-	1300 X1/9 - Australian Specification
24/68-68/24	272	48	9.9	-	1500 X1/9 - European Specification (carb)
10/54-54/10	244	20	-	-	1500 X1/9 - North-American Specification (FI)
10/54-54/10	244	20	-	-	1500 X1/9 - Australian Specification (carb)
9/39-31/1	228-212	10	8	-	1.3 L Uno
0/30-40/10	210-230	10	8	-	1.3 L Uno Turbo
14/36-44/6	230	20	8.8	-	1.4 L Uno Turbo
7/35-37/5	222	12	8.8	0.4/0.5	1.6 Tipo
-	244	-	9.2	0.4/0.5	1.1/1.3 "DMB" Zastava - European Specification
-	256	-	9.2	-	1.6 90hp i.e. Punto/Tempra/Dedra

=== Aftermarket camshafts ===
Fast-road/race camshaft specifications
Manufacturer	Profile name	Profile	Duration (degrees)	Overlap (degrees)	Lift (mm)	Clearance (mm) Inlet/Exhaust	Application
Kent	FT7	35/67-67/35	282	70	10.33	0.20 / 0.20	NA - fast road
Kent	FT8	52/76-76/52	308	104	10.82	0.20 / 0.20	NA - race
Piper	BP270	33/67-67/33	280	66	9.80	0.20 / 0.20	NA - fast road
Piper	BP285	36/72-72/36	288	72	10.40	0.20 / 0.20	NA - fast road
Piper	BP300	39/71-71/39	290	78	11.18	0.25 / 0.25	NA - race
Piper	BP320	53/83-83/53	316	106	11.18	0.25 / 0.25	NA - race
