= Fiat Tipo Due platform =

Tipo Due platform
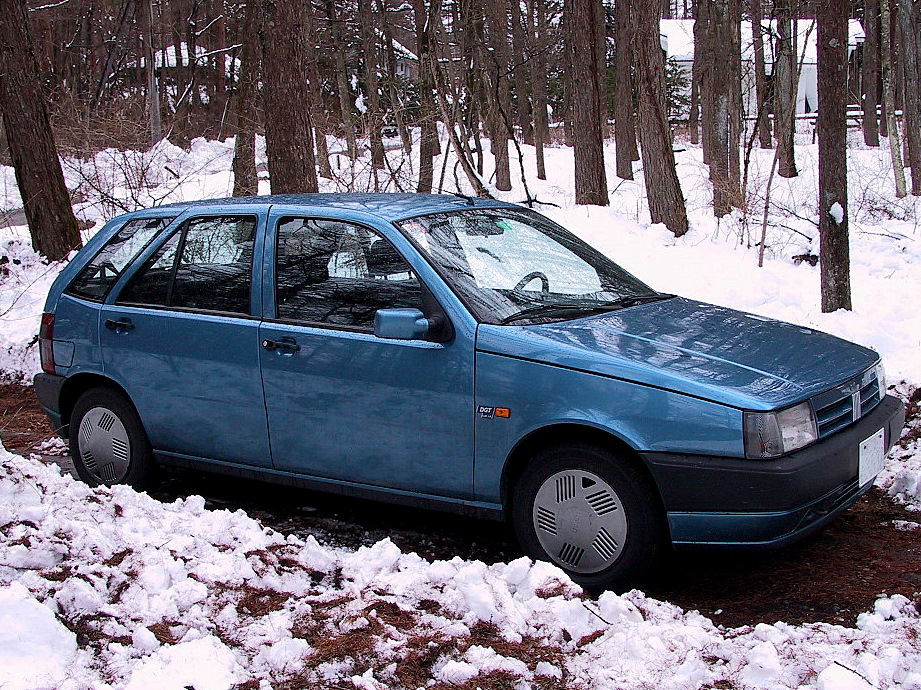

Overview
- Manufacturer: Fiat Group
- Also called: Tipo 2
- Production: 1988–2003

Body and chassis
- Class: Compact car platform
- Layout: Front-engine, front-wheel drive
- Vehicles: Alfa Romeo 145; Alfa Romeo 146; Alfa Romeo Spider; Alfa Romeo GTV; Fiat Tipo; Fiat Coupé; Lancia Delta
- Related: Fiat Tipo Tre platform

Dimensions
- Wheelbase: 2,540 mm (100.0 in)

Chronology
- Successor: Fiat C-platform

The Tipo Due platform (type two) was a front wheel drive platform designed by the Italian Fiat Group and used during the late 1980s, 1990s and early 2000s for a range of Alfa Romeo, Fiat and Lancia models. It introduced the concept of a "modular" platform, albeit not as modular as current platforms are, allowing the group to assemble various models, also with some special modifications, from the same floorpan. It uses four-wheel independent suspension, composed of MacPherson struts at the front and trailing arms at the rear, with Alfa Romeo Spider and GTV using a multilink setup rather than trailing arms.

The first generation Fiat C-platform was directly derived from this platform: it has only minor differences, and is also called "Type Two rev. 2". The Alfa Romeo 156, Lancia Lybra, Fiat Bravo/Brava and Marea platform is also derived from the Type Two rev. 2 platform and called "Type Two rev. 3", with stretched wheelbase and different suspension setups: MacPherson struts at the front and GLA (standing for "Guided Longitudinal Arms", "Bracci Longitudinali Guidati" in Italian) at the rear for the Lybra, double wishbones at the front and MacPherson struts at the rear for the Alfa.

The Tipo Tre platform was merely a stretched version of the Tipo Due, intended for Fiat Group's saloons such as the Fiat Tempra, with an all-wheel drive system available.

== Models ==
- Alfa Romeo 145
- Alfa Romeo 146
- Alfa Romeo Spider (916)
- Alfa Romeo GTV (916)
- Lancia Delta (836)
- Fiat Tipo (160)
- Fiat Coupé
- Alfa Romeo Vola concept
- Alfa Romeo Sportut concept
