= Fiat Tipo Tre platform =

Tipo Tre platform
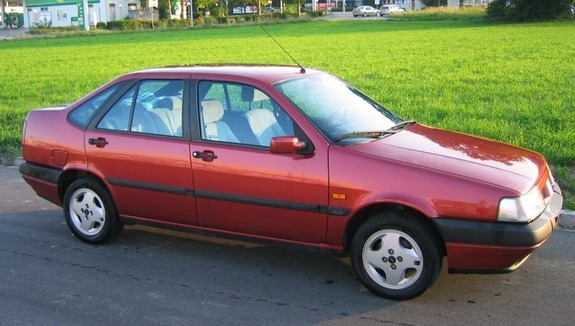

Overview
- Manufacturer: Fiat Group
- Also called: Tipo 3 Type Three
- Production: 1989–1999

Body and chassis
- Class: Compact car platform
- Layout: Front-engine, front-wheel drive / four-wheel drive
- Vehicles: Alfa Romeo 155; Fiat Tempra; Lancia Dedra
- Related: Fiat Tipo Due platform

Dimensions
- Wheelbase: 2,540 mm (100.0 in)

Chronology
- Successor: Fiat C-platform

The Tipo Tre platform (also known as the Type Three) is a front-wheel drive car platform designed by the Italian Fiat Group and used during the 1980s and 1990s for a range of Alfa Romeo, Fiat and Lancia models. It is closely related to the Tipo Due platform which was used in the Fiat Tipo, being merely a stretched version for the Fiat Group's saloons and with the added ability of allowing for all-wheel drive.

== Models ==
- Alfa Romeo 155
- Fiat Tempra
- Lancia Dedra
