= Lancia Dedra =

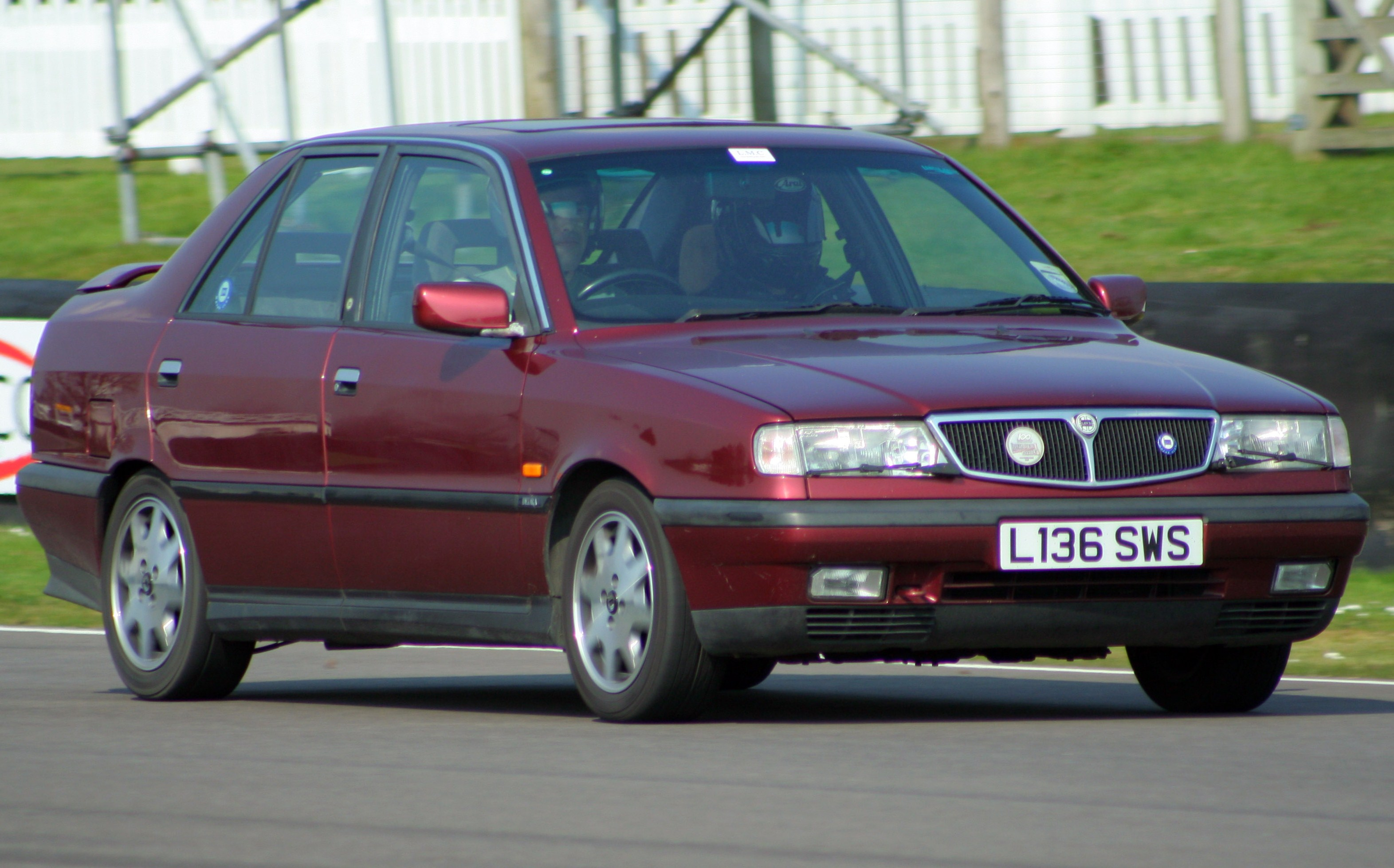

Overview
- Manufacturer: Alfa-Lancia Industriale (1989–1991); Fiat Auto (1991–1999)
- Production: April 1989 – March 1999; 462,638 built
- Assembly: Italy: Chivasso, Piedmont (Chivasso plant); Rivalta
- Designer: Ercole Spada at I.DE.A Institute

Body and chassis
- Class: Compact executive car (D)
- Body style: 4-door saloon; 5-door station wagon
- Layout: Front-engine, front-wheel-drive; Front-engine, all-wheel-drive
- Platform: Type Three (Tipo Tre)
- Related: Lancia Delta; Fiat Tempra; Alfa Romeo 155

Powertrain
- Engine: petrol: 1.6 L I4; 1.6 L 16V I4; 1.8 L I4; 1.8 L 16V I4; 2.0 L I4; 2.0 L 16V I4; 2.0 L turbocharged I4; diesel: 1.9 L turbocharged I4
- Transmission: 5-speed manual; 4-speed automatic

Dimensions
- Wheelbase: 2,540 mm (100.0 in)
- Length: 4,340 mm (170.9 in); 4,343 mm (171.0 in) (SW)
- Width: 1,700 mm (66.9 in)
- Height: 1,430 mm (56.3 in); 1,446 mm (56.9 in) (SW)
- Curb weight: 1,060–1,330 kg (2,337–2,932 lb)

Chronology
- Predecessor: Lancia Prisma
- Successor: Lancia Lybra

The Lancia Dedra (Type 835) is a compact executive car produced by the Italian automaker Lancia from 1989 to 1999. It was initially designed to support, and went on to replace, the Prisma which, six years after its launch, was having difficulty remaining competitive in the market. It was based on a stretched version of the platform underpinning the second generation of the Delta (which launched in 1993) and is often considered a saloon variant of the Delta.

== History ==
The task of the Dedra was demanding, it had to continue the legacy of the Prisma, which relaunched the Lancia brand in the field of compact executive cars, and to expand its market share if possible. Being larger than its predecessor, the Dedra was positioned as the second flagship car of Lancia that could satisfy those looking for an elegant medium-sized sedan but did not want to buy an executive car, such as the Thema.

The Dedra was designed by Ercole Spada of the I.DE.A Institute and produced an excellent drag coefficient of only 0.29. The core concept of the Dedra was prestige, exclusivity, personality and comfort, achieved through a high level of equipment and use of materials (e.g. Alcantara) as well as details such as configurable colours, alloy wheels and an attention given to soundproofing, ventilation and other creature comforts. The ability to obtain the perfect driving position was helped by the adjustable seats, steering wheel and electrically adjustable mirrors. Safety, both passive with a structure designed to minimize injury in an accident, and active, such as ABS and airbag, was also near the top of the Dedra's agenda.

In order to help the Fiat Group achieve economies of scale, the Dedra was based on the Fiat Tipo Tre platform. This single floorpan thus formed the basis for three different cars with three different product themes: elegance for the Lancia Dedra (1989), convenience at a competitive price for the large-booted Fiat Tempra (1990), and sportsmanship for the Alfa Romeo 155 (1992).

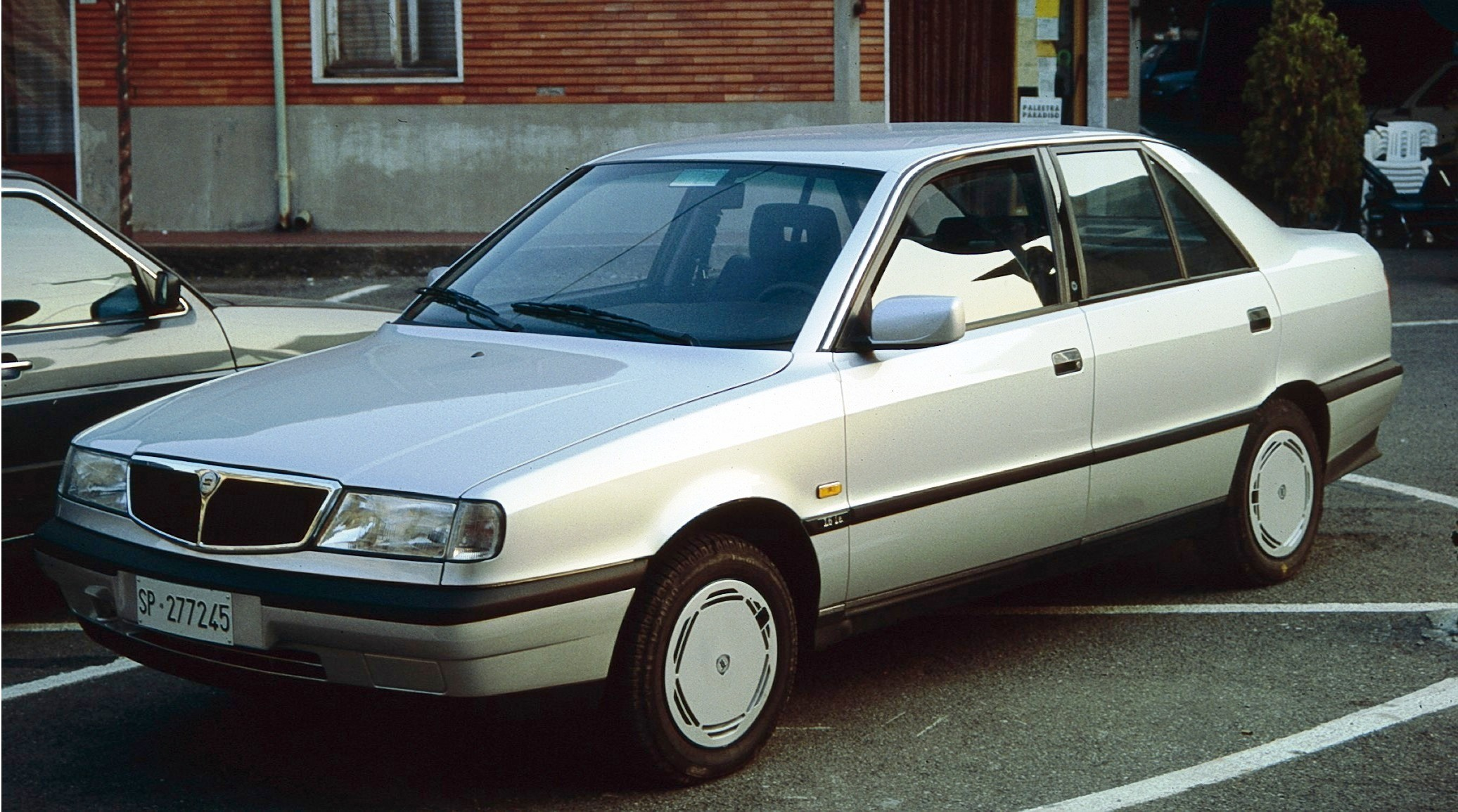
Initial, pre-facelift model (front)

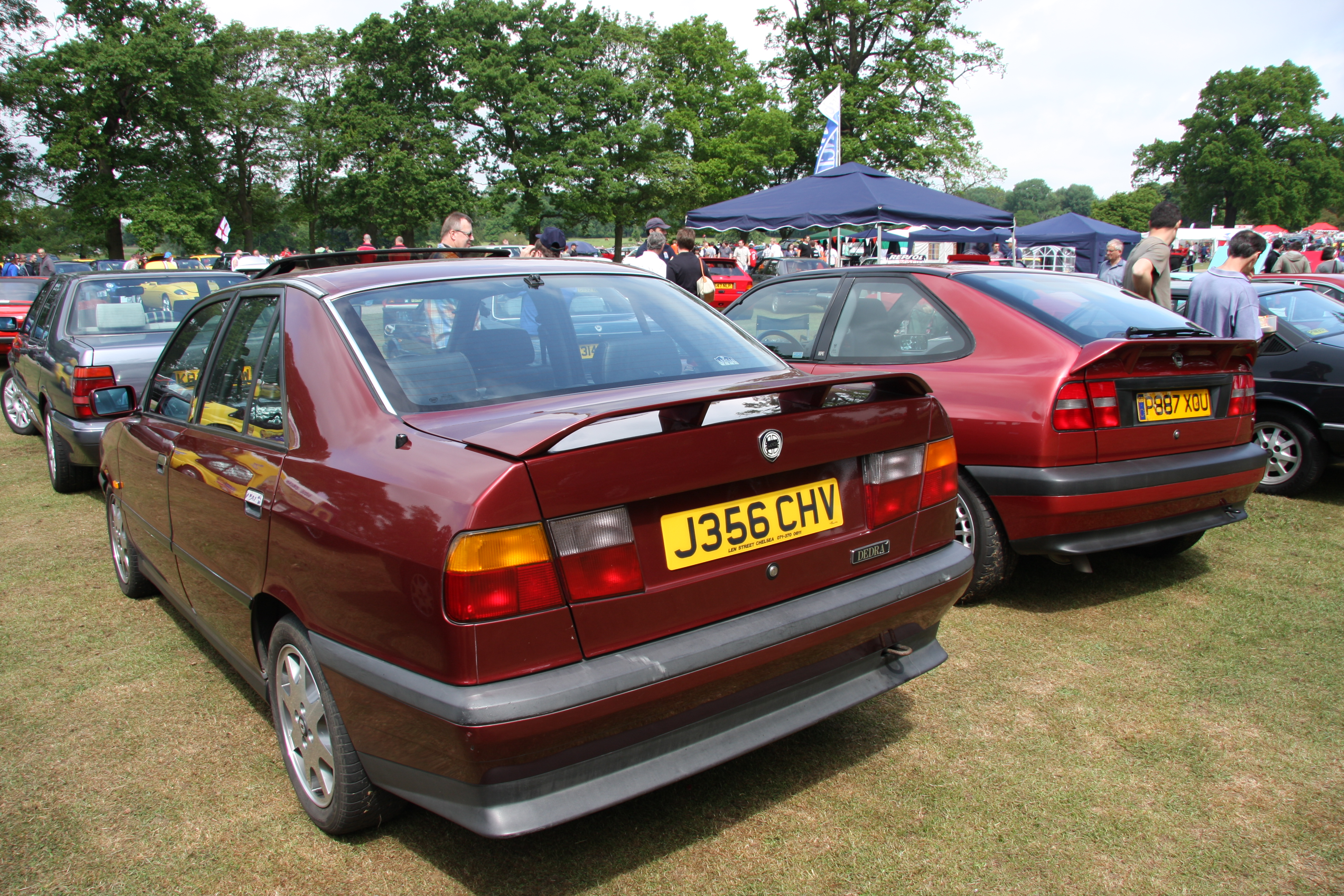
Pre-facelift Lancia Dedra Berlina rear

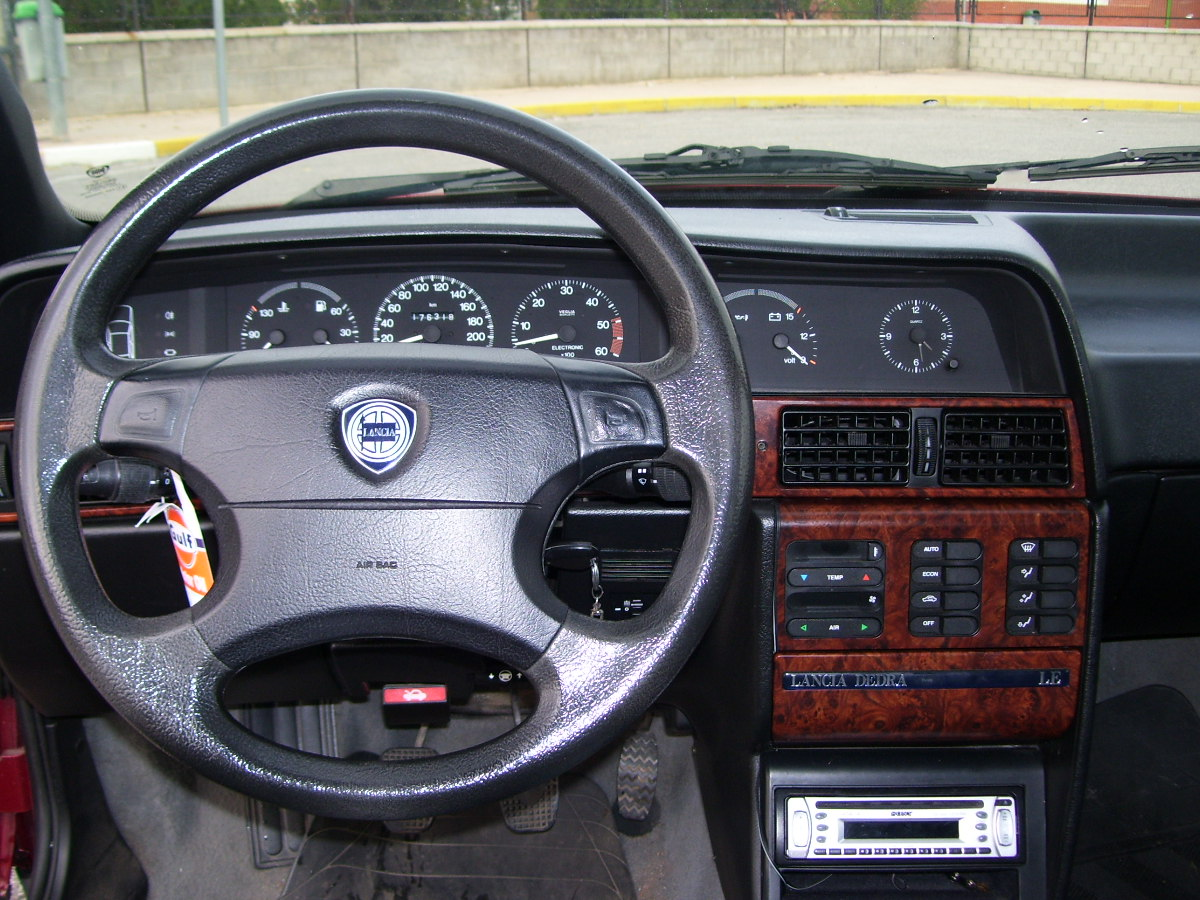
Dashboard of first facelift

In 1991, a performance focused variant called the Dedra Integrale was launched. It used a similar engine and transmission to the Delta Integrale 8v. The engine was touted at the time as one of the world's most competition proven units. It is a 2-litre four-cylinder fuel injected twin cam engine, fitted with contra-rotating balancing shafts, a Garrett T3 turbocharger and an associated inter-cooler to aid volumetric efficiency that boosts power output to 169 PS (167 hp; 124 kW) in the catalyzed version. The Dedra Integrale was also fitted with the new Visco Drive 2000 traction control system, as well as the electronically controlled suspension which was available as option in the 2.0 and upper models. The equipment was largely equivalent to that of the Dedra LX, with some modifications such as more bolstered seats and a sporty steering wheel. The Integrale retained a front-wheel bias, with 56 percent of the power going to the front axle. The Integrale was equipped with a standard rear spoiler for improved high-speed stability.

A front-wheel drive model with a turbocharged engine called the Dedra 2000 turbo was released simultaneously with the Integrale; it had slightly less power so as to not overwhelm the chassis. This model also benefitted from the Visco Drive 2000 system, a necessity to avoid wheelspin. Aside from being lighter, the model was also somewhat lower. The Integrale's spoiler was an option on the turbo.

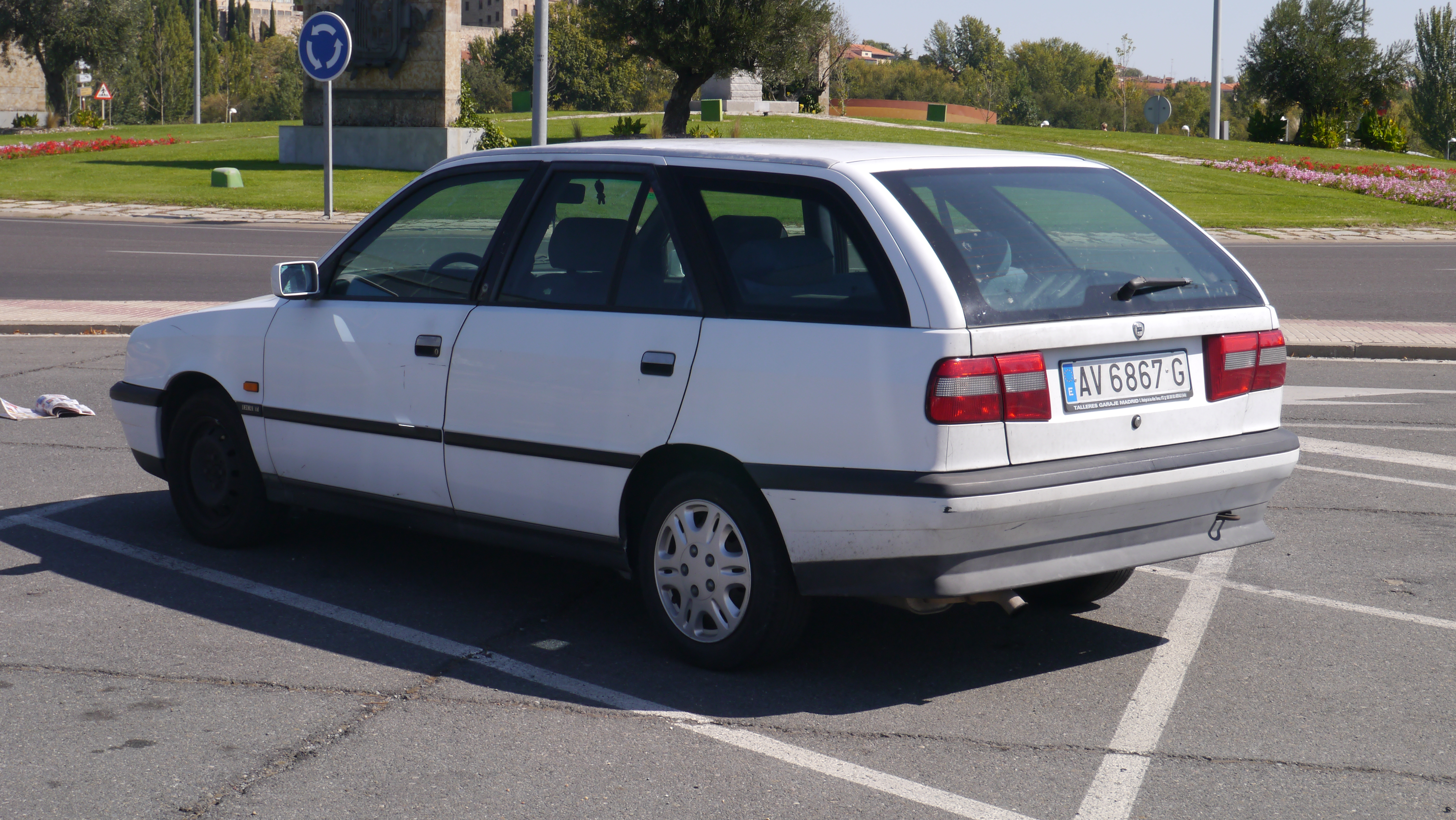
Rear of a Lancia Dedra SW 1.6

When the Dedra was launched, it was a good time for Lancia: The Thema had been facelifted a year earlier, and despite being on the market for five years was selling well, the Delta launched initially in 1979, due to its continued success in rally competition was living a second youth, and the Y10 had a slight restyling and good sales. However, the Dedra was not a strong success outside Italy. A major facelift in 1993 did little to boost the car's sales success and the whole Lancia range including the Dedra was withdrawn from right hand drive markets a year later. From 1994 the car was also sold as a station wagon, developed by French coachbuilders Heuliez. The Dedra remained reasonably popular in the Italian market until it was replaced by the all-new Lybra in 1999.

A total of 418,150 Dedra saloons and 44,488 Dedra station wagons were manufactured during its production run.

=== Summary ===
- January 1989: Start of production
- April 1989: Official launch of the 1.6 L, 1.8 L, 2.0 L, and 1.9 L tds models.
- May 1991: Launch of the Integrale and 2000 turbo models.
- May 1992: Launch of the automatic transmission for the range.
- October 1992: First facelift.
- January 1993: Enhancement of security equipment.
- July 1994: Addition of new engines, introduction of the station wagon body style, and other minor enhancements.
- January 1995: Further enhancement of security equipment with the launch of the anti-theft device.
- November 1995: Second facelift.
- February 1996: Replacement of the 2.0 L engine with the 1.8 L 16 V.
- January 1997: Launch of the facelifted Integrale with the 2.0 L 16 V engine.
- May 1997: Updates to the interior.
- July 1997: Introduction of a new 1.8 L 113 PS (83 kW; 111 hp) engine.
- December 1997: Third facelift with new engines, updates to the new front-end design, new doors and other minor enhancements.
- January 2000: End of production.

== Model year changes ==
The Dedra had some revisions made during its production run. The first revision was in 1992 which introduced revisions to the engines, updates to the features and introducing the turbo and Integrale models. The second revision was between 1994 and 1998, which featured the introduction of the Station Wagon body style and the DOHC 16V engine.

=== Phase one (1992) ===
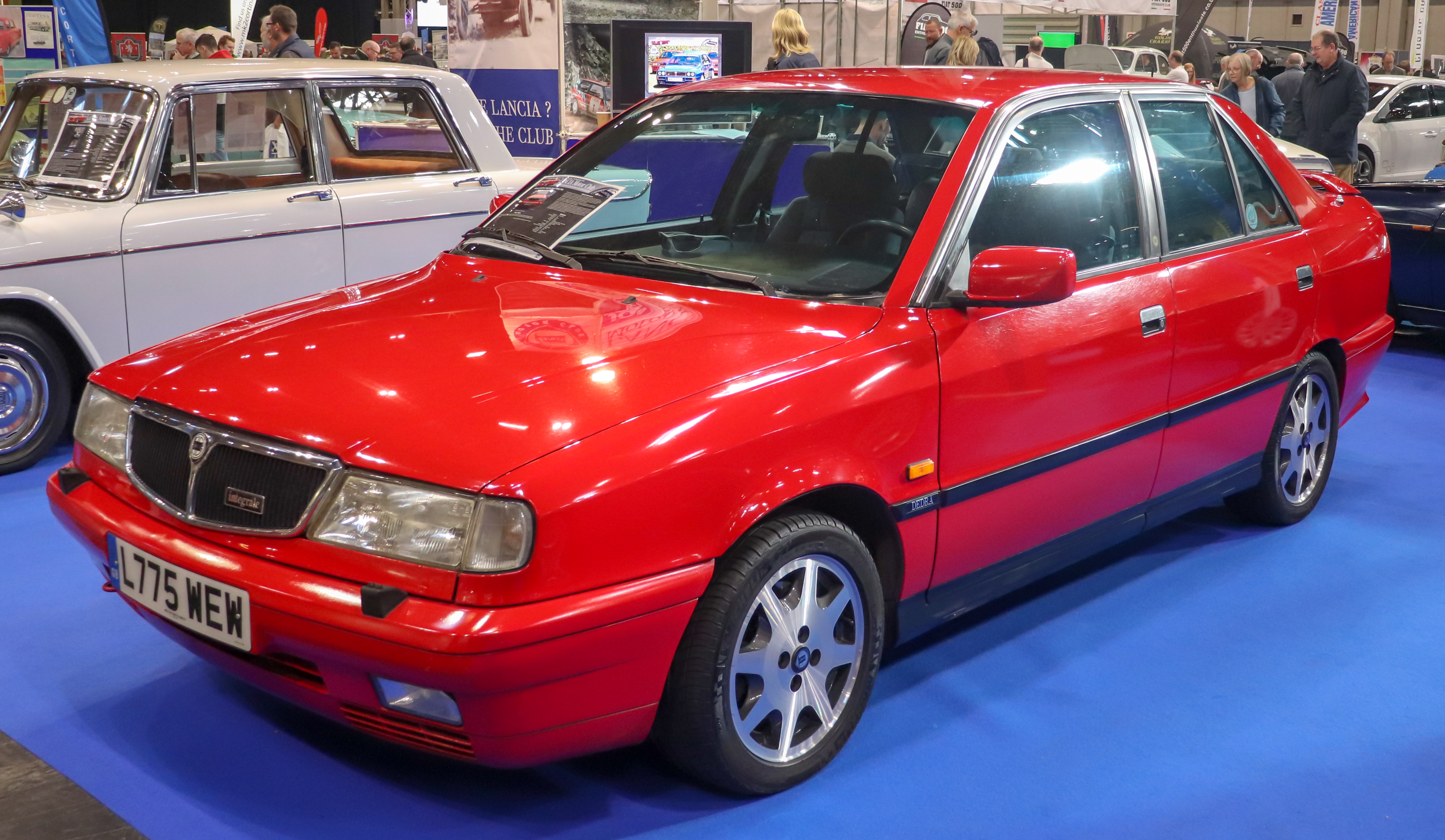
Dedra Integrale

- Dedra 1.6 ie 8V - 90 PS (89 hp; 66 kW)
- Dedra 1.6 ie cat - 76 PS (75 hp; 56 kW)
- Dedra 1.8 ie cat - 107 PS (106 hp; 79 kW)
- Dedra 2.0 ie cat - 115 PS (113 hp; 85 kW)
- Dedra 2.0 ie Automatic - 115 PS (113 hp; 85 kW) (4-speed)
- Dedra 2.0 Turbo 8v HF - 165 PS (163 hp; 121 kW) (FWD)
- Dedra 2.0 Turbo 8v HF Integrale - 180 PS (178 hp; 132 kW)
- Dedra 1.9 Turbo DS cat - 90 PS (89 hp; 66 kW)

=== Phase two (1994) (facelift) ===
- Dedra 1.6 8V MPI - 90 PS (89 hp; 66 kW)
- Dedra 1.8 16V - 108 PS (107 hp; 79 kW)
- Dedra 2.0 16V - 139 PS (137 hp; 102 kW)
- Dedra 2.0 16V Integrale - 139 PS (137 hp; 102 kW)

Three years later, the HF versions were replaced by atmospheric 16V engines.

=== Phase three (1996–1998) ===
- Dedra 1.8 16v 113 PS (111 hp; 83 kW) (1996). This engine was also used in Fiat Bravo.
- Dedra 1.8 16v VVT 131 PS (129 hp; 96 kW) (1996). Replaced the 2.0 16v.
- Dedra 1.6 16v 103 PS (102 hp; 76 kW) (1998). This engine was also used in Fiat Bravo.

Engine	Displacement	Power	Torque	Top speed	0–100 km/h (0–62 mph)	Years
Petrol engines
1.6 i.e.	1,581 cc (96.5 cu in)	90 PS (66 kW; 89 hp)	128 N⋅m (94 lb⋅ft)	180 km/h (112 mph)	13.4 s	1989–1998
1.6 16v	1,581 cc (96.5 cu in)	103 PS (76 kW; 102 hp)	145 N⋅m (107 lb⋅ft)	186 km/h (116 mph)		1998–1999
1.8 i.e. bialbero	1,756 cc (107.2 cu in)	109 PS (80 kW; 108 hp)	142 N⋅m (105 lb⋅ft)	187 km/h (116 mph)	12.5 s	1989–1994
1.8 16v	1,747 cc (106.6 cu in)	113 PS (83 kW; 111 hp)	157 N⋅m (116 lb⋅ft)	195 km/h (121 mph)	10.3 s	1996–1997
1.8 16v V.V.T.	1,747 cc (106.6 cu in)	131 PS (96 kW; 129 hp)	167 N⋅m (123 lb⋅ft)	203 km/h (126 mph)	10.0 s	1996–1999
2.0 i.e.	1,995 cc (121.7 cu in)	117 PS (86 kW; 115 hp); Cat. 113 PS (83 kW; 111 hp)	162 N⋅m (119 lb⋅ft); Cat. 156 N⋅m (115 lb⋅ft)	195 km/h (121 mph)	9.8 s	1989–1994
2.0 16v	1,995 cc (121.7 cu in)	139 PS (102 kW; 137 hp)	185 N⋅m (136 lb⋅ft)	210 km/h (130 mph)	9.4 s	1994–1996
2.0 16v Integrale	1,995 cc (121.7 cu in)	139 PS (102 kW; 137 hp)	185 N⋅m (136 lb⋅ft)	195 km/h (121 mph)		1994–1997
2.0 turbo	1,995 cc (121.7 cu in)	165 PS (121 kW; 163 hp); Cat. 162 PS (119 kW; 160 hp)	285 N⋅m (210 lb⋅ft)	215 km/h (134 mph)	8.3 s	1991–1994
Integrale	1,995 cc (121.7 cu in)	180 PS (132 kW; 178 hp); Cat. 169 PS (124 kW; 167 hp)	275 N⋅m (203 lb⋅ft)	215 km/h (134 mph)	6.9 s	1991–1994
Diesel engines
2.0 tds	1,929 cc (117.7 cu in)	92 PS (68 kW; 91 hp)	194 N⋅m (143 lb⋅ft)	187 km/h (116 mph)	12.9 s	1989–1993
2.0 TD cat.	1,929 cc (117.7 cu in)	90 PS (66 kW; 89 hp)	186 N⋅m (137 lb⋅ft)	184 km/h (114 mph)	12.9 s	1993–1999

== Reception ==
In October 2013, Top Gear magazine placed the Dedra on its list of "The 13 worst cars of the last 20 years.", the main reason being the car being a depiction of the loss of spirit in Lancia cars after the takeover by Fiat.

== Concept cars ==
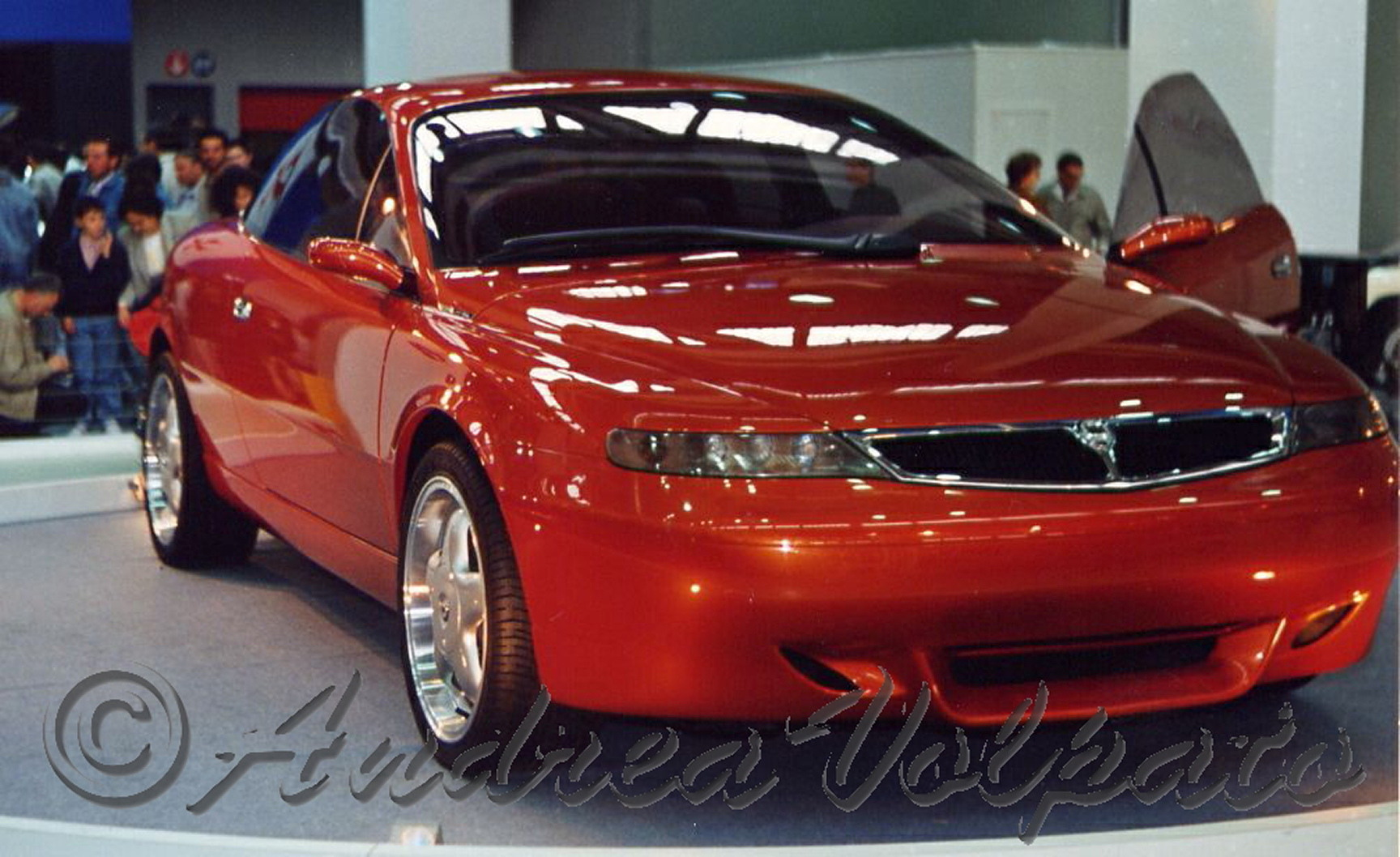
IAD Magia

In 1992, IAD Studio presented its Magia prototype based on a Dedra Integrale rolling chassis. It was a four-seat coupé that was finished in bright orange and had a distinctive wedge shape that combined soft lines and aggressive details. It was designed by Michael Ani and Chris Garfield of IAD.
