= Fiat C-platform =

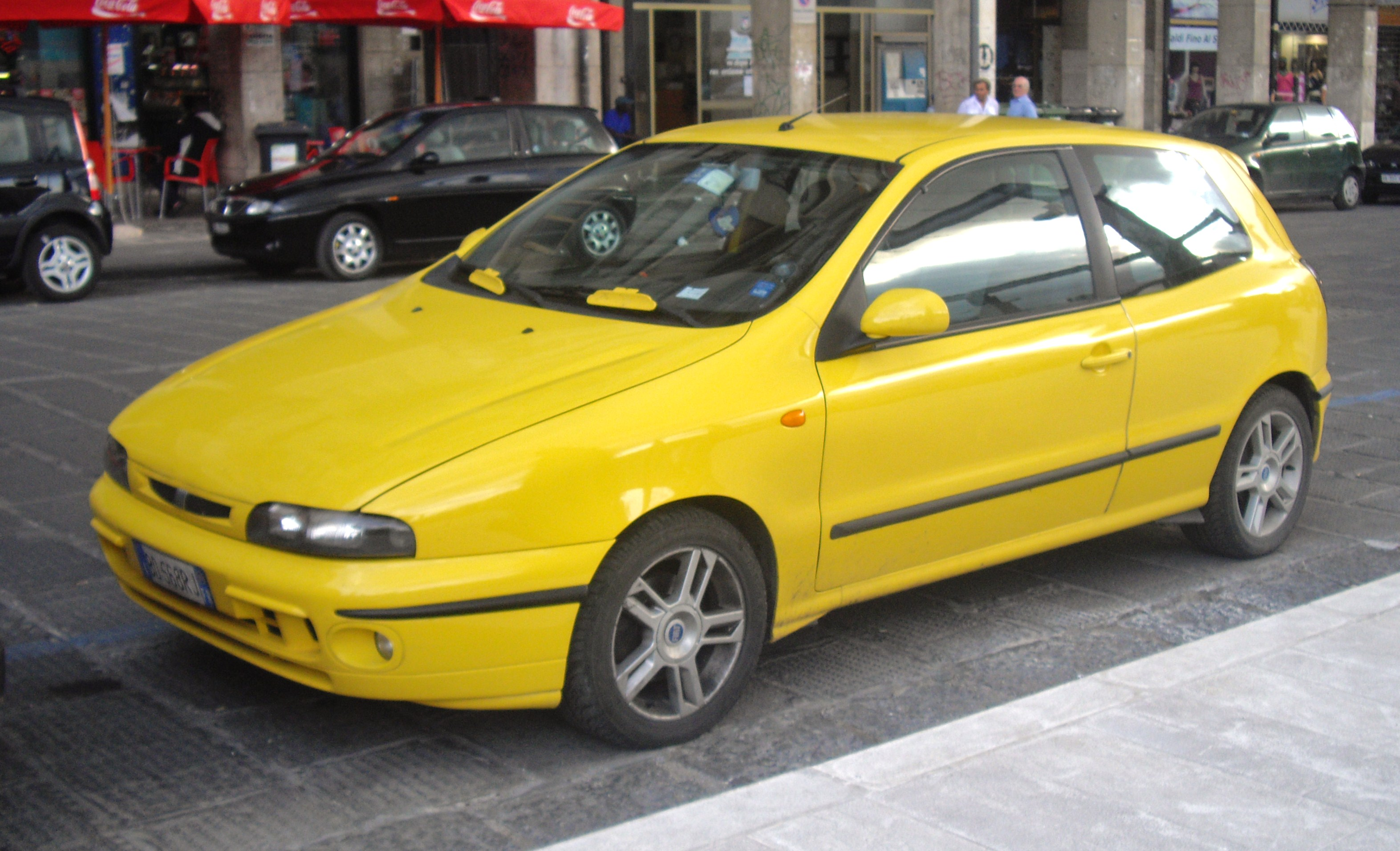
- Fiat Bravo (first generation) (C1-platform)

Overview
- Manufacturer: Fiat Group
- Also called: C1: Type Two rev. 2 Type Two rev. 3
- Production: First generation: 1995-2010; Second generation: 2001–2014

Body and chassis
- Class: Small family car platform
- Layout: Front-engine, front-wheel drive, all-wheel drive (C1); Front-engine, front-wheel drive (C2)
- Vehicles: First generation: Fiat Bravo; Fiat Brava; Fiat Marea; Fiat Multipla; Alfa Romeo 156; Lancia Lybra; Alfa Romeo 147; Alfa Romeo GT; Second generation: Fiat Stilo; Fiat Bravo; Lancia Delta

Chronology
- Predecessor: Tipo Due and Tipo Tre platforms
- Successor: Fiat Compact platform

The Fiat C-platform was an automobile platform used in small family cars of the Fiat Group. The predecessors of the C-platform were the Tipo Tre and Tipo Due platforms, and the successor is the new Compact platform which debuted in Alfa Romeo Giulietta in 2010.

== First generation (C1) ==
The first generation C-platform was no more of a lightly developed Type Two platform: it retained almost all of its structure (including the wheelbase in most models) and components, including the suspension layout, albeit with some revisions. It is also called "Type Two rev. 2". As in the Type Two platform, the suspension is independent all-around, composed of MacPherson struts at the front and trailing arms at the rear. The first models to use this platform were the Fiat Bravo and Fiat Brava, followed by the Fiat Marea. The Fiat Multipla is built on the sandwich version of this platform.

In 1998, a completely revised version of the body was proposed with the debut of the Fiat Multipla, dubbed the "C1 Sandwich," characterized by a wider, more boxy floor structure. It substantially adopted the reinforced suspension of the Brava.

For the active safety of the Multipla's three front passengers, in the event of a severe frontal impact, the engine could not be displaced into the passenger compartment, but would slide underneath.

Engines could be gasoline, diesel, or dual-fuel, with displacements up to 2.5 liters (153 cu in) and five-cylinder in-line engines, mated to a 6-speed manual transmission.

The Alfa Romeo 156 and Lancia Lybra used a development of the C1 platform, called "Type Two rev. 3", with an extended wheelbase and a different suspension setup: double wishbones at the front and MacPherson struts at the rear for the Alfa; MacPherson struts at the front and BLG ("Bracci Longitudinali Guidati", translating to "Guided Longitudinal Arms") multilink rear suspension for the Lancia. The Alfa Romeo 147 and Alfa Romeo GT were derived from the 156 floorpan and retained its suspension setup. Estate versions of 156 and Lybra were also available with Boge-Nivomat self-levelling hydropneumatic rear suspension. Alfa 156, with its Sportwagon Q4 and Crosswagon Q4, is the only C-platform based car with all-wheel drive.

The Lancia Lybra chassis was revised, both for a longer wheelbase and for the adoption of a different rear suspension (BLG, "Longitudinal Guided Arms") and for some reinforcements to the front structure (interventions that were also incorporated into the second series of the Marea in 1999), which became known as Type Two rev. 3.

The chassis of the Alfa Romeo 156, 147, and GT were also derived from it, with more significant modifications, adopting higher-performance suspensions: a high quadrilateral front suspension and a three-link rear suspension inspired by the Lancia Delta HF Integrale, similar to the MacPherson strut. The front structure was also revised to improve impact absorption..

=== Vehicles based on Fiat C1 platform ===
- 1995 Fiat Brava
- 1995 Fiat Bravo
- 1996 Fiat Marea
- 1998 Fiat Multipla
- 1996 Alfa Romeo 156
- 1998 Lancia Lybra
- 2000 Alfa Romeo 147
- 2003 Alfa Romeo GT
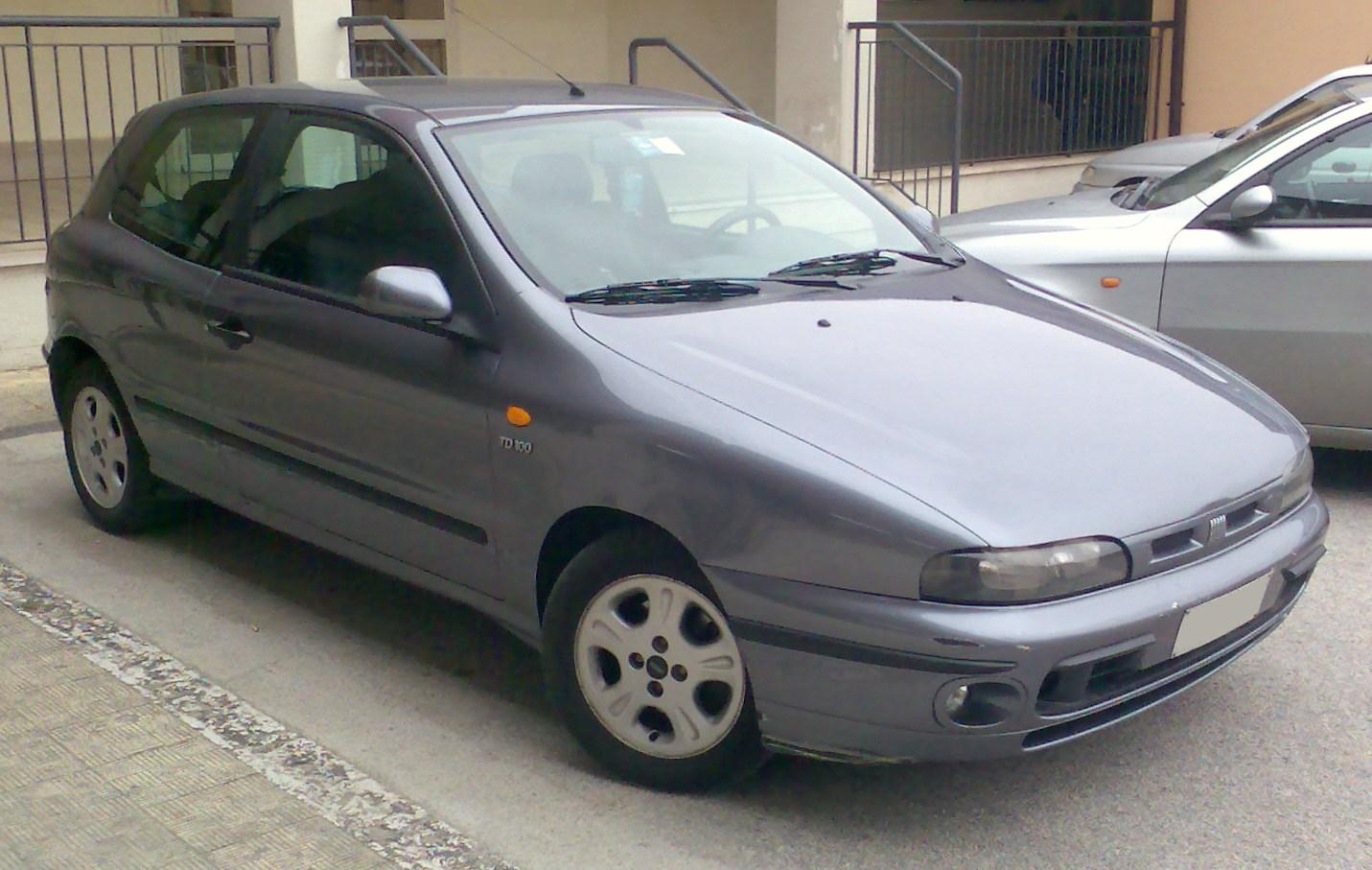
Fiat Bravo

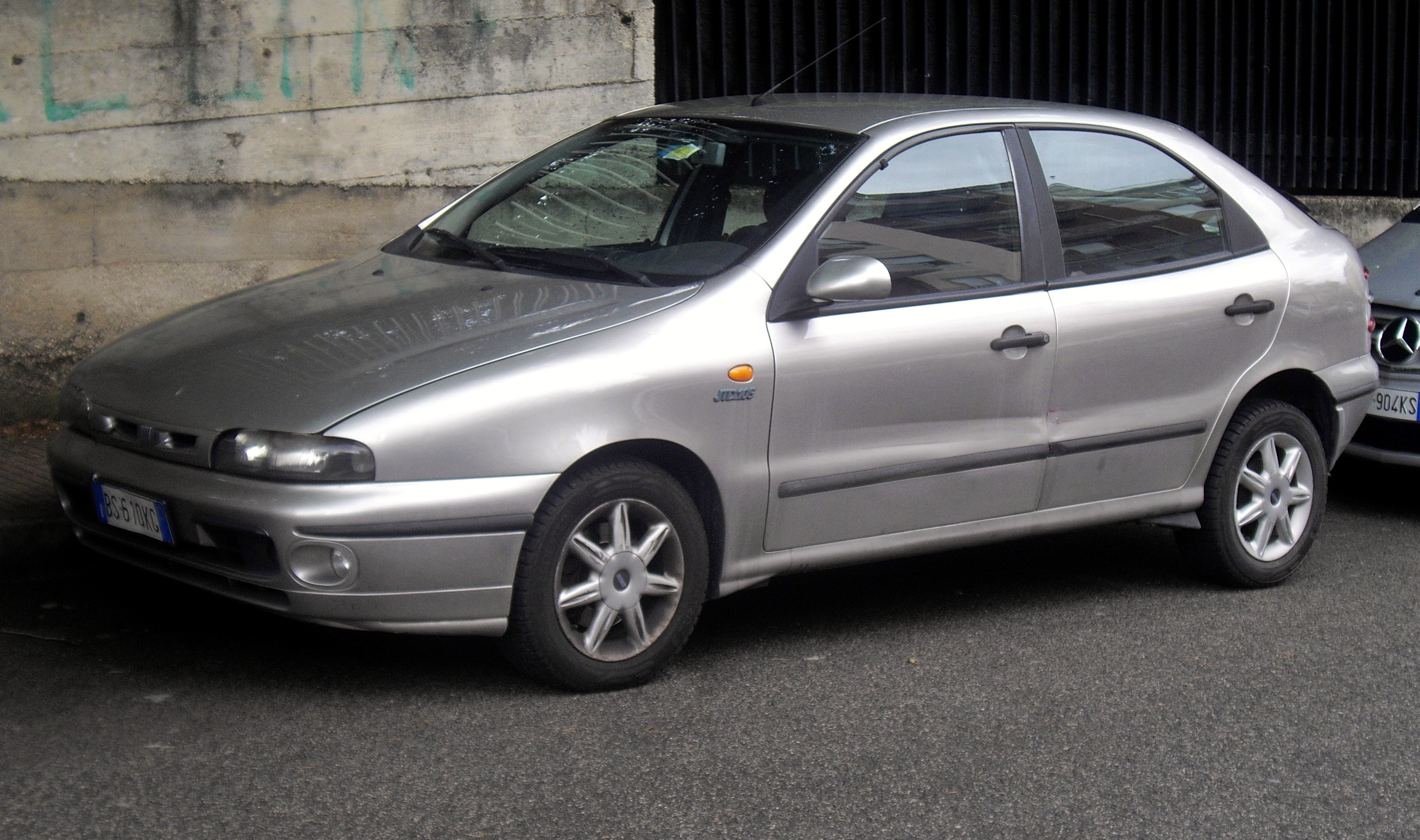
Fiat Brava

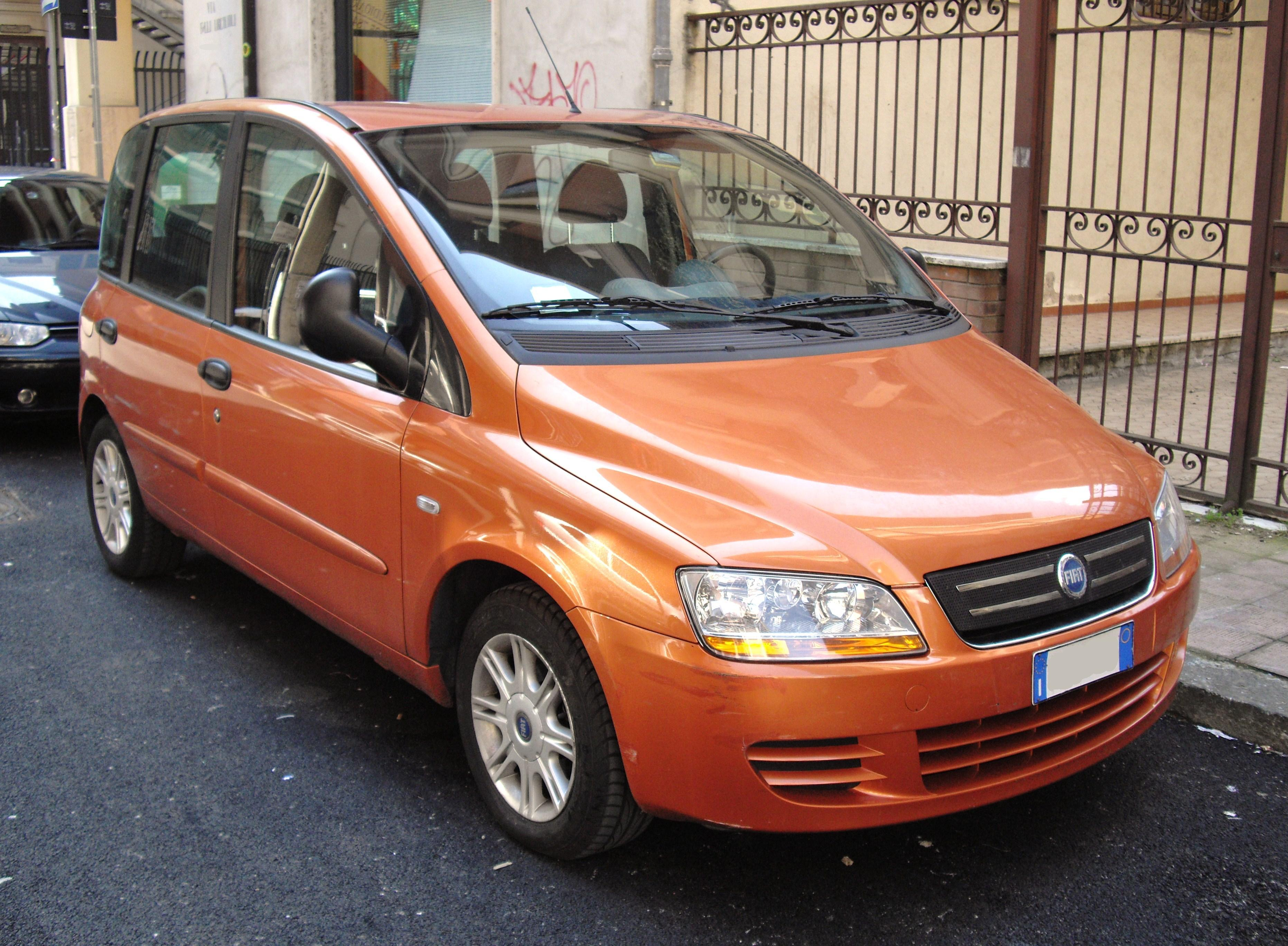
Fiat Multipla

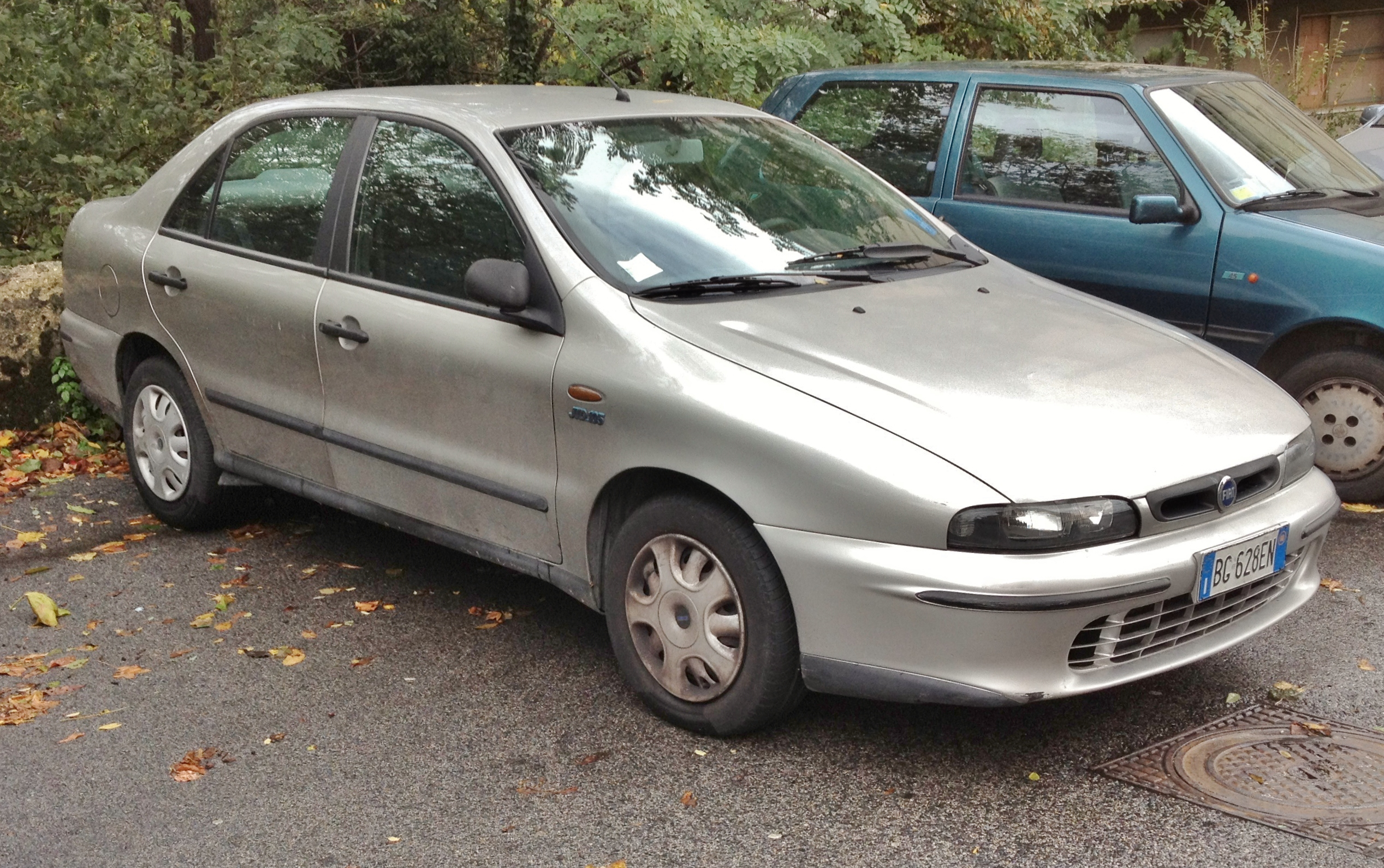
Fiat Marea

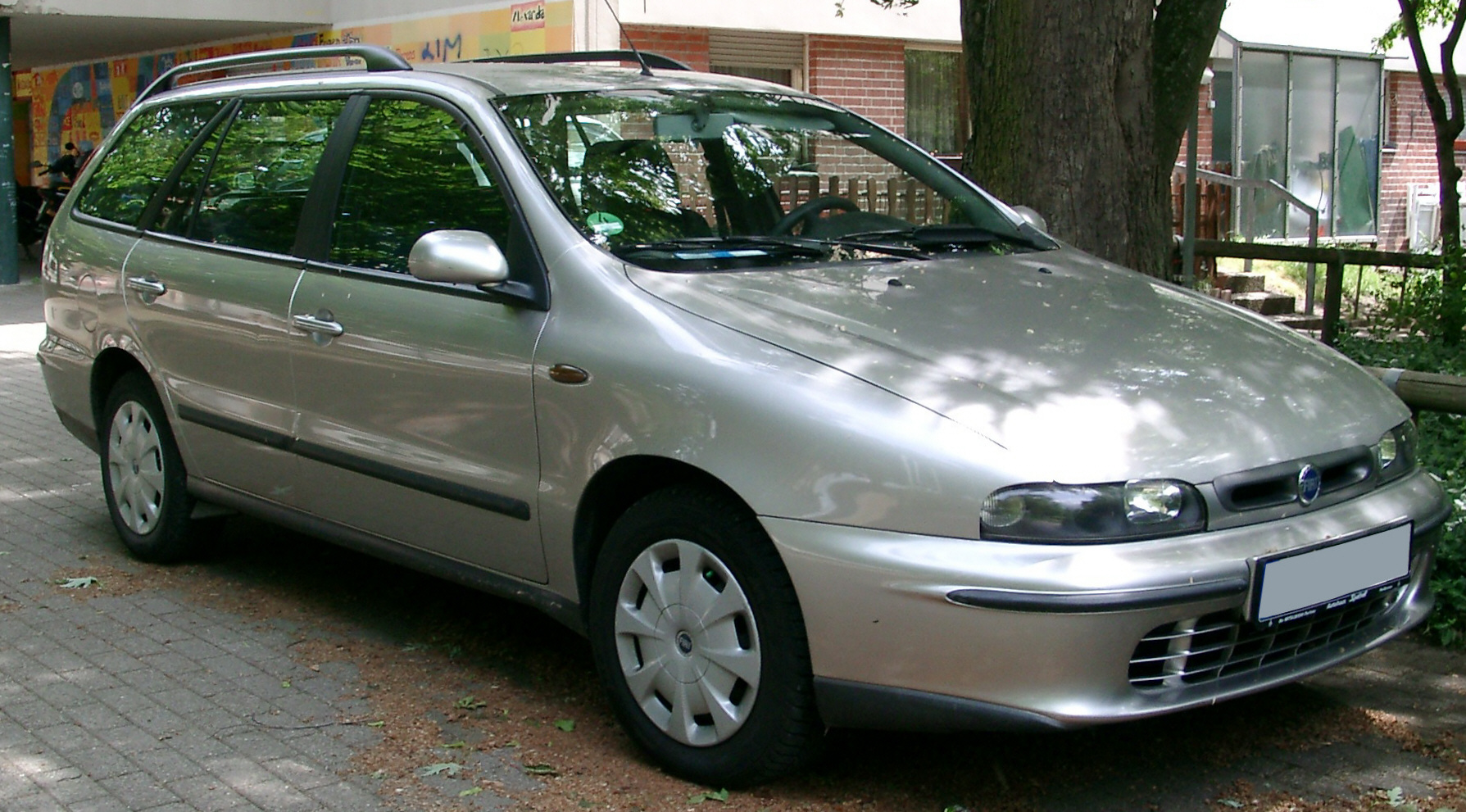
Fiat Marea Weekend

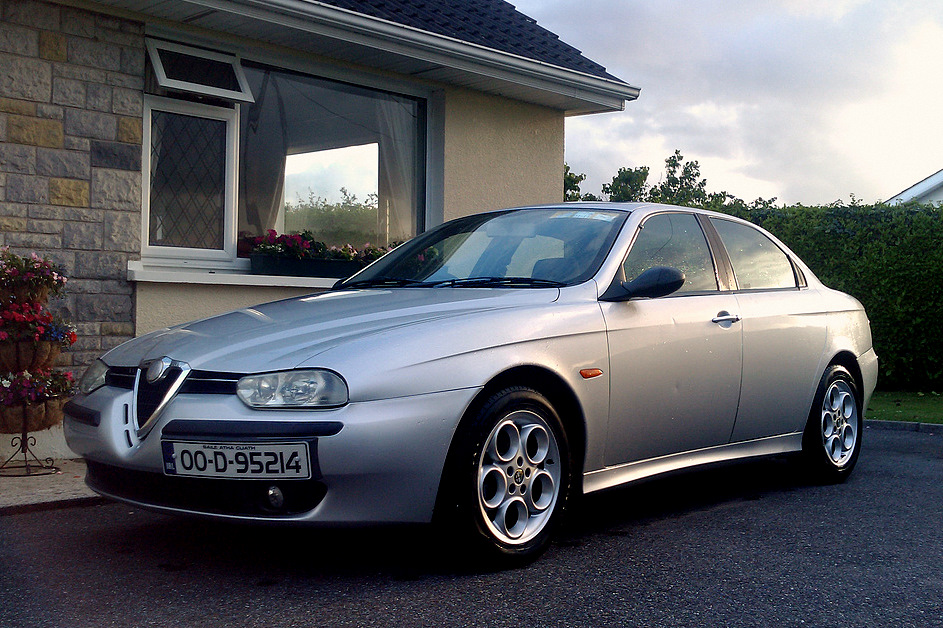
Alfa Romeo 156

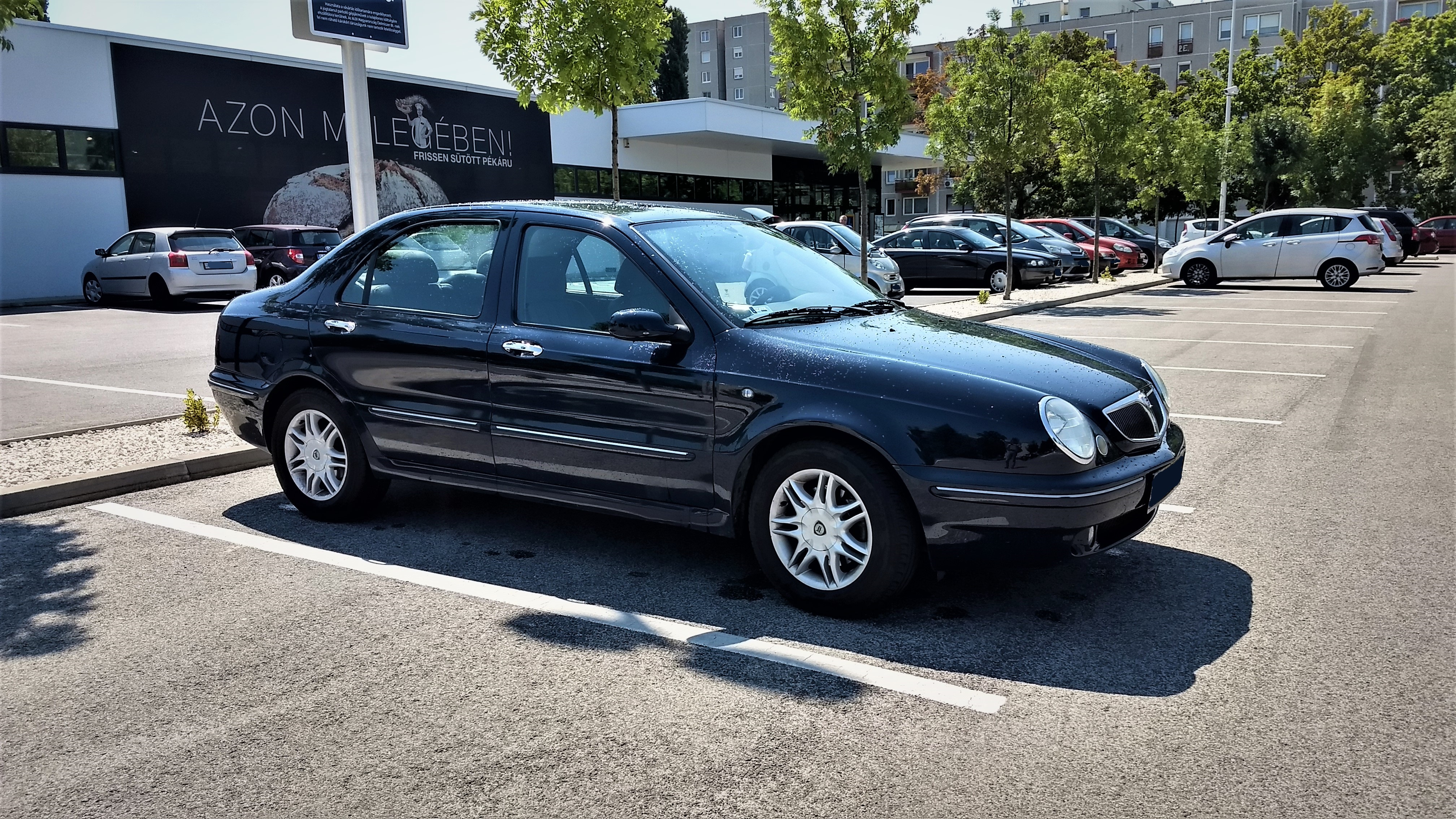
Lancia Lybra

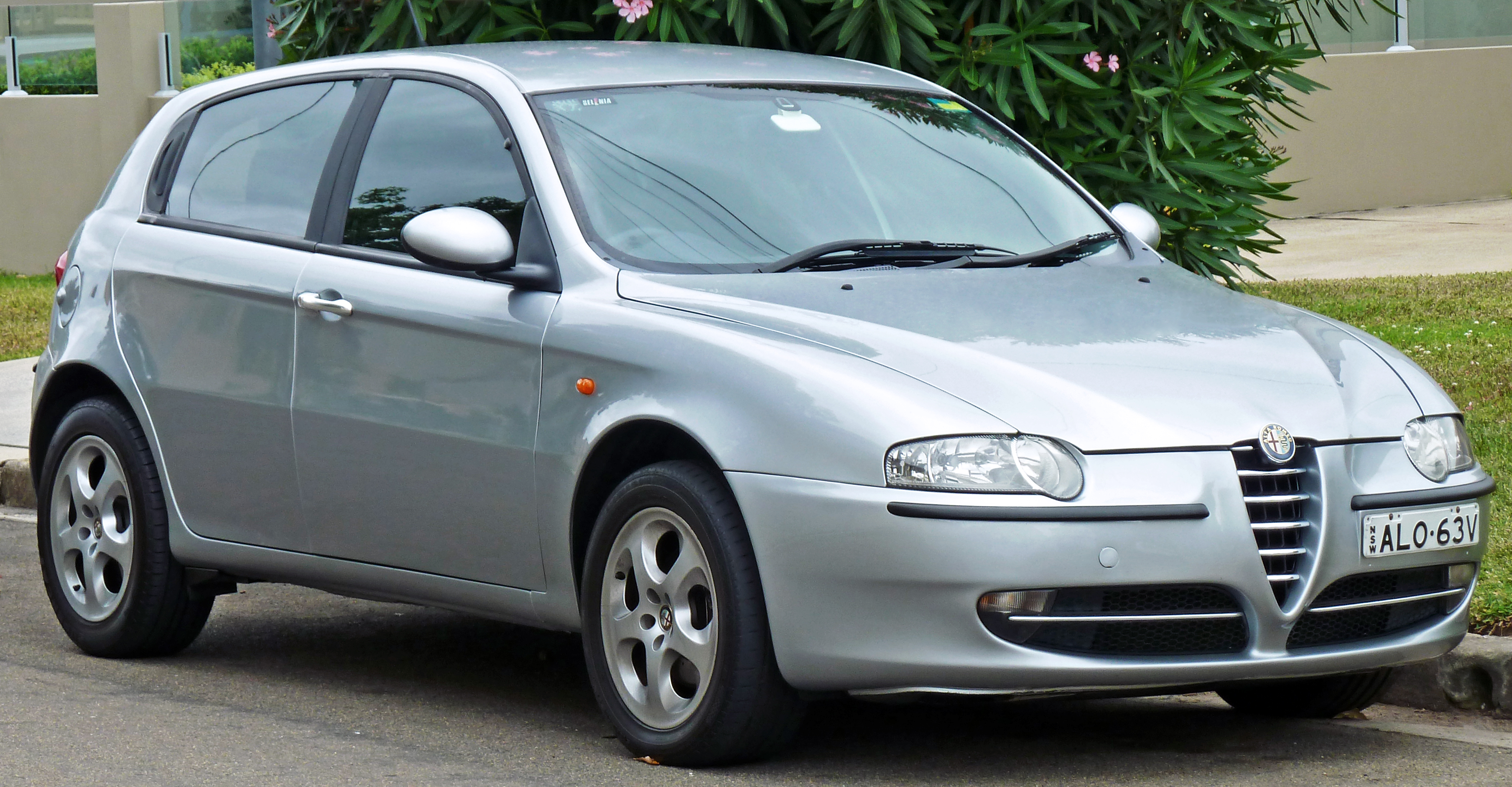
Alfa Romeo 147

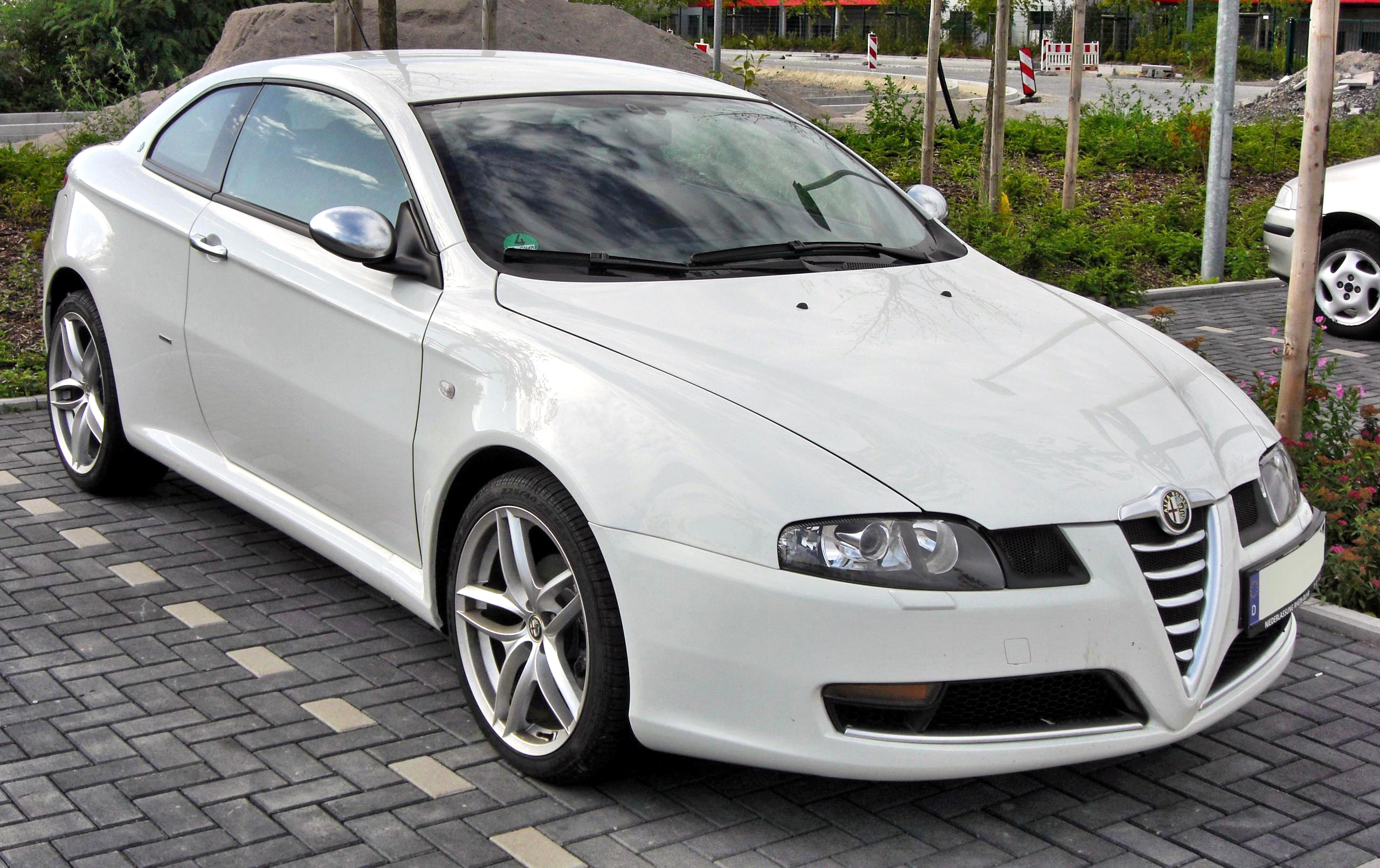
Alfa Romeo GT

== Second generation (C2) ==
The second generation C-platform was jointly designed by global team of Fiat engineers and small number of Lancia engineers in Fiat development center in Mirafiori, also engineers in Betim, Brazil took part of the development. This all-new chassis uses MacPherson strut front suspension and torsion beam rear suspension.

The first model to use this platform was the Fiat Stilo. Between 2007 and 2008 the C-platform was used by the new Fiat Bravo and the new third generation Lancia Delta with longer wheelbase. The C-platform was built in Cassino (Italy) and Betim to be used for the Brazilian versions of Stilo.

The C-platform supports many of Fiat engines from 1.2 FIRE petrol to 1.9 diesel MultiJet TwinTurbo.

The second generation (C2) debuted in 2001 with the Fiat Stilo. The first developments of the completely new platform compared to the C1 began at least three years earlier to create a highly flexible structure that could adapt to numerous types of vehicles, from compact mid-size cars to station wagons and even premium mid-size cars such as the third series of the Lancia Delta launched in 2008. The suspension layout uses MacPherson struts at the front and a torsion beam at the rear to ensure maximum reliability and good comfort combined with a large boot (the torsion beam is a very compact solution) and lower production costs compared to more complex structures.

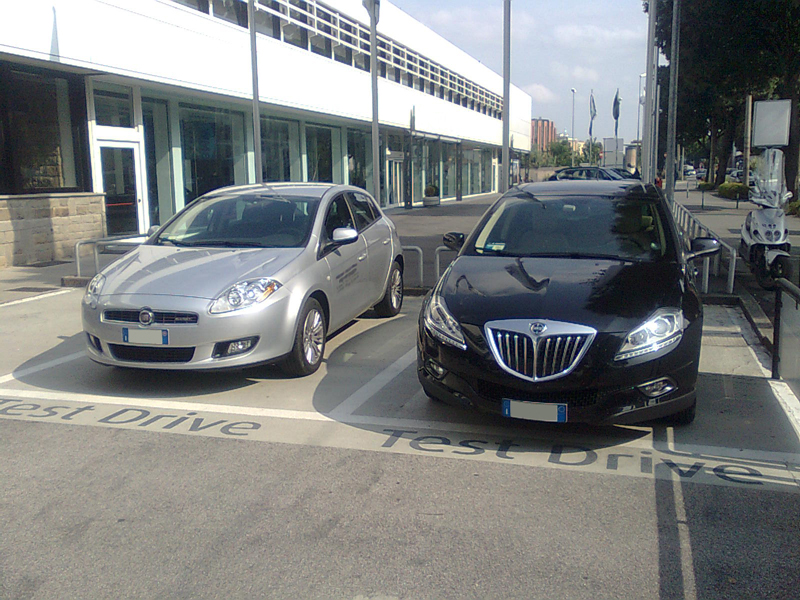
The Lancia Delta and Fiat Bravo shares the C2 platform

The C2, in addition to being much more rigid, met the standards required by Euro NCAP crash tests, achieving 4 to 5 stars for the latest cars. The engine is transversely mounted and the car is front-wheel drive. This platform is paired with 5- and 6-speed manual transmissions and Dualogic or Selespeed robotized automatic transmissions.

The engines paired with this chassis were mainly the 1.9 Multijet engines, followed by the 1.4 FIRE and T-Jet, the 1.6 and 1.8 16V produced by FMA in Pratola Serra, the 2.4 5-cylinder 20-valve and the more recent 1.8 T-Jet direct injection and the 1.6 and 2.0 Multijet diesels. In 2008, for the first time it was possible to homologate the 1.9 Twin Stage bi-turbodiesel engine with 190 horsepower and 400 N m of maximum torque without making further modifications to the structure as the chassis easily handled the enormous torque of the Multijet. The C2 was assembled at the Fiat plant in Cassino.

=== Vehicles based on Fiat C2 platform ===
- 2001 Fiat Stilo (short wheelbase)
- 2002 Fiat Stilo Multiwagon (short wheelbase)
- 2007 Fiat Bravo (short wheelbase)
- 2008 Lancia Delta (844, long wheelbase)
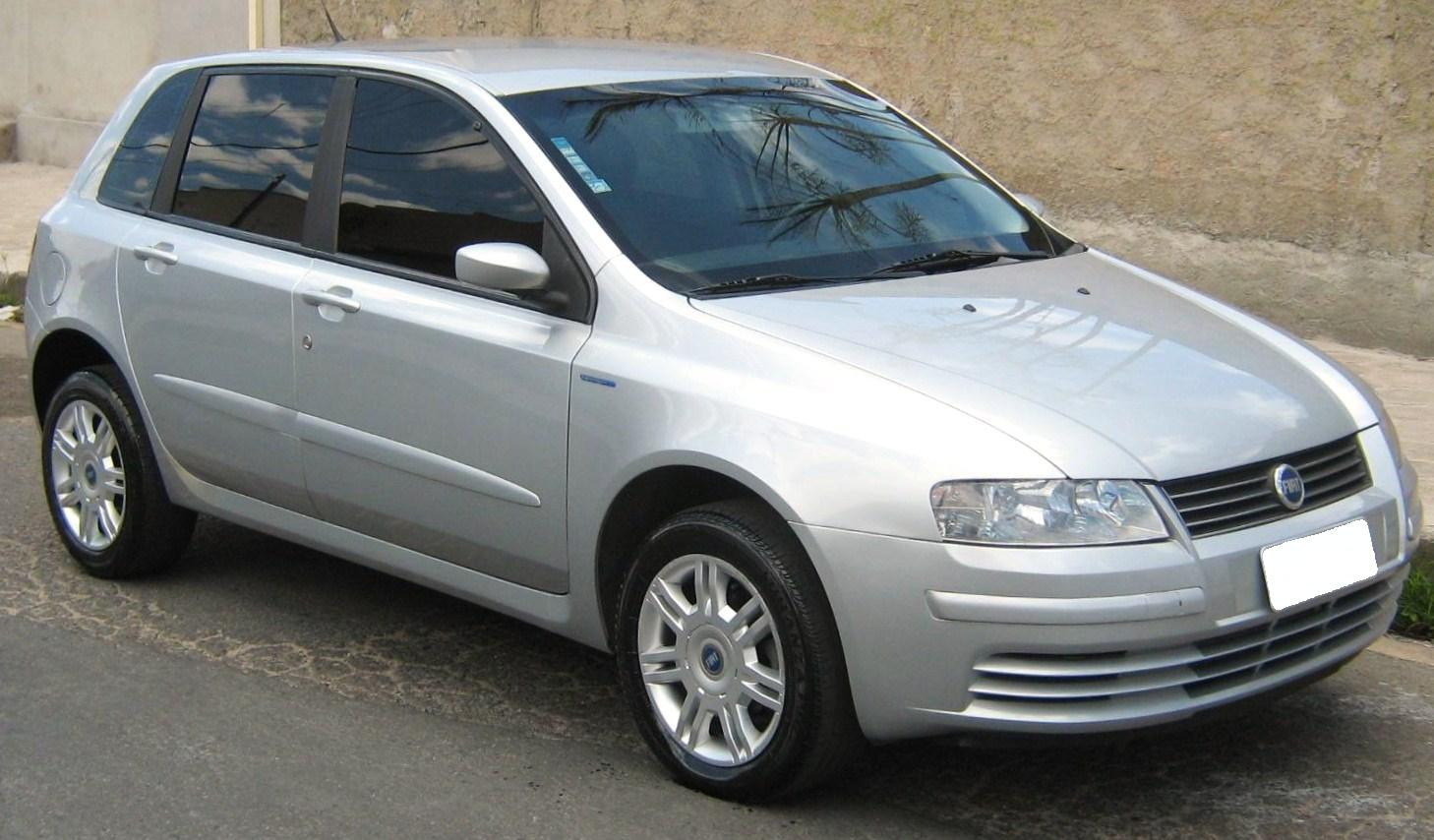
Fiat Stilo

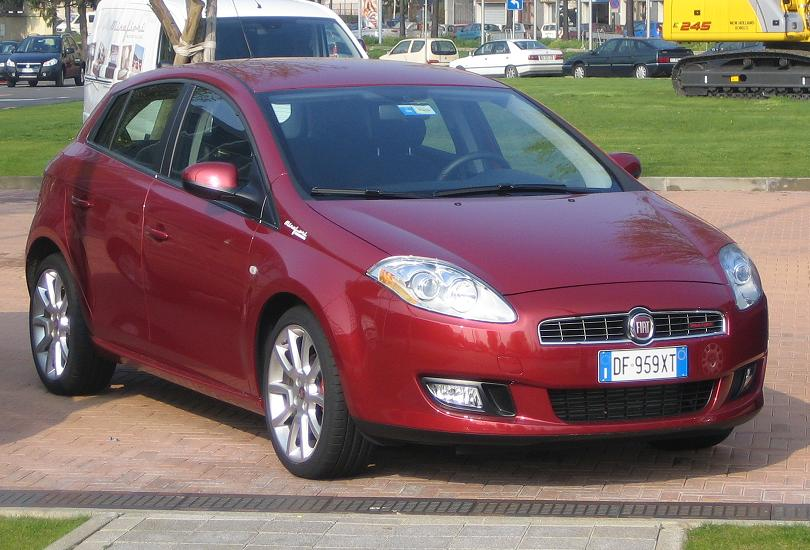
Fiat Bravo

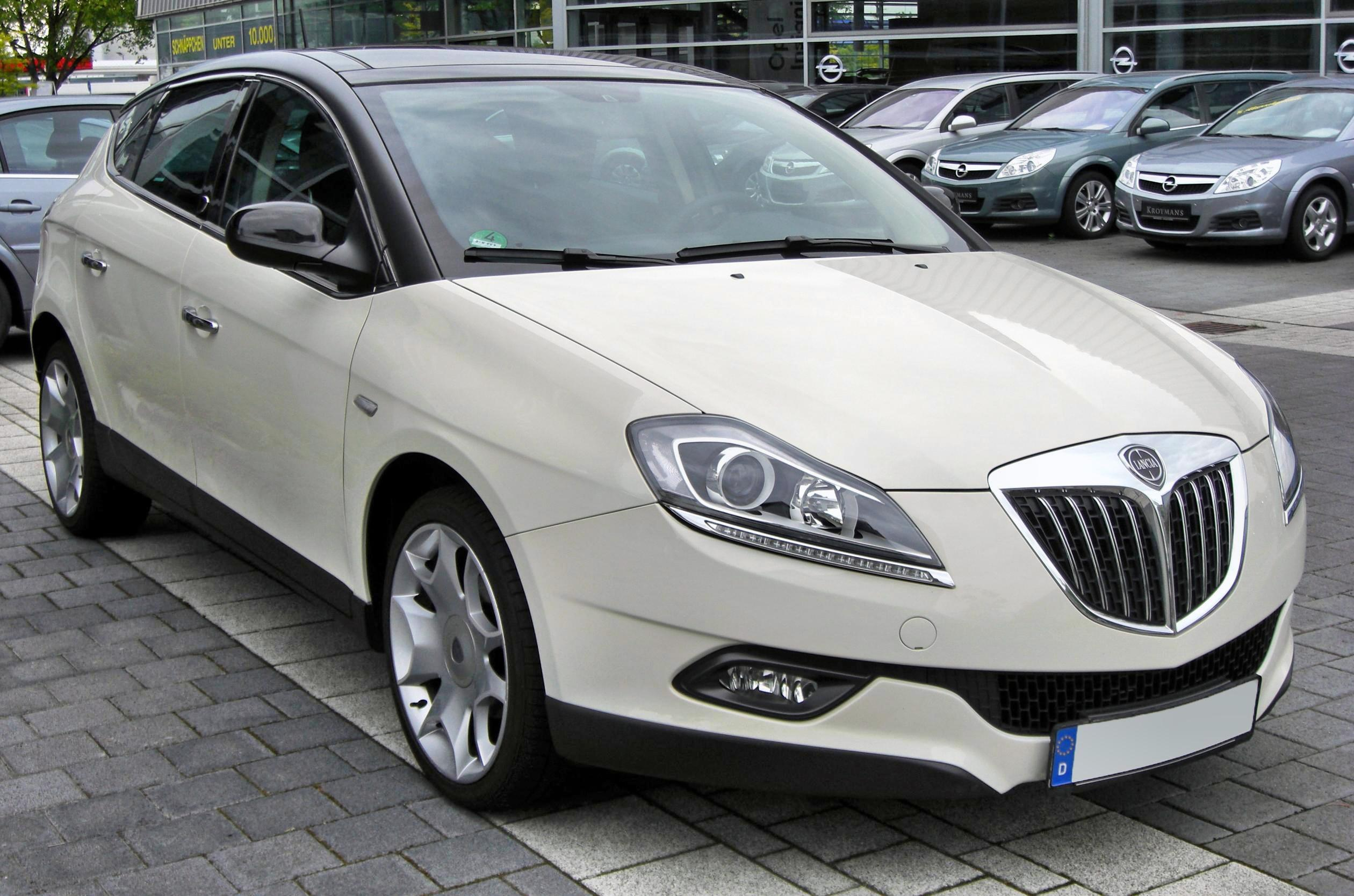
Lancia Delta
