= Alfa Romeo Sportut =

Concept car designed by Bertone

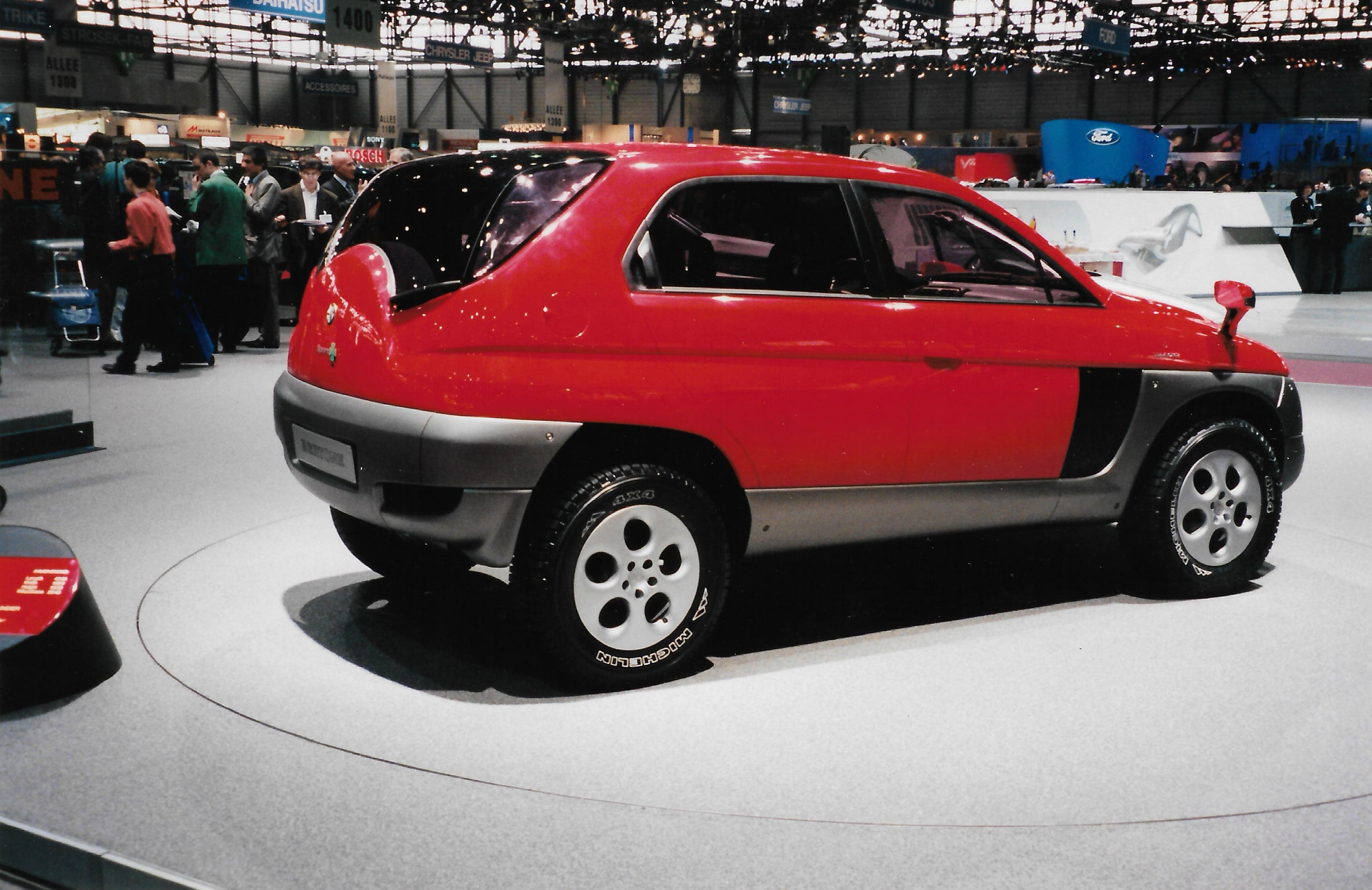

Overview
- Manufacturer: Alfa Romeo
- Also called: Bertone Sportut
- Production: 1997
- Designer: Luciano D'Ambrosio at Bertone

Body and chassis
- Class: Concept car
- Body style: 5-door SUV
- Layout: Front-engine all-wheel drive
- Platform: Type Two (Tipo Due)
- Related: Alfa Romeo 145

Powertrain
- Engine: 2.0 L Twin Spark inline-4
- Transmission: 5-speed manual

Dimensions
- Length: 4,110 mm (162 in)
- Width: 1,810 mm (71 in)
- Height: 1,640 mm (65 in)

The Alfa Romeo Sportut is a concept car designed by Bertone for the Italian automobile manufacturer Alfa Romeo. It was based on an Alfa Romeo 145 platform and first shown at the 1997 Geneva Motor Show, as a non-moving styling exercise.

The vehicle's body style is a five-door SUV, with hidden rear door-handles like the Alfa Romeo 156.

== Technical Specifications ==
- Engine: 4 cylinders in-line, 4 valves per cylinder, Twin Spark
- Configuration: front transverse
- Displacement: 1970 cc
- Power: 150 PS (110 kW; 148 bhp)
