= Lancia Lybra =

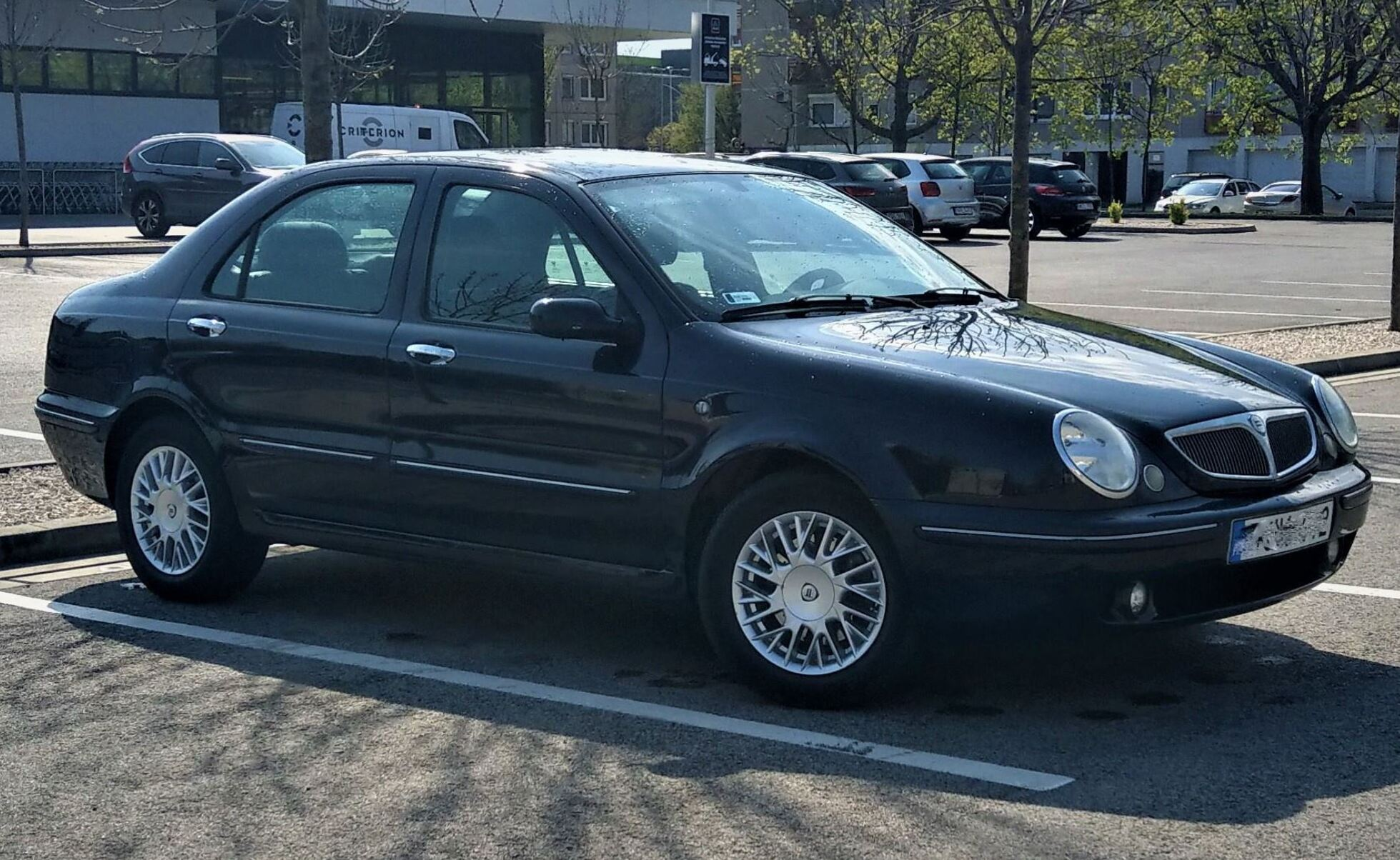

Overview
- Manufacturer: Lancia
- Production: 1998–2005
- Assembly: Italy: Turin Rivalta plant (1998–2002); Turin Mirafiori (2002–2005)
- Designer: Centro Stile Lancia: Enrico Fumia (initial design); Mike Robinson (final design); Flavio Manzoni (interior)

Body and chassis
- Class: Compact executive car (D)
- Body style: 4-door saloon 5-door estate
- Layout: Front-engine, front-wheel-drive
- Platform: Type Two rev. 3
- Related: Alfa Romeo 156; Alfa Romeo 147; Alfa Romeo GT; Fiat Bravo/Brava; Fiat Marea; Fiat Multipla

Powertrain
- Engine: petrol: 1.6 L Fiat Torque 16V I4; 1.8 L Fiat Family B 16V I4; 2.0 L Fiat Family C 20V I5; 2.4 L Fiat Family C 20V I5; diesel: 1.9 L JTD 8V I4; 2.4 L JTD 10V I5
- Transmission: 5-speed manual; 4-speed AISIN automatic

Dimensions
- Wheelbase: 2,593 mm (102.1 in)
- Length: 4,466 mm (175.8 in)
- Width: 1,743 mm (68.6 in)
- Height: Saloon: 1,462 mm (57.6 in); Estate: 1,470 mm (57.9 in)
- Curb weight: 1,250–1,420 kg (2,756–3,131 lb)

Chronology
- Predecessor: Lancia Dedra

The Lancia Lybra (Type 839) is a compact executive car manufactured and marketed by Italian automaker Lancia between 1998 and 2005, based on the Alfa Romeo 156 floorpan, and replacing the Dedra in Lancia's range. Like the Dedra, the Lybra was available as a Berlina (saloon) or a Station Wagon (estate). A total of 164,660 cars were made.

== History ==
The late 1990s were a dark period for the Italian group Fiat and its automotive subsidiaries. Losses were mounting, and the group's management, led by Italian-American financier Mr. Fresco, former second-in-command at General Electric, was determined to divest from the automotive division.

In this context, Lancia, needing to replace the Lancia Dedra, introduced the new Lybra. Based on the same platform as the Fiat Bravo, Brava, and Marea, it received less attention in terms of bodywork and had to settle for a rather bland exterior, although it was not lacking in a certain elegance.

Like its predecessor, it was available as a sedan (launched in France in September 1999) and as an "SW" estate (in April 2000). Equipped with modern, fuel-efficient engines, it was hampered by the brand's lack of financial resources to maintain its leading position among its competitors. Unlike its cousin, the Alfa Romeo 156, it did not receive any facelifts and its engines underwent few changes over the years.

Production of the vehicle ceased in 2005, and new management launched the Lancia Delta III in July 2008, which virtually replaced it.

== Name ==
The model's name refers to the zodiac sign of Libra and signalled an end to Lancia's Greek letter model name convention. The Lybra was manufactured in the Rivalta plant near Turin until 2002 and after that in Mirafiori plant in Turin.

== Styling ==
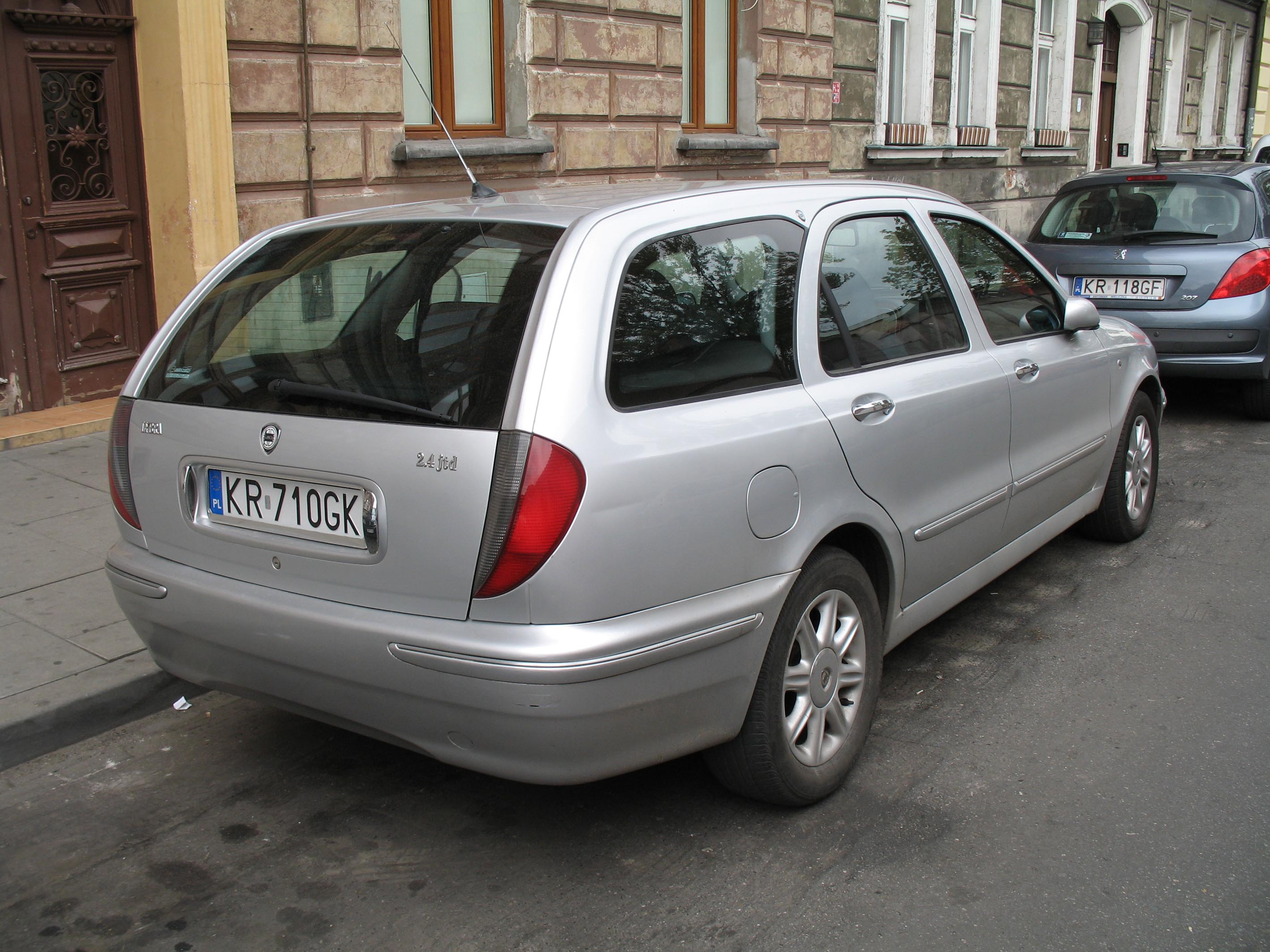
Lancia Lybra SW

The Lybra was styled at the Centro Stile Lancia, contrary to earlier Lancia models, which were commissioned to external design studios. Initial models were carried out by Enrico Fumia in 1992 and by the time of his departure from Centro Stile Lancia, the project was finished by Michael Robinson. The interior was designed by Flavio Manzoni.

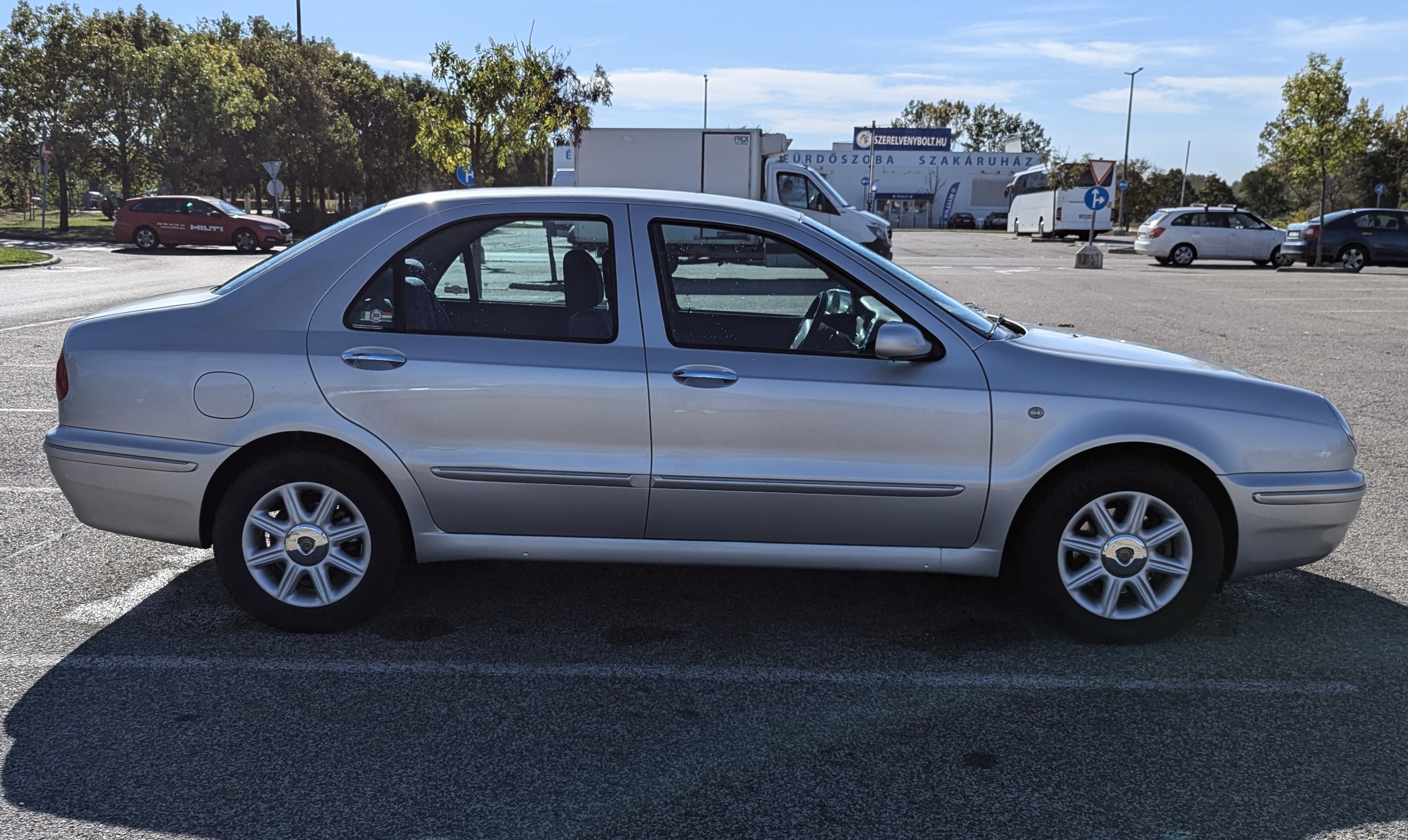
Lancia Lybra Berlina LX

The Lybra's distinctive taillights were shared with the 2001 facelift of the Fiat Marea sedan for the Latin American markets.

== Trim levels ==
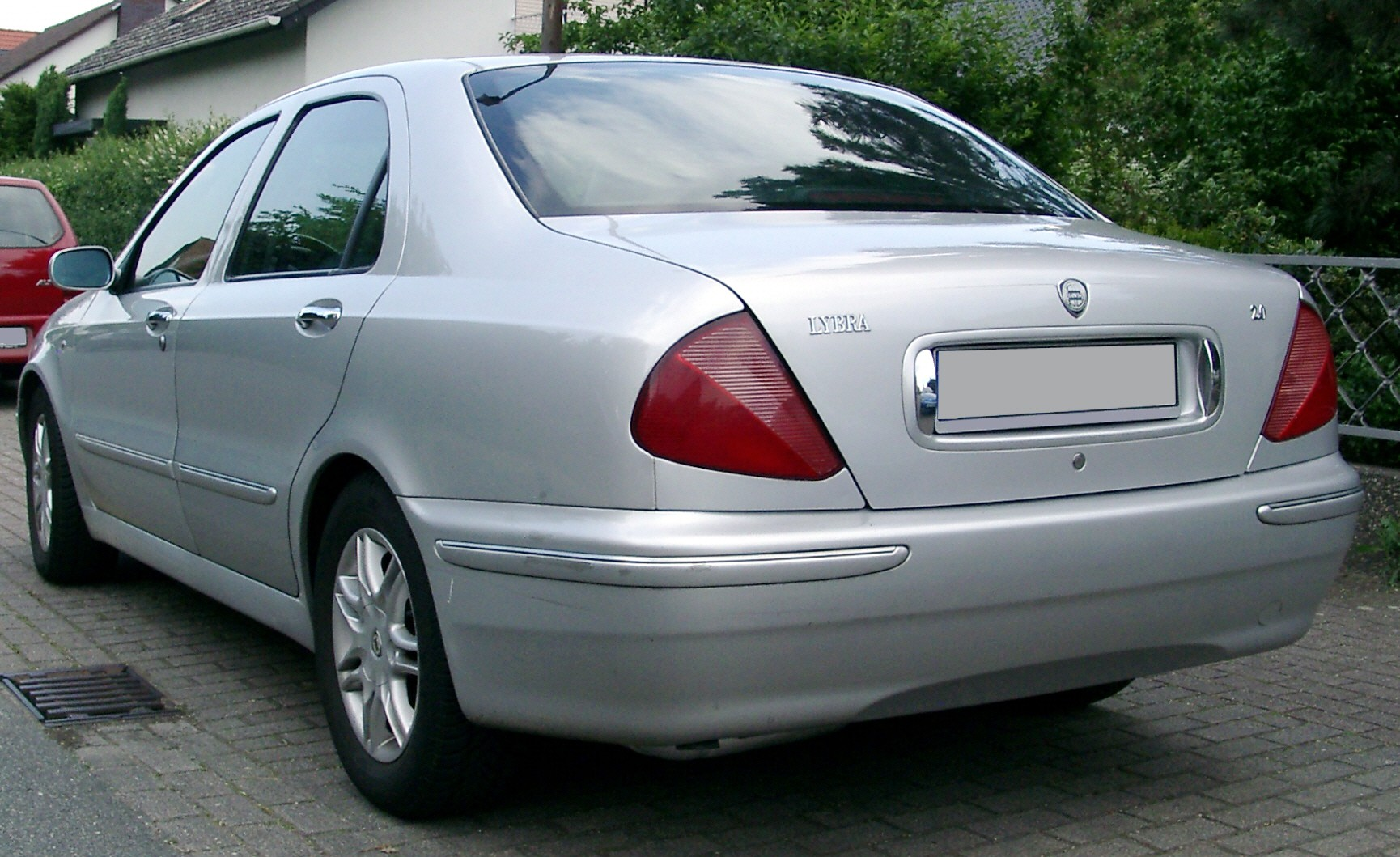
Lancia Lybra Berlina 2.0

At launch, the standard trim levels were called Lybra, LS and LX. In 2003, the Business and LS Plus trims were added in some markets, the Business trim has fabric seats, and wood decor on the interior while the LS Plus trim has Suhara or Madras upholstery and silver decor on the doors and the dashboard. The Emblema debuting in November 2002 at the Bologna Motor Show. It was inspired by the classic Lancia Flaminia and came with tobacco brown or beige leather interior (optional Alcantara), magnesium dashboard trim, exclusive 16 inch (10 spoke) alloy wheels, privacy glass and a gloss painted black roof.

Base model equipment: Electric front windows, 5" color display on the dashboard, dual zone heating system (without A/C), rear vents (one in the middle, and two on the bottom of the seats), ABS, EBD, 4 airbags (front and side), seatbelt pretensioner, electrically adjustable door mirrors with electric heating, electronic lumbar support and height adjustable driver's seat, 4-way adjustable steering wheel, arm rest front (with storage compartment) and rear (with cup holder), 5 three point seat belts and five headrests, ambient light in the bottom and inside of the doors, remote key, FPS system. 15" wheels, and 195/65 R15 tyres.

Optional equipment: A/C, GPS navigation with a GSM phone, electronic adjustable front seats, 4 electronic windows (up and down automatic), electrochromic rearview mirror, rain sensor, demister sensor, leather, Alcantara or Suhara (after 15.12.2003) seats, electrically adjustable door mirrors with fold function, sunroof, cruise control, Bose sound system with 7 speakers, 6 disc CD changer, AUX, 6 airbags (2 front, 2 side, and 2 side curtain), three 180W cigarette lighter sockets, xenon headlights, headlight washers, Nivomat self-levelling hydropneumatic rear suspension, fog lights, 60/40 split fold-down rear seats (optional for Berlina), multifunction leather steering wheel and gear knob, ASR with hill-holder (only for the 1.9 JTD, 2.0 20v, 2.4 JTD), 15" wheels and 205/60 or 16" 205/55 tyres.

LX trim equipment: Alcantara interior, leather steering wheel with radio control buttons, leather gear knob, Bose sound-system, cruise control (for 2.0 petrol), foglight, A/C, alloy wheels. The equipment is modified during the production, and depends on the market.

== Special editions ==
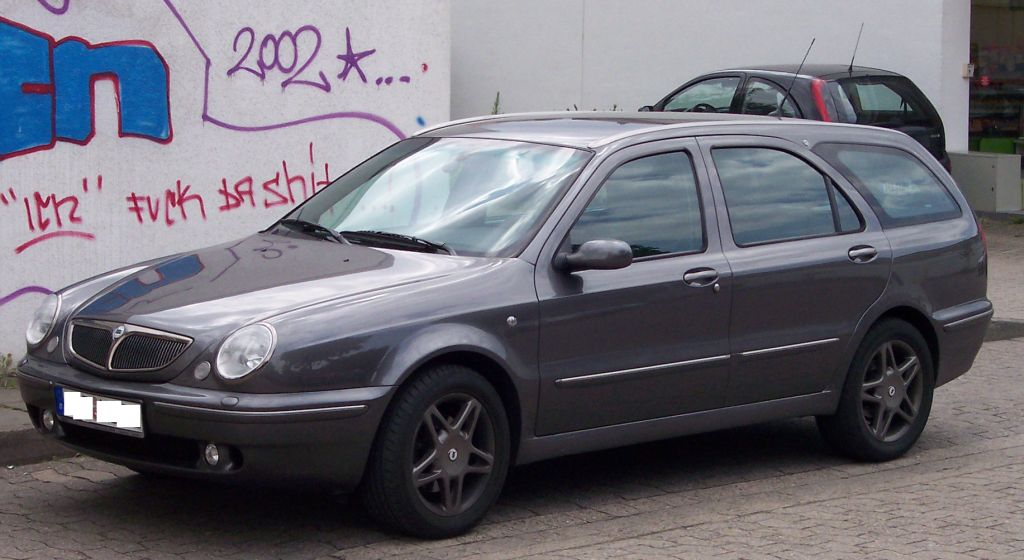
Lancia Lybra Intensa SW in 'Grigio Fontana'

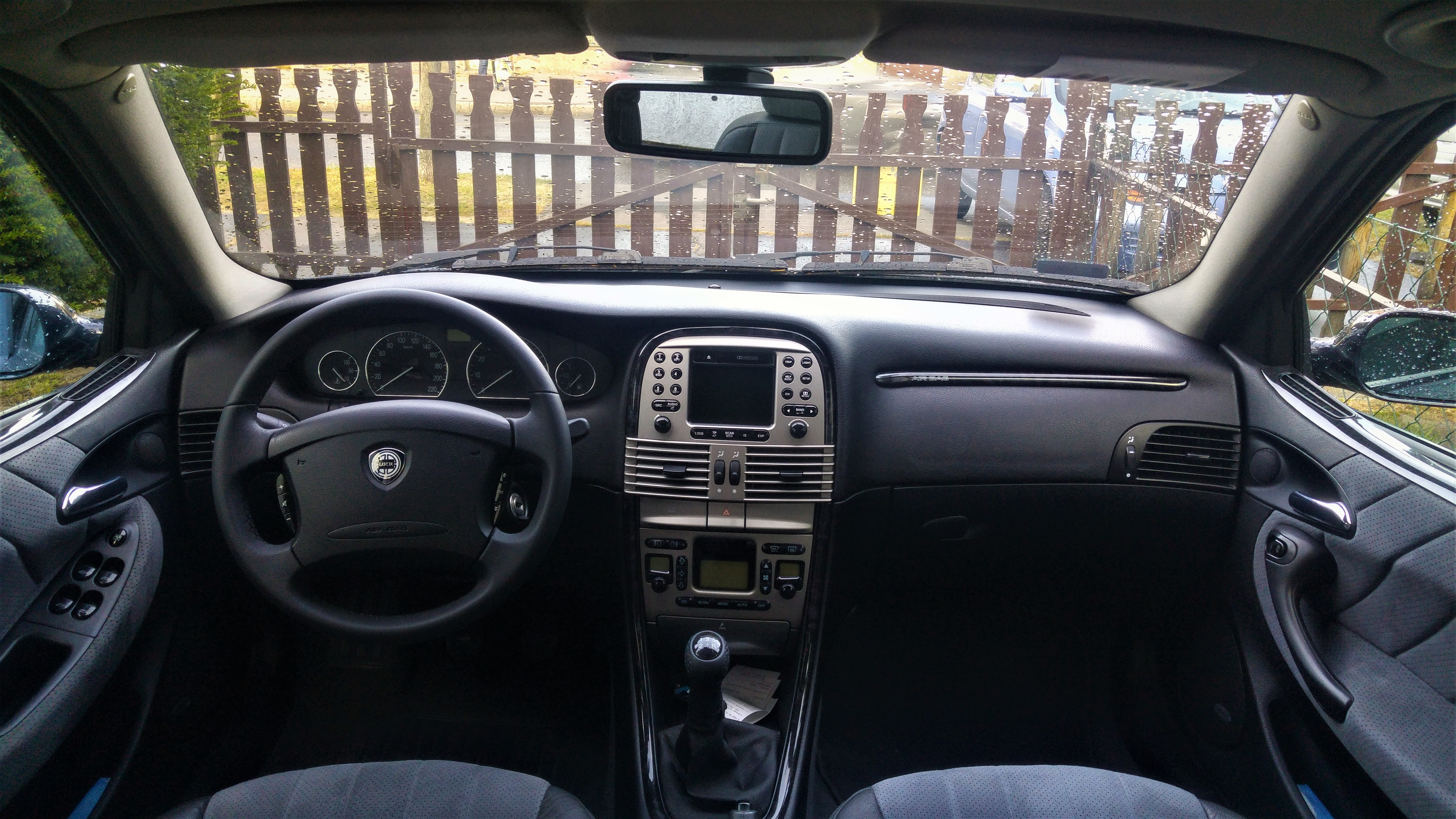
Lancia Lybra Intensa interior

Four special editions of the Lybra were offered during its production run:

Business: Only in two colours (435 Blu Lancia and 612 Grigio Elisa Met), and two engines (1.6 16v or 1.9 JTD). Interior in basic grey cloth. Higher Trim level like than base model Lybra, added rear electric windows, 6 AirBag and fog light.

Executive: This model was focused on luxury and featured leather or Alcantara seats and all optional equipment as standard (demister sensor, sunroof, photocromatic rearview mirror, foldable side mirrors, heated seats, satellite navigation, GSM Phone, Cruise control, xenon headlights and headlamp washer, Nivomat rear suspension, Bose sound system), along with special 15-spoke 16” alloy wheels. Only two engines were available for this model, the 2.0 20v petrol, and 2.4 JTD diesel.

Intensa: The Intensa Edition is characterised with its dark accents consisting of darkened front grille, and darkened chrome around the outside, on the lights, license plate light cover, chrome strip on the bumpers and the doors, dark grey pentagram-shaped alloy wheels. An exclusive dark grey exterior colour called the 'Grigio Fontana' was also available for this trim. On the interior, the Intensa featured a combination of black leather and dark grey Alcantara seats with a dark wood insert on the doors and the dashboard, a chrome door handle, black background with chrome rings in the gauge cluster, chrome anchor points in the trunk and a Bose sound system as standard. Only 4 engines were available, 1.8 (for Nedherlands), 1.9 JTD, 2.0 20v petrol, and 2.4 JTD.

Emblema: Available with 1.9 JTD, 2.4 JTD or 2.0 20v engines. Titanium trimmed console and interior details. Black roof option in SW (with black ‘railings’). Special 20-spoke 16” wheels. Interior trim could be chosen from beige leather, Alcantara or Suhara (after 15.12.2003) tobacco leather or tobacco Suhara interior colour options. This trim us above of the Executive and LX, Bose, GPS, dimmed interior mirror is optional.

== Specifications ==
The Lancia Lybra has a front-wheel drive layout with transversely-mounted engines. The Lybra is available with a 5-speed manual transmission. Models equipped with the 2.0 L engine had an option of a 4-speed Aisin automatic transmission, called the Comfortronic by Lancia. The 2.4 diesel was upgraded in 2000 and gained some additional power. In 2002 Fiat revised it again and it gained another ten horsepower, for a total of 150.

The Lybra utilises MacPherson struts at the front and BLG ("Bracci Longitudinali Guidati", translating to "Guided Longitudinal Arms") multilink rear suspension at the rear. Estate versions were also available with Boge-Nivomat self-levelling hydropneumatic rear suspension. The car uses four-wheel disk brakes, with front ventilated, ABS with EBD and optional ASR with hill-holder.

Model	Displacement	Power	Torque	Top speed	Acceleration 0–100 km/h (0-62 mph) (Note: Sedan values before slash, SW to the right.)	CO_{2} emissions g/km	Kerb weight (Note: With 2 occupants and 40 kg luggage.)	Year
1.6 L 16v DOHC	1581 cc	103 PS (76 kW; 102 hp) at 5,750 rpm	144 N⋅m (106 lb⋅ft) at 4,000 rpm	185 km/h (115 mph)	11.3s/11.9s	199/203	1250 kg/1290 kg	
1.6 L 16v DOHC	1596 cc	103 PS (76 kW; 102 hp) at 5,750 rpm	145 N⋅m (107 lb⋅ft) at 4,000 rpm	185 km/h (115 mph)	11.3s/11.9s	194/197	1250 kg/1290 kg	from 2000
1.8 L 16v DOHC	1747 cc	131 PS (96 kW; 129 hp) at 6,300 rpm	164 N⋅m (121 lb⋅ft) at 3,800 rpm	201 km/h (125 mph)	10.3s/10.7s	199/205	1300 kg/1340 kg	Euro2
1.8 L 16v DOHC	1747 cc	130 PS (96 kW; 128 hp) at 6,300 rpm	156 N⋅m (115 lb⋅ft) at 3,800 rpm	201 km/h (125 mph)	10.3s/10.7s	198/206	1300 kg/1340 kg	from 2000
2.0 L 20v DOHC	1998 cc	154 PS (113 kW; 152 hp) at 6,500 rpm	186 N⋅m (137 lb⋅ft) at 3,750 rpm	210 km/h (130 mph)	9.6s/9.9s	236/238	1350 kg/1390 kg	Euro2
2.0 L 20v DOHC	1998 cc	150 PS (110 kW; 148 hp) at 6,500 rpm	181 N⋅m (133 lb⋅ft) at 3,750 rpm	210 km/h (130 mph)	9.6s/9.9s	233/238	1350 kg/1390 kg	from 2000
2.4 L 20v DOHC	2446 cc	170 PS (125 kW; 168 hp) at 6,000 rpm	226 N⋅m (167 lb⋅ft) at 3,500 rpm					only Lybra Protecta
1.9 L 8v SOHC JTD	1910 cc	105 PS (77 kW; 104 hp) at 4,000 rpm	255 N⋅m (188 lb⋅ft) at 2,000 rpm	185 km/h (115 mph)	11.3s/11.9s	154/159	1310 kg/1350 kg	
1.9 L 8v SOHC JTD	1910 cc	110 PS (81 kW; 108 hp) at 4,000 rpm	255 N⋅m (188 lb⋅ft) at 2,000 rpm					from 2000
1.9 L 8v SOHC JTD	1910 cc	115 PS (85 kW; 113 hp) at 4,000 rpm	275 N⋅m (203 lb⋅ft) at 2,000 rpm	190 km/h (118 mph)	10.8s/11.3s	157/162	1310 kg/1350 kg	from 2001
2.4 L 10v SOHC JTD	2387 cc	134 PS (99 kW; 132 hp) at 4,000 rpm	304 N⋅m (224 lb⋅ft) at 2,000 rpm	200 km/h (124 mph)	9.9s/10.2s	179/182	1370 kg/1410 kg	
2.4 L 10v SOHC JTD	2387 cc	140 PS (103 kW; 138 hp) at 4,000 rpm	304 N⋅m (224 lb⋅ft) at 2,000 rpm	205 km/h (127 mph)				from 2000
2.4 L 10v SOHC JTD	2387 cc	150 PS (110 kW; 148 hp) at 4,000 rpm	308 N⋅m (227 lb⋅ft) at 1,800 rpm	212 km/h (132 mph)	9.4s/9.6s	176/179	1370 kg/1410 kg	from 2002

Lybra Euro 3 fuel consumption
l/100 km	Body	1.6 16v	1.8 16v	2.0 20v	1.9 JTD	2.4 JTD
Urban; Extra-urban; Combined	BN	11.2; 6.4; 8.2	11.8; 6.3; 8.3	13.8; 7.5; 9.8	8.1; 4.7; 5.9	8.9; 5.3; 6.6
Urban; Extra-urban; Combined	SW	11.4; 6.5; 8.3	12.4; 6.5; 8.7	14.0; 7.7; 10.0	8.4; 4.8; 6.1	9.1; 5.4; 6.8

== Sales ==
The Lancia Lybra failed to meet its initial sales targets. These were set at 55,000 to 65,000 a year.

The following are sales in Europe, which absorbed the majority of the vehicle's production:

Calendar year	Sales in Europe
1999	12,084
2000	53,218
2001	41,583
2002	22,830
2003	16,559
2004	9,525
2005	5,021
