= Fiat X1/9 =

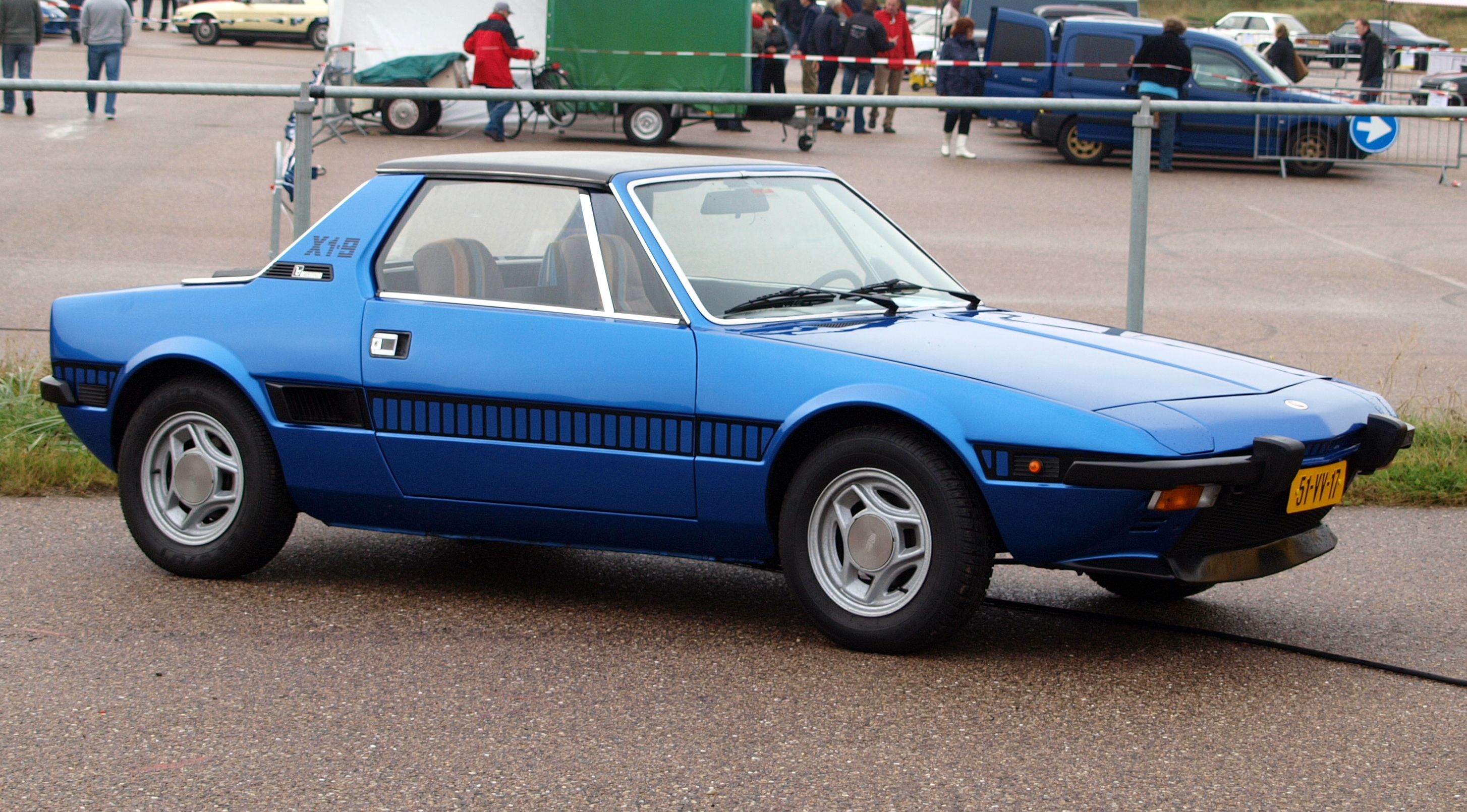

Overview
- Manufacturer: Fiat (1972–1982); Bertone (1982–1989)
- Also called: Bertone X1/9
- Production: 1972–1989; ~140,500 produced (Fiat); ~19,500 (Bertone)
- Assembly: Fiat; Bertone (after 1982); South Africa: Rosslyn
- Designer: Marcello Gandini at Bertone

Body and chassis
- Class: Sports car
- Body style: Two-seater targa
- Layout: Transverse mid-engine, rear-wheel drive
- Related: Fiat 128; Fiat Ritmo

Powertrain
- Engine: 1,290 cc 128.AS I4 (1972–78); 1,498 cc 138.A2/A4 I4 (1978–89)
- Transmission: 4-speed manual (1972–78); 5-speed manual (1978–89)

Dimensions
- Wheelbase: 2,202 mm (86.7 in)
- Length: 1972–78: 3,830 mm (150.8 in); 1978–89: 3,969 mm (156.3 in)
- Width: 1,570 mm (61.8 in)
- Height: 1972–78: 1,170 mm (46.1 in); 1978–89: 1,180 mm (46.5 in)
- Kerb weight: 880–920 kg (1,940–2,028 lb)

Chronology
- Predecessor: Fiat 850 Spider; Fiat 500 Gamine Vignale
- Successor: Fiat Barchetta

The Fiat X1/9 is an Italian two-seater mid-engined sports car designed by Bertone and manufactured by Fiat from 1972–1982 and subsequently by Gruppo Bertone from 1982–1989.

With a transverse engine and gearbox in a mid-mounted, rear-wheel drive configuration, the X1/9 was noted for its balanced handling, retractable headlights, lightweight removable hardtop which could be stowed under the bonnet, front and rear storage compartments — and for being the first Fiat to have been designed from its conception to meet US safety regulations.

== History ==
=== Design and development ===
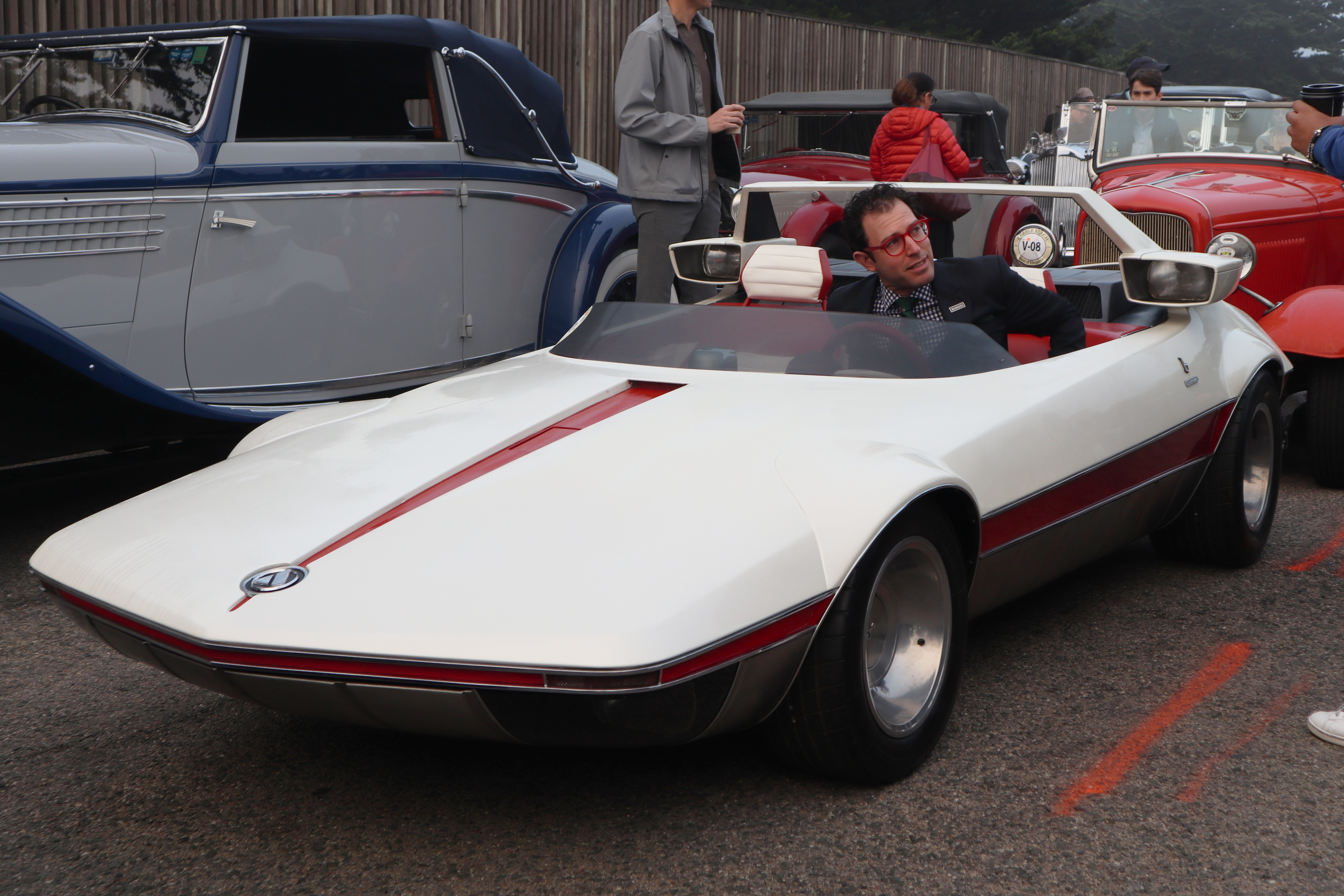
Bertone Runabout concept car

The X1/9 was developed from the 1969 Autobianchi A112 Runabout concept, with styling by Bertone under chief designer Marcello Gandini.

Even though the Runabout was named for the Autobianchi A112, it was powered by a version of the brand new Fiat 128 SOHC engine. The Runabout featured a distinctive wedge shape and took many styling cues from contemporary power-boat design. Though the more extreme features of the Runabout such as the C pillar mounted headlights and the small wind-deflector windscreen were lost for the production car, many aesthetic features of the Autobianchi Runabout are readily identifiable on the X1/9. The long flat bonnet with central indentation, the large front overhang, the wedge shape with prominent C-pillar roll-over hoop and the car-length indented waterline all made the successful transition to the X1/9, giving it a highly distinctive appearance.

Designed around the Fiat SOHC engine and transmission from the front wheel drive Fiat 128, the X1/9 relocated the transverse drive train and suspension assembly from the front of the 128 to the rear of the passenger cabin, directly in front of the rear axle, giving a mid-engined layout. The engine was designed by Aurelio Lampredi, famed Ferrari engine designer before he went to work for FIAT (the parent company, at that time). The fuel tank and spare wheel were located ahead of the engine, behind the driver and passenger seats respectively — optimizing the proportion of the car's weight within its wheelbase for more balanced handling and enabling cargo areas front and rear.

Once developed for production, the two-seater featured sharp-edged styling with a wedge shape, retractable headlights, an integrated front spoiler and a removable hard top roof panel (targa top). The removable hardtop could be stored in the front boot; a second luggage compartment was provided at the rear of the car, accessible through a conventional boot lid.

Unlike Fiat's marketing nomenclature at the time which used a numerical system (e.g., 127, 128, 124, 131) denoting relative position in the model range, the X1/9 retained its prototype code as its marketing name. Fiat's prototype coding used X0 for engines, X1 for passenger vehicles and X2 for commercial vehicles.^{[Note 1]} The X1/9 was thus the ninth passenger car developed using the nomenclature.

=== Production and model evolution ===
Originally slated to debut at the November 1972 Turin Motor Show, the X1/9's launch was delayed until after the show to avoid upstaging the new Fiat 126 city car. Press test drives were held at the end of November 1972, on the Sicilian Madonie roads home to the Targa Florio road race.

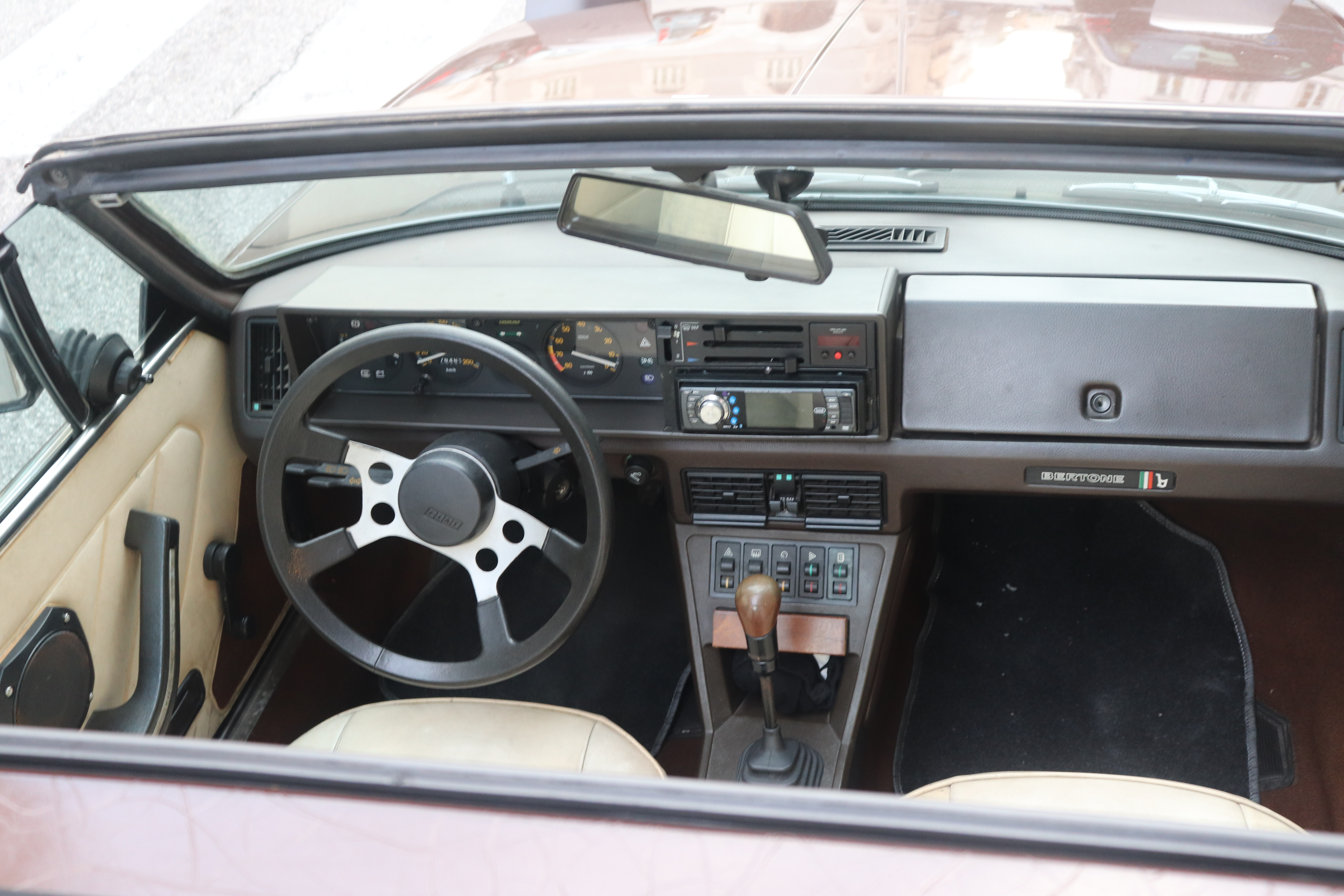
X1/9 Series II interior

The car was intended to replace the 850 Spider, another Bertone design, not the larger and pricier 124 Sport Spider whose production continued for much of the X1/9's life. The car's monocoque body was produced at the Bertone factory in Grugliasco (Turin) and then transported to the Fiat's Lingotto factory for final assembly. As mentioned before, the X1/9's type 128 AS 1,290 cc (79 cu in) single overhead cam straight-four engine was derived from the Fiat 128, specifically from the 128 Coupé 1300.

Changes included a new cast aluminium oil sump, complementing the aluminium cylinder head. With a twin-choke Weber 32 DMTR carburettor and an 8.9:1 compression ratio, the engine produced 75 DIN-rated metric horsepower (55 kW; 74 hp) at 6,000 rpm and 97 DIN-rated newton-metres (72 lb⋅ft) of torque at 3,400 rpm. The all-synchronized 4-speed transmission was also carried over from the 128, though with a taller fourth gear ratio to exploit the sports car's better aerodynamics. As a consequence the X1/9 had a top speed of over 170 km/h (106 mph), 10 km/h higher than the similarly engined but 65 kg lighter 128 Coupé 1300.

As standard the X1/9 came with 4.5J×13-inch stamped steel wheels fitted with 145 HR 13 tyres, while cast alloy wheels were an extra-cost option.

Suspension was fully independent, with MacPherson struts front and rear. The split circuit brake system used equally sized 227 mm (8.9 in) solid discs all around. Steering was rack and pinion.

The interior, upholstered in leatherette, featured two bucket seats with integrated headrests and a four-spoke steering wheel (resembling the one fitted to the Lamborghini Marzal). The engine cover and rear trunk could be opened with (lockable) interior latches located on the driver's side door jamb.

Due to the fact that elements of a frontwheel drive car with a tranverse engine were 'simply' moved backwards, some uncommon solutions can be found: the rear suspension has adjustable auxiliary control arms, the speedometer is driven by a very long cable running forward from the gearbox and making a 180 degree turn, and the cooling system with radiator in the front features long coolant tubes running to the engine in the rear.

Fiat began marketing a right-hand drive variant in 1976. Prior to this, Radbourne Racing had been converting left-hand drive X1/9s to a right-hand drive configuration for sale in the UK market. None of these early conversions are believed to remain in existence.

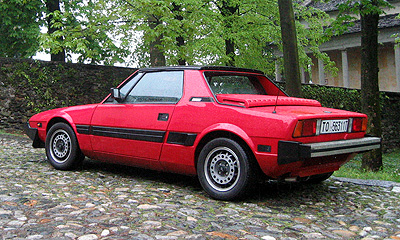
1988 X1/9 1500 cc

For 1979, FIAT introduced the only major revision of the X1/9, often referred to as "Series II". The 1.3L/4-speed FIAT 128-derived drivetrain was replaced by an adaptation of the FIAT Ritmo 1.5L/5-speed drivetrain. Exterior changes include replacing the original "Series I" wrap-around steel split bumpers with an aluminum box channel bumper and corner trim, and a taller engine compartment lid to accommodate the taller engine.

In 1982, shortly after the introduction of the 1500 model, complete production was assumed by Bertone with models subsequently badged as the "Bertone" X1/9. Bertone models featured revised footwells redesigned to enhance legroom and sitting comfort for persons taller than the original design's target.

The last production models were named the Gran Finale and sold over the 1989/1990 period. They were a dealer modification of the special edition (commonly abbreviated to SE) of 1988/1989, with the addition of a rear spoiler and "gran finale" badges.

==== The X1/9 in the United States ====
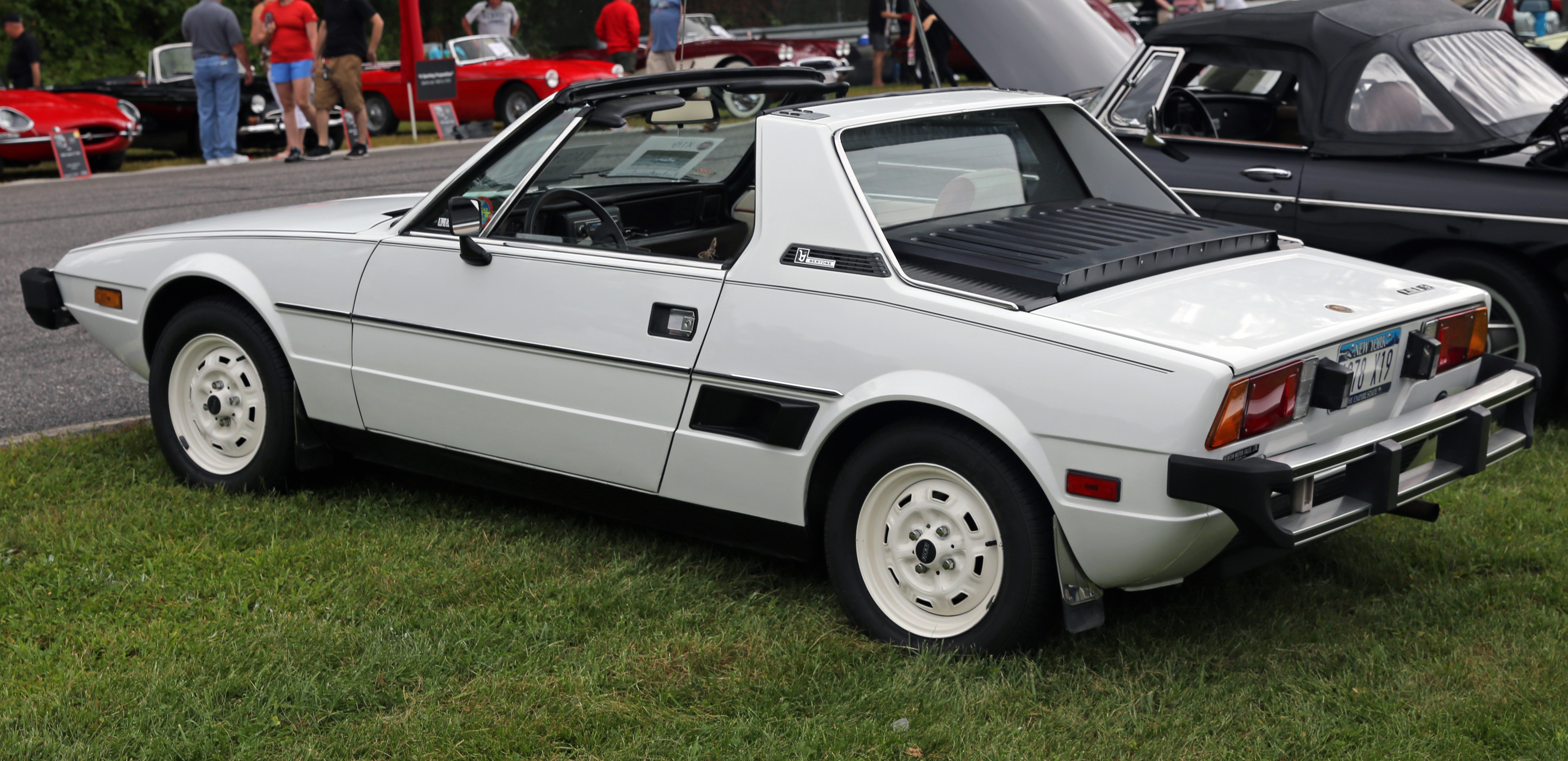
1978 U.S. market Fiat X1/9 with "ladder" bumpers

Reported numbers vary by source, but about 2/3 of the approximately 160,000 X1/9s produced were sold in the USA. Three generations of X1/9 were sold in the U.S.: 1974 cars, 1975-1978 cars, and 1979-1989 cars.

The 1974 U.S. examples aligned closely with worldwide models, including small (but U.S.-specific) bumpers, 63 hp (47 kW) 1290 cc engines, and four-speed transmissions.

The 1975-1978 U.S. cars were unique to the U.S. market with "ladder-style" impact absorbing bumpers front and rear. To meet U.S. evaporative and exhaust emission standards, X1/9s were fitted with exhaust gas recirculation valves, air pumps and activated charcoal systems. These cars were rated at 61 hp (45 kW). This was also how Japanese market cars were specified; the same engine and also the ladder bumpers and side marker lights.

In 1979, U.S. cars received increases in displacement to 1498 cc and five-speed transmissions both sourced from FIAT's Ritmo ("Strada" in USA) small sedan, with max power up to 67 hp (50 kW). The 1979 U.S. cars retained the previous emission controls. Model years 1980 and 1981 saw a transition from carburetion to Bosch L-Jetronic fuel injection, with the changeover coming in 1980 for cars sold in California and a gradual changeover for "federal" cars from late 1980 to 1981 model years. The combination of fuel injection (FI), a catalytic converter and unleaded gasoline allowed these cars to meet California's and later federal emission standards. Fuel injected cars were rated at 75 hp (56 kW).

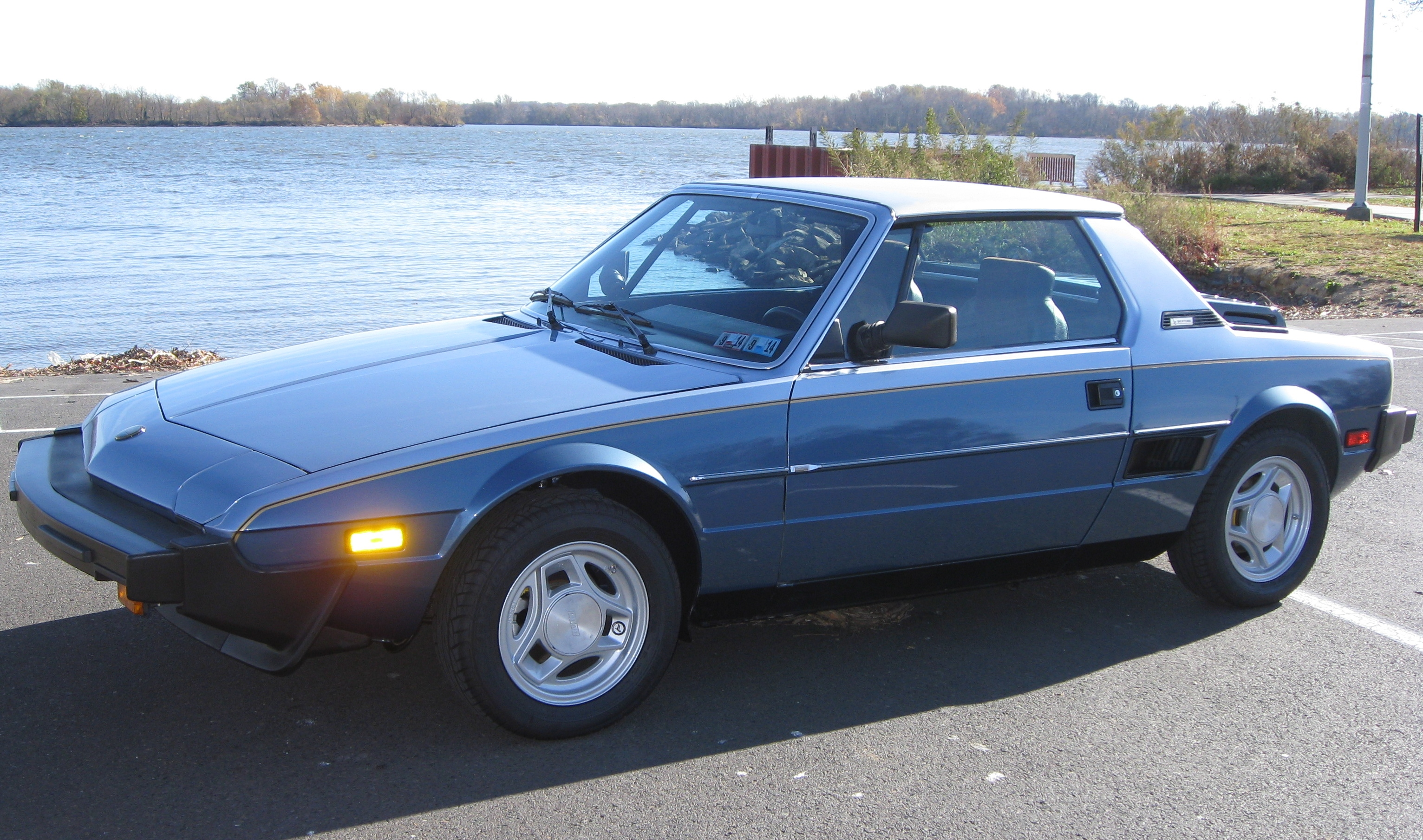
1986 Bertone X1/9 USA model (pictured with owner-installed Euro-spec Cromodora CD-58 wheels and dealer-installed body-side moldings)

In 1979, U.S. X1/9s also received both exterior and interior revisions including integrated bumpers front and rear, as well as new front grilles and air dams. The instrument panel and dash redesign moved the heating and ventilation controls from the center console up to the main dash, relocated the radio to the center dash area, moved the fuse panel from the area above the driver's left knee to the area above the passenger's footwell where the glovebox was, and moved the glovebox to atop the dash.

During 1982, Fiat ended its presence in the U.S. Fiat turned over marketing and support of the X1/9 to International Automobile Importers, Inc., headed by Malcolm Bricklin, and turned over full production duties to Bertone.

In 1983, the orphaned X1/9 was sold as the "Bertone X1/9". IAI and Bertone continued to update the X1/9, providing improved rust protection, revised seating to accommodate taller drivers, and a modernized electrical system for 1984 models.

U.S. sales of the X1/9 fell in the final few years, and 1987 was the last year that IAI imported X1/9s to the U.S.

From mid-1987 to end of the production in 1989, Bertone X1/9s were imported to the U.S. by M.I.K. Automotive, Inc. in North Hollywood, California, owned by Miro Kefurt, who at that time was the number one Bertone dealer in the U.S. and one of the very few that sold exclusively X1/9s. The last four X1/9s were imported to the U.S. in April 1990 (1989 model year cars, produced in December 1989).

==== The X1/9 in the Australia and New Zealand ====
The X1/9 was exported and sold in Australia and New Zealand in 1978, initially with the smaller 1.3L engine and 4-speed gearbox although this was quickly changed to the larger 1.5L engine and 5-speed gearbox. When the car became a Bertone model it needed to pass a new Australian Design Rules test to be sold there. Bertone also had to find new showrooms. This meant the X1/9 was withdrawn from sale in Australia in 1983. It continued being sold in New Zealand until 1985.

The Bertone X1/9 made a return to the Australian market in 1988 and was sold until 1991.

U.S. X1/9 model year changes
Model year	Specs	Notable changes and features
1974	1290 cc, price $4,167, curb weight 1,933 lb	Small wrap-around steel bumpers with large rubber blocks; chrome trim rear fascia; oval holes in rear lower valence; manual choke (operating knob located between the seats); no access panel to distributor from spare tire well.
1975	1290 cc, price $4,608, curb weight 2,085 lb	Ladder-style aluminum bumpers; aluminium grille replaced oval holes in rear valence; automatic choke controlled by coolant temperature.
1976	1290 cc, price $4,947, curb weight 1,970 lb	Targa top front profile and windshield frame targa top seal modified for improved water-tightness.
1977	1290 cc, price $5,195, curb weight 1,955 lb	Model year included an unknown number of "special edition" cars with interior colours and trims and exterior striping unique to the edition. Affixed to the right fender, the identifying label had the Italian flag, a four digit serial number, and Nuccio Bertone's signature. First year for distributor access panel in spare wheel compartment.
1978	1290 cc, price $5,700, curb weight 1,955 lb	Late-1978 cars relocated the front trunk release handle from the glovebox to the left side of the driver's footwell.
1979	1498 cc, price $7,379, curb weight 2,040 lb	First major makeover included: square, aluminium bumpers with "elephant ears" side trim; horizontal slat front grille; revised interior included new dash, new seating; drivetrain improvements included 1.5L engine with Bosch electronic ignition, five-speed transaxle, more durable axles and wheel bearings; raised engine cover to accommodate taller engine; addition of a full-width access panel between the engine compartment and rear trunk; modern fuse and relay center; the words "five speed" in front of a ribbed background added to the redesigned "X1/9" model designation badge on the right rear decklid.
1980	1498 cc, price $8,190, curb weight 2,060 lb	Bosch L-Jetronic fuel injection fitted to California cars. Fuel injected cars: radio antenna moved from left to right rear fender to accommodate injector cooling blower; X1/9 model designation badge replaced "five speed" with "fuel injection." Carbureted cars: X1/9 model designation badge revised slightly with a plain background behind the words "five speed." All cars: sideview mirror moved from door mounting to through-glass mounting; one additional vent cutout added to each side of engine cover.
1981	1498 cc, price $8,997, curb weight 2,040 lb	Bosch L-Jetronic fuel injection fitted to federal (49-state) cars.
1982	1498 cc, price $10,990, curb weight 2,120 lb	Newly offered two-tone paint scheme with the paint line midway up the wheel arches.
1983	1498 cc, price $10,990, curb weight 2,120 lb	First year that Bertone-logo badges replaced FIAT wreath badges on the front nose and rear decklid. X1/9 model designation badge changed back from "fuel injection" to "five speed." Leather-covered seats, door cards, and steering wheel offered as option.
1984	1498 cc, price $13,990, curb weight 2,130 lb	Electrical system modernized (GBC fuses are replaced by ATC blade style fuses in the fuse and relay centre under the dash just below the glove box). New two-tone paint scheme with the paint line higher on the body, just below the greenhouse. First year for Cromodora CD-179 wheels (nicknamed "Trons"). Optional full-width rear decklid spoiler available.
1985	1498 cc	Bumper finish changed from anodized aluminium to flat black. X1/9 model designation badge on right rear decklid discontinued.
1986	1498 cc	Sail panel moulding/trim finish changed from natural aluminium to flat black. Added federally required center high mounted stop light (CHMSL) for cars manufactured after January 1, 1986; mounted in rear window just below the targa bar.
1987	1498 cc, price $11,330, curb weight 2,210 lb	Minor appearance makeover includes wide body side mouldings, fully padded three-spoke steering wheel, new font for characters on instrument panel (panel layout unchanged), cosmetic changes to climate controls on AC-equipped cars. First year for Speedline "phone dial" wheels, which were fitted with Pirelli P3 185/60-R13 tires. Full "blackout" treatment to windshield mouldings, door frame surround mouldings, and sail panel trim and moulding pieces.
1988	1498 cc, price $12,690, curb weight 2,110 lb	No changes
1989	1498 cc	Last year, no changes.

== Technical specifications ==
Fiat X1/9	1.3 Litre world model (1972–1978)	1.5 Litre world model (1979–1989)	1.5 Litre US model (1980–1989)
Powertrain and running gear
Engine	Inline, four cylinders, Otto cycle, short stroke, M/R layout		
Bore × stroke	86.0 mm × 55.5 mm (3.39 in × 2.19 in)	86.4 mm × 63.9 mm (3.40 in × 2.52 in)	
Displacement	1,290 cc (78.7 cu in)	1,498 cc (91.4 cu in)	
Valvetrain	Belt-driven single overhead camshaft, 2 valves per cylinder, reverse-flow layout		
Compression ratio	8.9:1	9.2:1	8.5:1
Maximum power	75 PS (55 kW; 74 hp) at 6000 rpm	85 PS (63 kW; 84 hp) at 6000 rpm	75 hp (56 kW; 76 PS) at 5500 rpm
Maximum torque	97 N⋅m (72 lb⋅ft) at 3400 rpm	118 N⋅m (87 lb⋅ft) at 3200 rpm	108 N⋅m (79.6 lb⋅ft) at 3000 rpm
Induction	Single two-barrel Weber 32 DMTR 22 downdraft carburetor	Single two-barrel Weber 34 DATR7/250 downdraft carburetor	Bosch L-Jetronic fuel injection
Cooling	Water-cooled		
Clutch	Single dry plate with hydraulic activation		
Transmission	Manual, 4 speeds + reverse	Manual, 5 speeds + reverse	
Driving wheels	Rear		
Body/chassis	Steel unibody		
Front Suspension	Independent, lower lateral link with reaction strut, MacPherson struts with concentric coil springs		
Rear suspension	Independent, lower A-arm, MacPherson struts with concentric coil springs		
Brakes	Four-wheel disc brakes with floating calipers and 227 mm (8.9 in) diameter rotors. 48 mm (1.9 in) diameter front pistons, 34 mm (1.3 in) diameter rear. Dual-circuit hydraulic activation. Cable operated Hand brake on the rear calipers		
Electrical system	12V, 460W alternator, 45Ah battery		12V, 60Ah battery Non-A/C cars: 65 AMP Alternator A/C cars: 70 AMP alternator
Dimensions and weights
Length	3,830 mm (150.8 in)	3,960 mm (155.9 in)	3,969 mm (156.3 in)
Width	1,570 mm (61.8 in)		
Height	1,170 mm (46.1 in)	1,180 mm (46.5 in)	
Wheelbase	2,202 mm (86.7 in)		
Track F/R	1,335 mm (52.6 in) / 1,343 mm (52.9 in)	1,350 mm (53.1 in) / 1,350 mm (53.1 in)	1,355 mm (53.3 in) / 1,362 mm (53.6 in)
Tires	145/80 R13, 165/70 R13, 185/60 R13		
Weight	880 kg (1,940.1 lb) (dry)	920 kg (2,028.3 lb) (dry)	Curb weight w/o A/C: 2,130 lb. Curb weight with A/C: 2,210 lb.
Fuel capacity	47.7 L (10.5 imp gal; 12.6 US gal)		
Acceleration	33.748 seconds (Standing kilometre)		
Top speed	170 km/h (105.6 mph)	185 km/h (115.0 mph)	
Fuel consumption	6.1 L/100 km (46.3 mpg_{‑imp}; 38.6 mpg_{‑US}) at 90 km/h (56 mph); 7.68 L/100 km (36.8 mpg_{‑imp}; 30.6 mpg_{‑US}) at 120 km/h (75 mph); 7.5 L/100 km (37.7 mpg_{‑imp}; 31.4 mpg_{‑US}) city		1984-1989 EPA Fuel Mileage Rating 20 MPG City / 26 MPG Highway / 22 MPG Combined

== Concept cars and prototypes ==
Bertone conducted at least three design and engineering studies with the X1/9. Along with several standard X1/9s taken from the production line, examples of all three design studies are now on display in the Volandia Museum adjacent to the Malpensa/Milan airport, which is the new home of the majority of the Bertone collection that was sold after the company went through final bankruptcy proceedings.

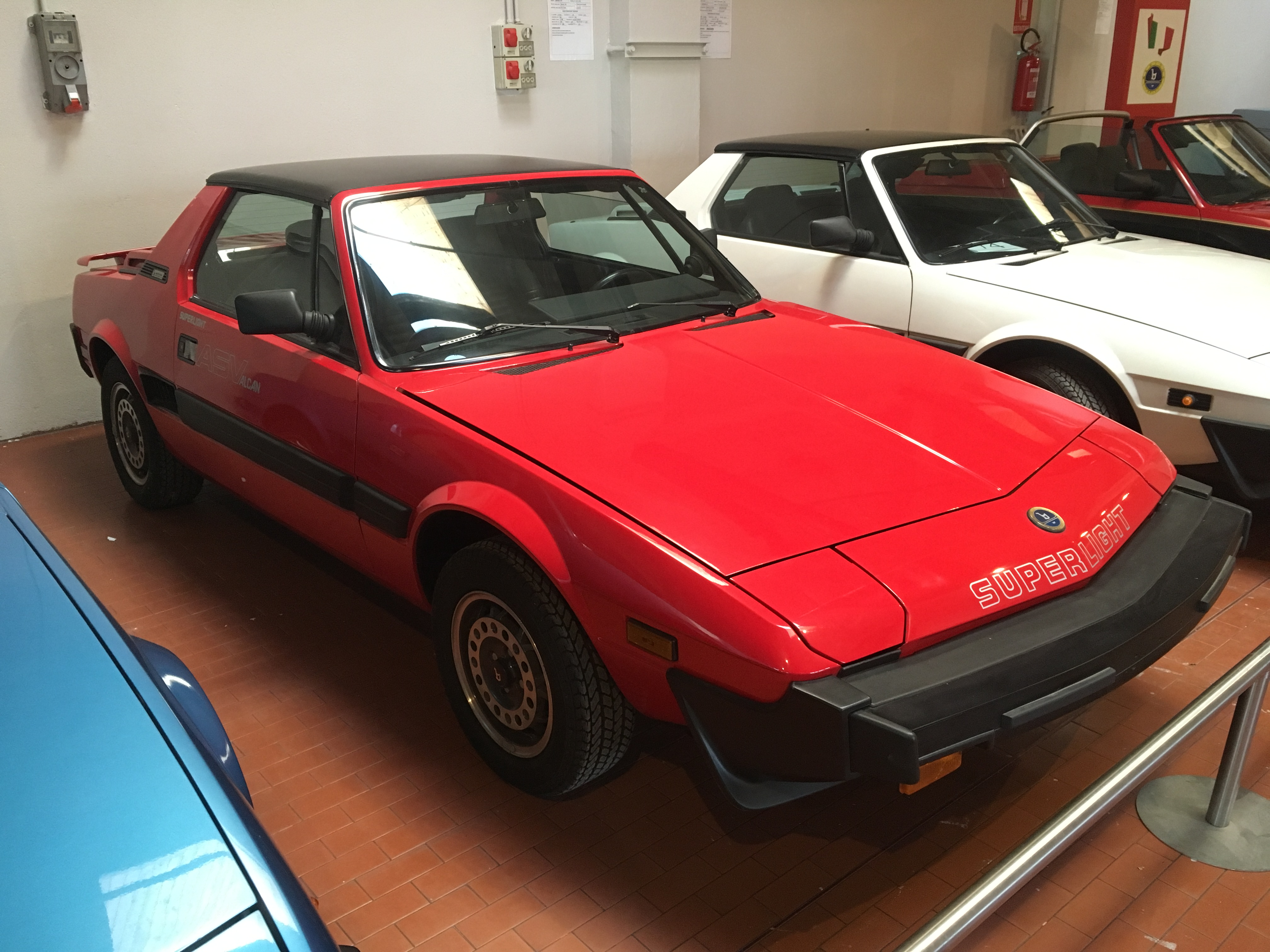
X1/9 Superlight prototype

=== Fiat X1/9 Superlight ===
An all-aluminum X1/9 body shell was developed in concert with ALCAN. Five all-aluminum cars, dubbed "Superlight" (not Superleggera), were built to the same strength and stiffness of the normal steel cars, and tested for vibration, noise, high load input, and corrosion. The program also tested the specially developed adhesives and techniques used to assemble bodyshell components. Weight savings were 1/3 of the normal steel body. Since a 24-hour Showroom Stock endurance race was expected to reveal a lot about the durability of aluminum cars, one of these aluminum-bodied prototypes was entered into the 1987 Longest Day of Nelson Ledges race, but a mishap on a test and tune practice lap prevented the car from running the race.

=== Fiat X1/9 "Passo Lungo" ===
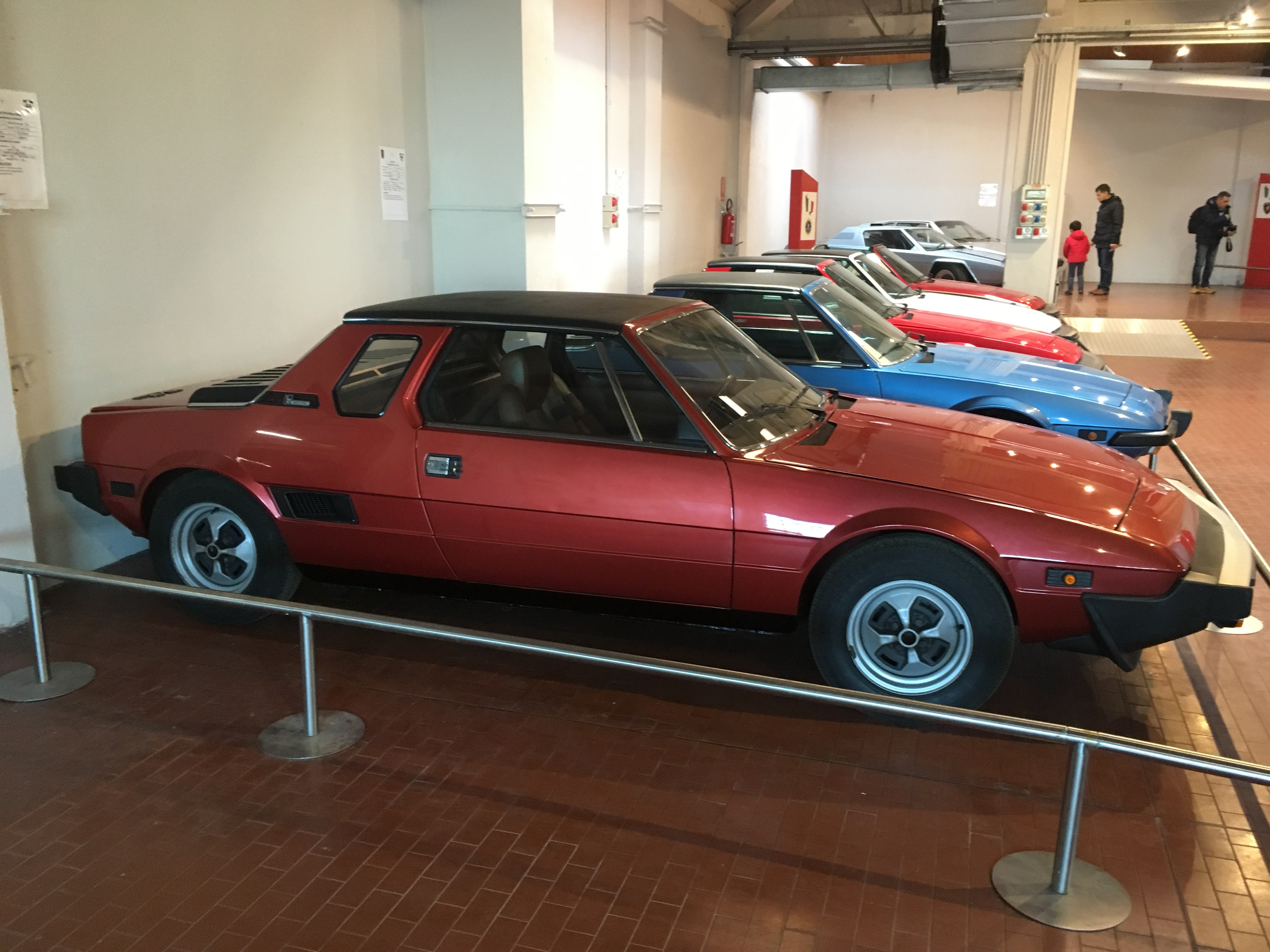
X1/9 "Passo Lungo" prototype

The second design study was a 2+1 completed in 1981, dubbed "Passo Lungo." 2 inches (5 cm) of width was added to the entire car, and more than 7 inches (18 cm) of length was added behind the door and ahead of the rear wheels. The spare tire was relocated to the new space behind the driver's seat, and a third seat was added to the space behind the passenger seat originally used for the spare tire. "Opera" windows were added to the sail panels. The stock 1.5L engine was replaced by the 2.0L DOHC FIAT engine to add more power to compensate for the added weight.

The X1/9 "Passo Lungo" was based on a European specification 1500 Fiat X/19 with a stretched wheelbase of 2,450 mm (96 in) to accommodate a back seat, usable only by small children. Only one example is known to exist which is currently on display with the Bertone collection in Volandia. In stretching the body, the targa roof also had to be made longer and could no longer be stowed in the front boot of the car (as it had been designed for in the normal X1/9).

=== Fiat X1/9 Spider ===
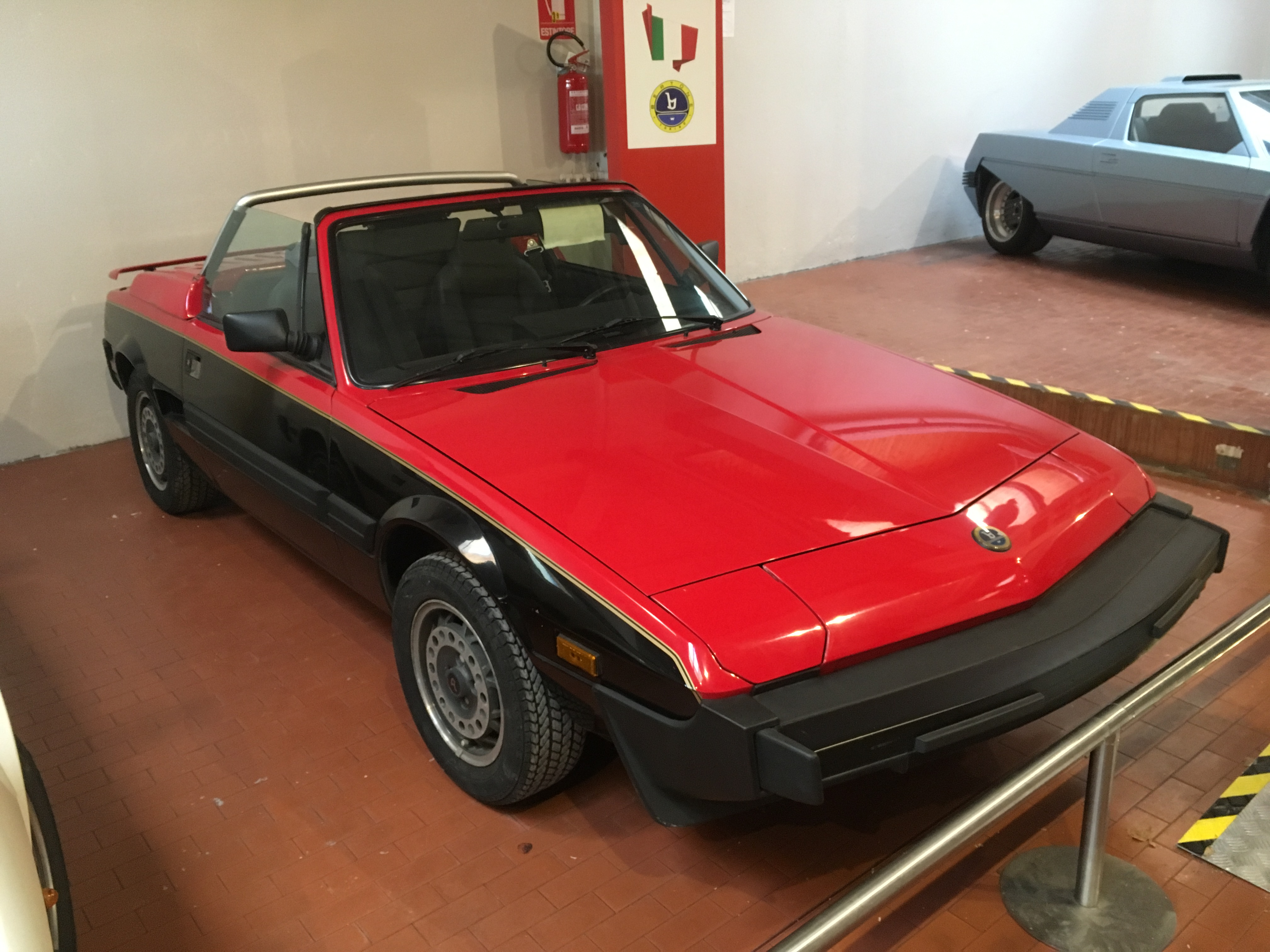
X1/9 Spider prototype

The third study was a full-convertible top (Spider) version of the X1/9. The fixed rear window and sail panels were deleted, and a more conventional roll bar/hoop was added for rollover protection. A fascia was fabricated to mate with the engine compartment lid to cover the body shoulders where the sails panels used to be. The convertible top is not a structure that emerges from behind the passenger compartment area; rather it is a flexible cover that mounts using the original targa top clips along the windshield in front, stretches over and is supported by the new roll bar, and is secured into place in the rear with twist-clips.

== Racing ==
=== Filipinetti ===
The Filipinetti X1/9 of Scuderia Filipinetti was presented first at the Geneva Motor Show in March 1973 as the first Fiat X1/9 race car. It was built in cooperation with Fiat by the technician and racer Mike Parkes who later developed and built the Lancia Stratos. The Filipinetti had a 1290 cc engine with Lucas mechanical fuel injection and a Colotti five-speed gearbox. The power was about 160 PS (118 kW) at 8600 rpm with a top speed of 210 km/h (130 mph).

=== Abarth ===
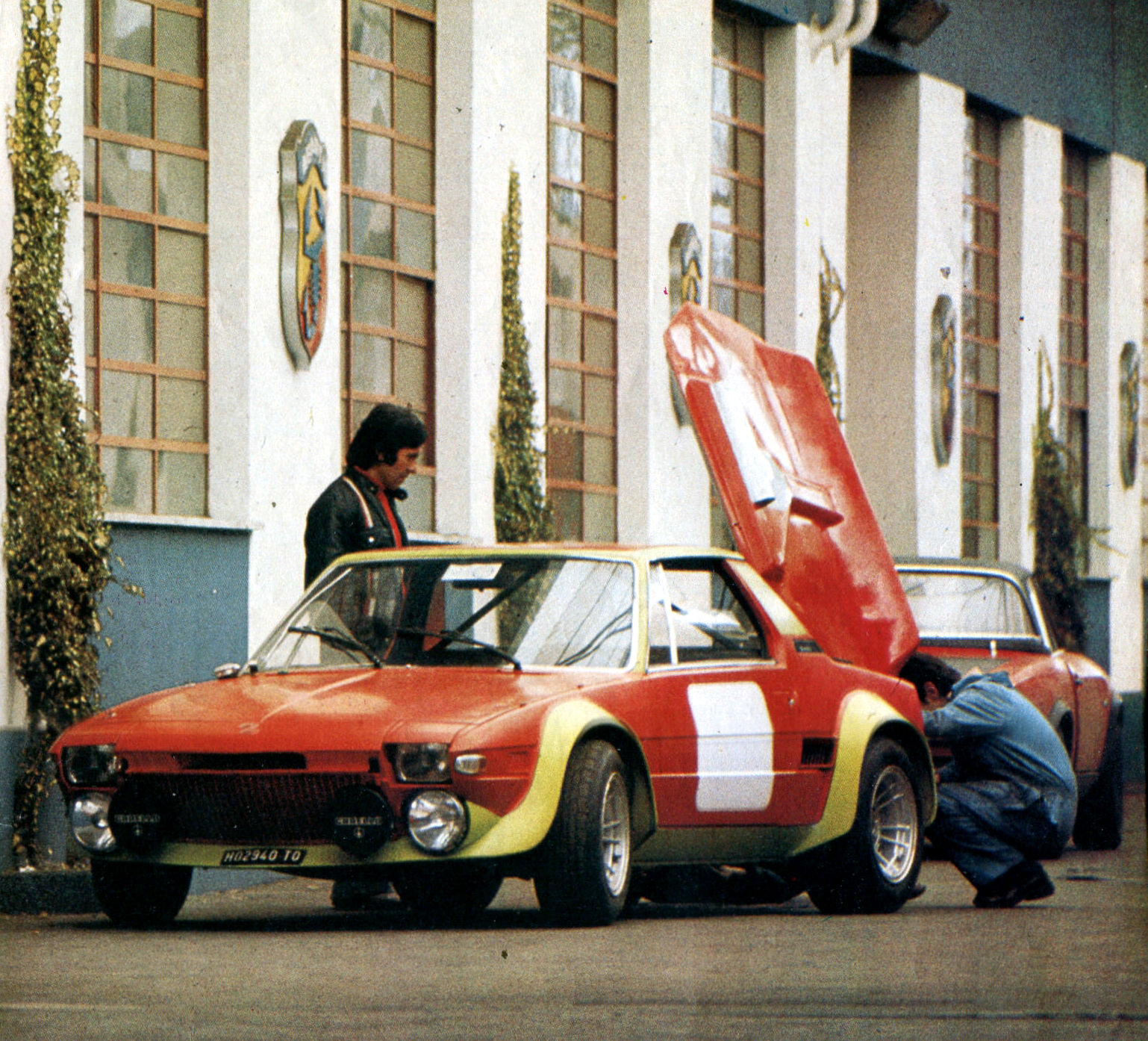
1974 Abarth X1-9 Prototipo in setup outside the Fiat's Abarth Competitions Centre in Turin

The Fiat subsidiary Abarth, in 1973, developed the Abarth X1/9 Prototipo to replace the 124 Spider Abarth as Fiat's main rally car. Ultimately, the parallel 131 Abarth project was chosen over the X1/9 as the main rally competition platform.

The X1/9 Prototipo used an 1840 cc engine (a bored out 1600 cc 124-derived unit) with a custom 16-valve cylinder head fed by twin 44 mm Weber IDF carburettors. Externally the cars sported flared wheel-arches, a small "duck tail" spoiler and an F1 style air intake designed to feed the carburettors cool air from above the cars roof. All the X1/9 Prototipos were raced in the traditional Abarth lime-green/yellow and orange/pink colour scheme.

The prototype nature of the X1/9 Prototipo project means that the exact number of cars produced is impossible to define. Components and entire body-shells were routinely swapped and replaced as part of the development process, but it is believed that 5 genuine cars were produced.

=== Dallara Icsunonove ===
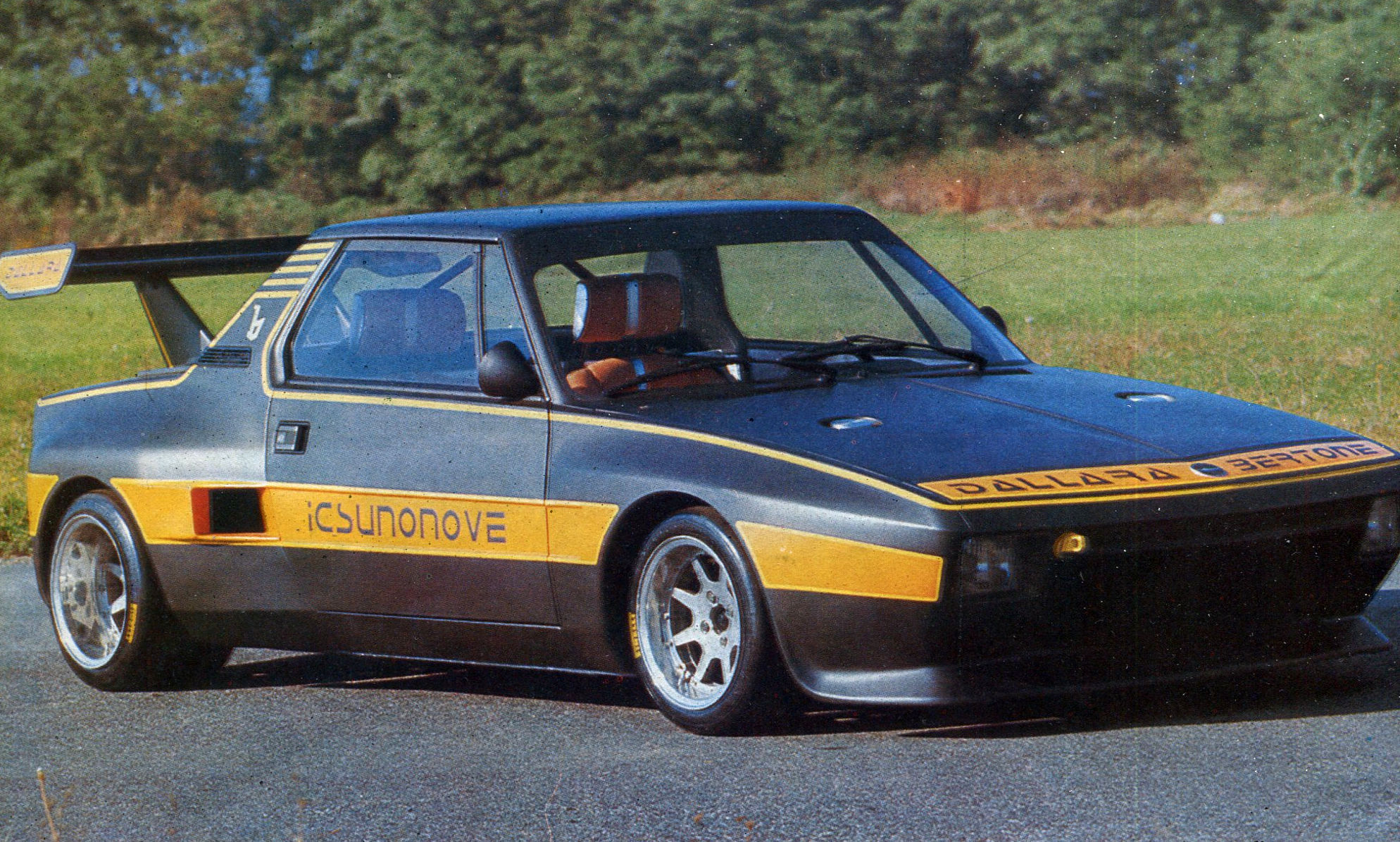
1975 Dallara Icsunonove

In 1975 the X1/9 was chosen by Dallara to enter the World Championship for Makes in the Group 5 Special Production class. The Dallara Icsunonove (the Italian pronunciation of "X1/9") featured a modified X1/9 engine with a custom 16-valve cylinder-head and fundamental suspension and body/monocoque alterations, the most obvious of which are the massively flared wheel-arches and the oversized rear wing.

== Kit conversions ==
=== Faran ===
The Faran Car Co. Ltd. was a UK based company that offered their Eliminator kit in both DIY and in-house assembled form. The design featured replacement fibreglass mouldings for the front and rear wings together with front and rear integrated bumper sections. The external modifications were completed by side sill skirts and a rear boot spoiler not dissimilar in style to that found on a De Tomaso Pantera. Faran also offered conversions using Lancia or Fiat Twin Cam engine units, although some owners opted to keep the original SOHC setup. Production of the Faran kits ended following a factory fire.

=== Eurosport ===
Eurosport (UK) Ltd. is an X1/9 parts specialist that produced two kit variants commonly referred to as the full and bolt-on kits. The full kit was a contender to the Faran version and utilises wide replacement fibreglass moldings for the front and rear wings, together with front and rear integrated bumper sections. Side skirts completed the styling which featured Ferrari Testarossa style side air intake mouldings ahead of the rear wheels. The bolt-on kit in contrast featured replacement front and rear integrated bumper sections that were moulded to blend with the standard wings. This allowed the 1500 alloy bumpers to be substituted with ease and offer a more modern appearance. Side sill skirts were also included in the bolt-on kit. Both kits are still available today.

=== Schult ===
The Schult X1/9 kit was produced in Germany and could again be likened to have taken some inspiration from the Testarossa style, but with more angular lines.

== Today ==
=== UK ===
As of December 2025, 355 X1/9s are road legal in the UK. There is an active owners club and over 900 registered SORN. The club produces a quarterly magazine, attends and organises events, and provides car maintenance advice.

=== USA and Canada ===
While over 100,000 of the approximately 160,000 X1/9s produced by Fiat and Bertone were sold in the USA and Canada, according to the latest available figures (from the Q3 of 2018), 1,034 X1/9s were legally plated for road operation in the USA and 115 were legally plated for road operation in Canada.

== See also ==
- Corona Dardo, a Fiat X1/9 replica sold by Fiat dealers in Brazil.

== Notes ==
^{Note 1} The correct Italian pronunciation of X1/9 is Icsunonove: 'x' (ics) 'one' (uno) 'nine' (nove); phonetically iks-oo-no-nov-eh. The typical English pronunciation is 'x-one-nine'.
