= Fiat Ritmo =

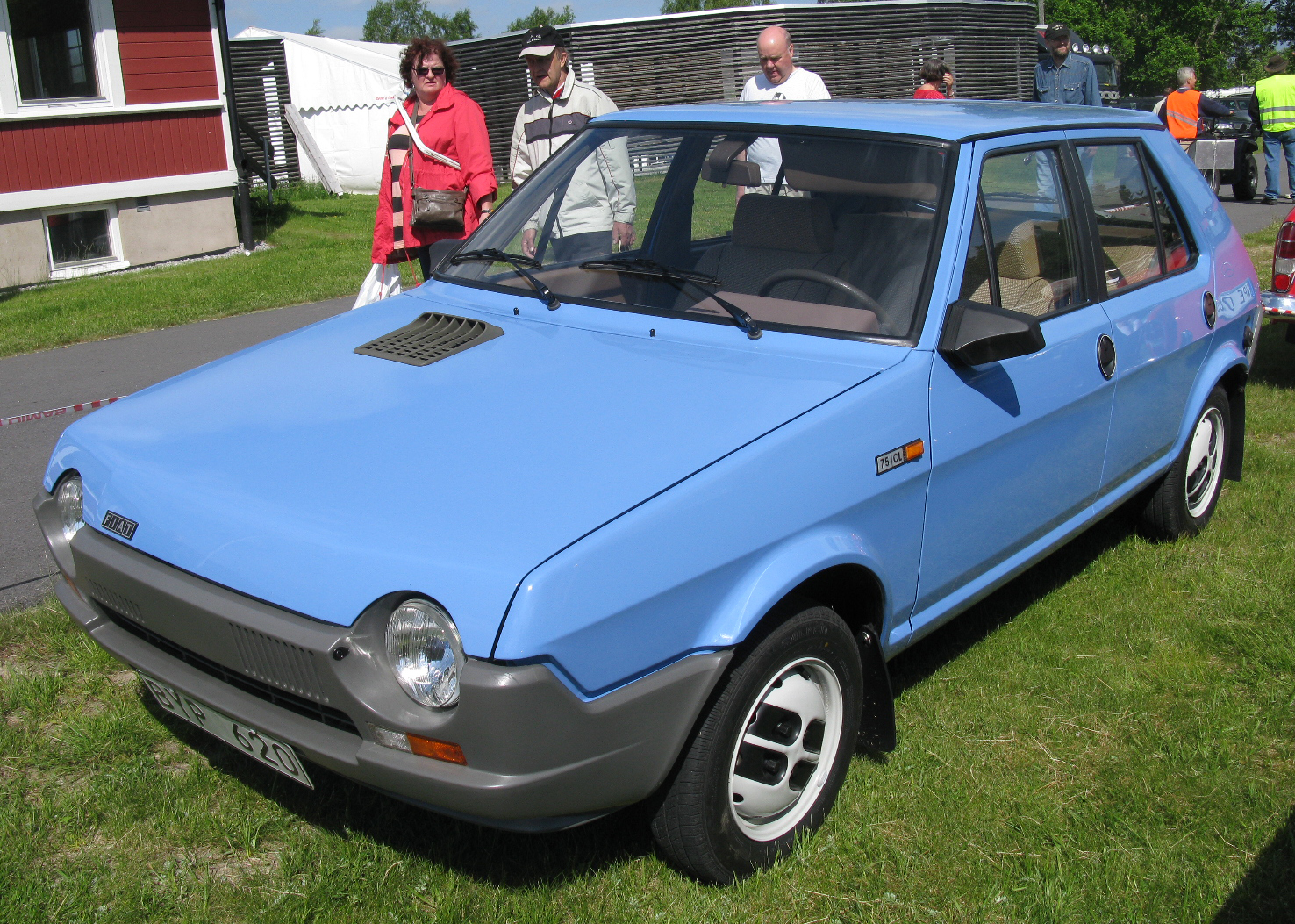

Overview
- Manufacturer: Fiat
- Also called: Fiat Strada; SEAT Ritmo; Nasr Ritmo (Egypt)
- Production: 1978–1988
- Assembly: Italy: Cassino, Rivalta; Spain: Barcelona; Egypt: Cairo (Nasr)
- Designer: Pierangelo Andreani (1971) and Sergio Sartorelli at Centro Stile Fiat; Bertone (Cabrio)

Body and chassis
- Class: Small family car (C)
- Body style: 3/5-door hatchback; 2-door cabriolet
- Layout: Front-engine, front-wheel-drive
- Related: Fiat Regata; Lancia Delta; SEAT Malaga; SEAT Ronda

Powertrain
- Engine: 1049 cc Brazil I4; 1116 cc I4; 1301 cc I4; 1498 cc I4; 1585 cc 138 AR.000 twin cam I4; 1995 cc 138 AR1/AR2 twin cam I4; 1714 cc diesel I4; 1929 cc turbodiesel I4
- Transmission: 4/5-speed manual; 3-speed automatic (VW)

Dimensions
- Wheelbase: 2,448 mm (96.4 in) MkI; 2,444 mm (96.2 in) MkII; 2,432 mm (95.7 in) (Ritmo Abarth)
- Length: 3,937 mm (155.0 in)
- Width: 1,650 mm (65.0 in); 1,663 mm (65.5 in) (Sport/Abarth)
- Height: 1,400 mm (55.1 in)
- Kerb weight: 850–955 kg (1,874–2,105 lb)

Chronology
- Predecessor: Fiat 128
- Successor: Fiat Tipo

The Fiat Ritmo is a small family car which was manufactured and marketed by Fiat from 1978 to 1988 with two facelifts. It has a front-engine, front-wheel drive layout and was offered as a three-door or five-door hatchback or as a two-door cabriolet. Export versions for the UK, US and Canada were marketed as the Fiat Strada. In 1979, SEAT Ritmo production began under licence by SEAT in Spain, which was restyled in 1982 to become the SEAT Ronda.

The Ritmo was styled by Sergio Sartorelli at Fiat's Centro Stile in Turin and was launched in April 1978 at the Turin Motor show. The name Ritmo derives from the Italian for "rhythm", and Strada derives from the Italian for "road." Production reached a total of 1,790,000 and ended in early 1988 it was replaced by the Fiat Tipo.

== Development ==
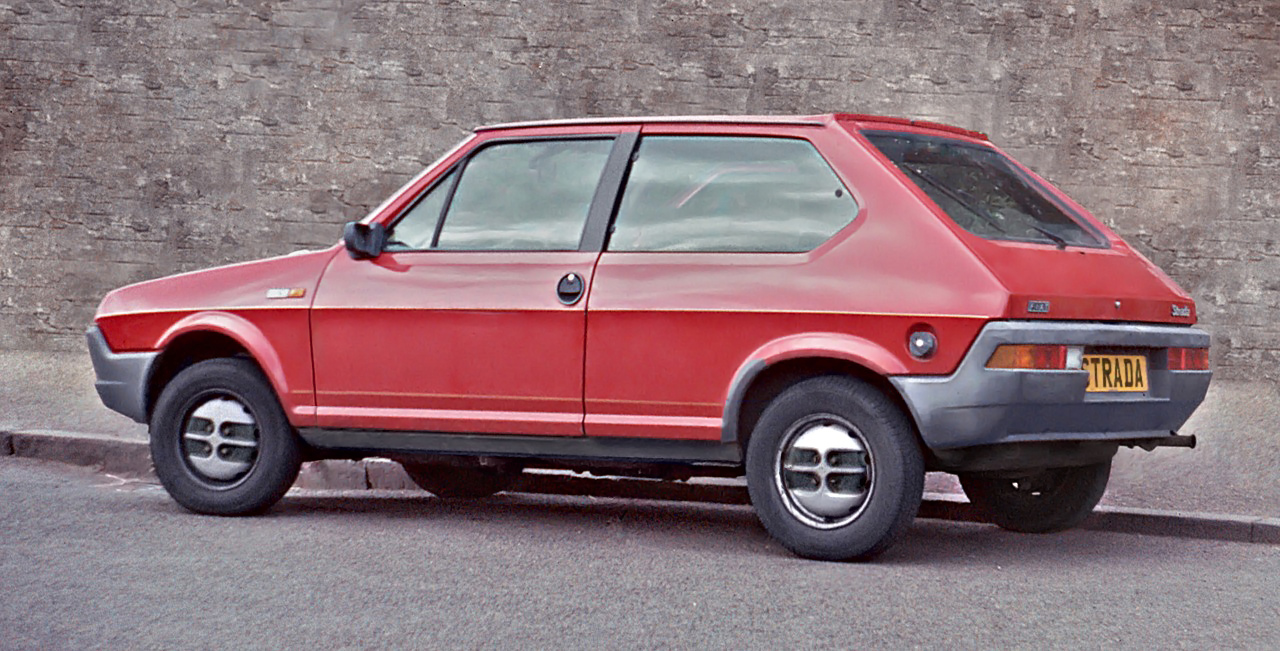
A first-series Fiat Strada (UK)

Fiat began designing the Ritmo hatchback – as a replacement for the 128 sedan – in 1972, following the body style of its 127 supermini as European manufacturers began launching small family hatchbacks, notably the Volkswagen Golf in 1974.

Prior to its launch, the press speculated that the project codename 138 would be the final production name, however, Fiat instead gave its new car the Ritmo name, rather than another three digit number.

The Ritmo was manufactured at the Cassino plant using a system developed by its subsidiary Comau, the "Robogate" system – which automated the bodyshell assembly and welding process using robots, giving rise to its advertising slogan "Handbuilt by robots", immortalised in a television advertising campaign showing the robots assembling the Ritmo bodyshells to the strains of Rossini's The Barber of Seville. The exterior has plastic bumper fascias integrated into the styling which combined strong round shapes with overall sharp lines, achieving a drag coefficient of Cd=0.38. The plastic bumpers also resisted damage from impacts of speeds of up to 6 km/h (3.7 mph).

=== First series (1978) ===
The initial four-cylinder engine range included 1.1-litre (60 PS [44 kW]), 1.3-litre (65 PS [48 kW]) and 1.5-litre (75 PS [55 kW]) petrol engines, inherited from the Fiat 128, although the engines were noticeably quieter in the more insulated Ritmo. Suspension was independent all-round, the braking system comprised front discs and rear drums and the wheels measured 13-inch in diameter. Gearboxes ranged from a standard four-speed manual (five-speed optional on CL models) and an optional three-speed Volkswagen-derived automatic. Its boot capacity ranged from 330 to 1,100 litres (with the rear seats folded).

The Ritmo finished second in the European Car of the Year awards, finishing narrowly behind the winning car, the Simca-Chrysler Horizon – which was similar in concept. The initial range in Italy was designated by their respective engine horsepower (PS):

- 60 L (3- and 5-door, priced L4,407,000 to 4,608,000) (prices in lire)
- 60 CL (3- and 5-door, priced L4,679,000 to 4,879,000)
- 65 L (5-door, priced L4,726,000)
- 65 CL (3- and 5-door, priced L4,797,000 to 4,997,000)

The CL range were the better-equipped models (with the 60 CL comprising 80% of total initial sales in Italy) and the whole range also distinguished itself by having numerous optional accessories unseen in past Fiat cars. These included: larger tyres; a rev counter; stereo system; safety seatbelts and headrests; passenger-side rear view mirror; split-fold rear seat; tinted windows; rear window wiper; rear window defroster; metallic paint; sunroof (the most expensive at L259.60). The instrumentation was incorporated in a rectangular pod with modular slots that could house various gauges and switches, either standard depending on the model or optional (e.g. digital clock and switches for hazard lights or adjustable-speed ventilation fan). Export markets also received the 1.5-litre 75 CL with a five-speed manual, a model which was initially unavailable in the domestic Italian market.

The colour of the interiors was determined by the external paint, as follows:

- beige interior: azzurro rodi (light blue), rosso cina (red), verde Kent (green) and metallic verde medio (medium green);
- blue interior: bianco yacht (white), blu lord (royal blue) and metallic azzurro (light blue) and alluminio (silver);
- brown interior: arancio messico (orange), grigio jet (grey) and metallic rosso rame (copper).

The Ritmo was criticized for its basic interior trim (e.g. no fabric on door panels). Fiat responded in 1979 with various revisions and the introduction of the Targa Oro ("gold plate") range. The latter was based on the Ritmo 65 (or 75 for export markets) and was distinguished by mink or black paint with gold striping and accents in the alloy wheels, foglights, dark bumper bars and velour trim interiors. From February 1979, the 75 CL range had an optional VW-derived automatic transmission – the Automatica was the only 1.5-engined version marketed in Italy. At the same time, the 60 L models for Italy and some export markets had its 1.1-litre 128-derived engine replaced by a 1049 cc petrol engine built by Fiat of Brazil. Through the use of a new carburetor and altered timing, power and torque figures were kept the same as those of the 1.1, up by ten horsepower over what the engine produced as installed in the 127. The 60 CL - the fastest-selling Ritmo in the Italian market at the time - continued to use the comparable 1116 cc engine.

At the 1980 Geneva Motor Show, a five-door only diesel version – marketed as the Ritmo D and available in both L and CL trim – was introduced with a 1,714 cc engine (55 PS or 40 kW or 54 bhp). To accommodate this considerably heavier engine, the steering rack was slowed down (from 3.5 to 4 turns) and the suspension adjusted. Nonetheless, a 65.5% forward weight distribution was hard to mask and both handling and braking suffered when compared to petrol-powered Ritmos.

In 1981, the Targa Oro and 75 models were replaced by the five-door only Ritmo Super (or Superstrada in some export markets). They brought higher specification and fittings (from chrome trimmings to a more complete instrumentation and optional central locking), larger, 14-inch, wheels and, most significantly, revised engines with 75 PS (55 kW) (1300) and 85 PS (63 kW) (1500). This extra power was gained through slight alterations to the camshaft profile, a twin carburettor, and a twin exhaust system. Other differences included lower profile tyres (Pirelli P8) and a close-ratio five-speed manual gearbox. The steering was also somewhat faster. By this time, the Ritmo range in Italy also included three- and five-door manual versions of the 75 CL and three-door 75 CL Automatica, with the price of the popular 60CL now ranging from L6,868,000 to L7,180,000 for the three- and five-door versions, respectively.

In May 1981, the first sports version, the Ritmo 105 TC, was launched. Available only as a three-door, it was powered by a 105 PS (77 kW; 104 bhp) Fiat DOHC engine with a displacement of 1,585 cc, which was derived from that used in the 131 and 132 models. This car had the same 14-inch wheels as the Ritmo Super, but with black centre hubcaps. British and Irish models had black and silver Speedline alloy wheels (5.5 x 14) as standard. Other distinguishing features relative to the normal range included: front fog lights integrated into the front bumper; integrated front spoiler combined with wheel arch extensions; black lower door paint; black mesh air intake; and a rear spoiler at the base of the rear window. That same year, Fiat also launched the Ritmo Cabrio.

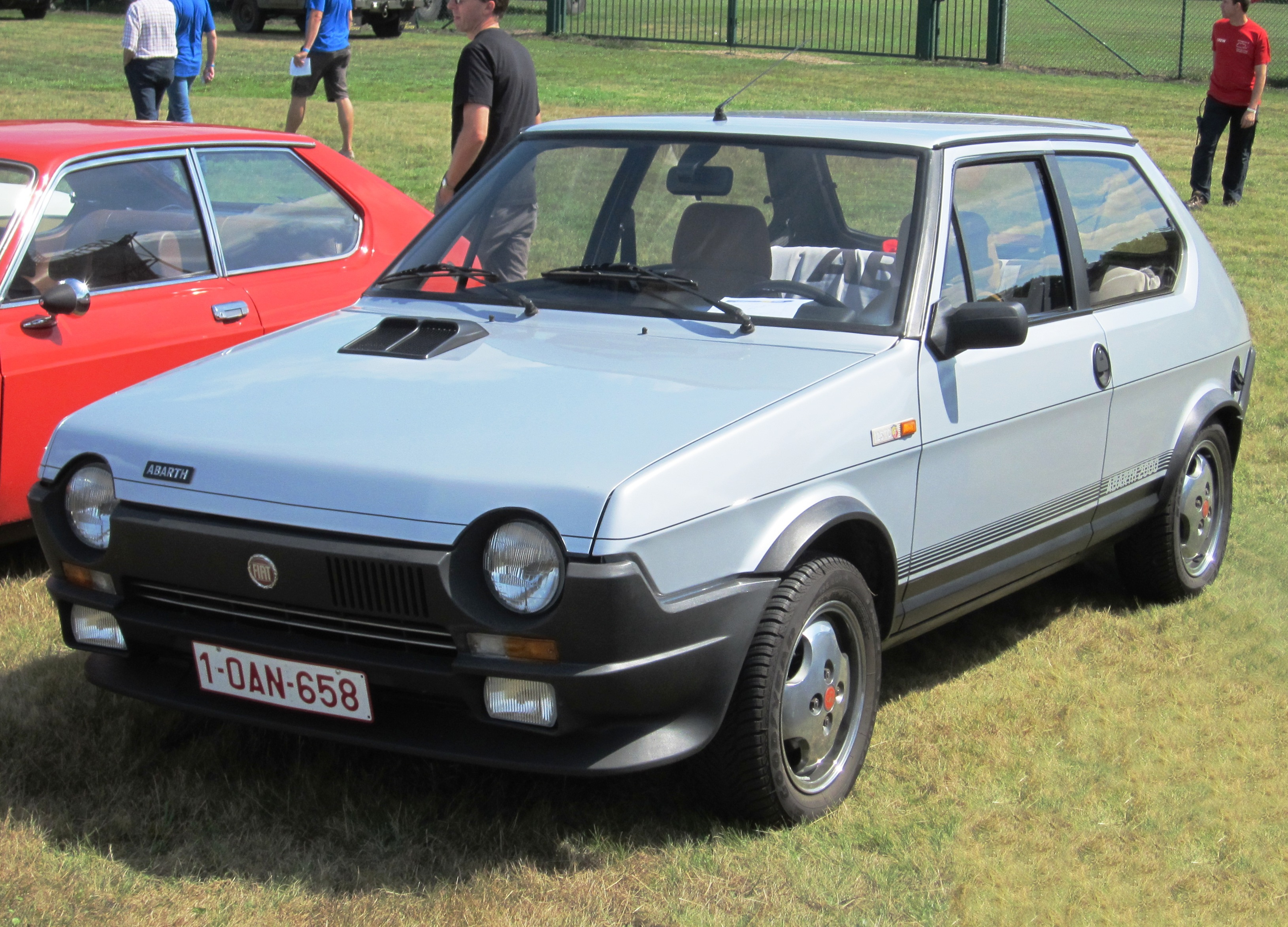
Fiat Ritmo Abarth 125 TC

In September 1981, Fiat displayed the Ritmo Abarth 125 TC at the Frankfurt Motor Show. This model was not available for right-hand export markets because the position of the exhaust downpipe did not allow for a relocated steering column and system. The 125 TC was a modified and revised 105 TC with a 1,995 cc DOHC four with 125 PS (92 kW), ventilated front discs, a new five-speed ZF manual gearbox, revised suspension settings and strengthened components. Outwardly, the 125 TC differed only slightly from the 105 TC – it gained the chunky four-spoke 14 in alloys later seen on the Bertone Cabrio models, featured an "Abarth" red and black badge on the rear hatch, and the side badges featured the Abarth "Scorpion". The 125 TC version had a top speed of 190 km/h (118 mph) and it could accelerate from 0 to 100 km/h (62 mph) in 8.7 seconds. These cars were the last ones assembled on a separate Abarth production line, following the Fiat buyout in 1971.

=== Second series (1982) ===
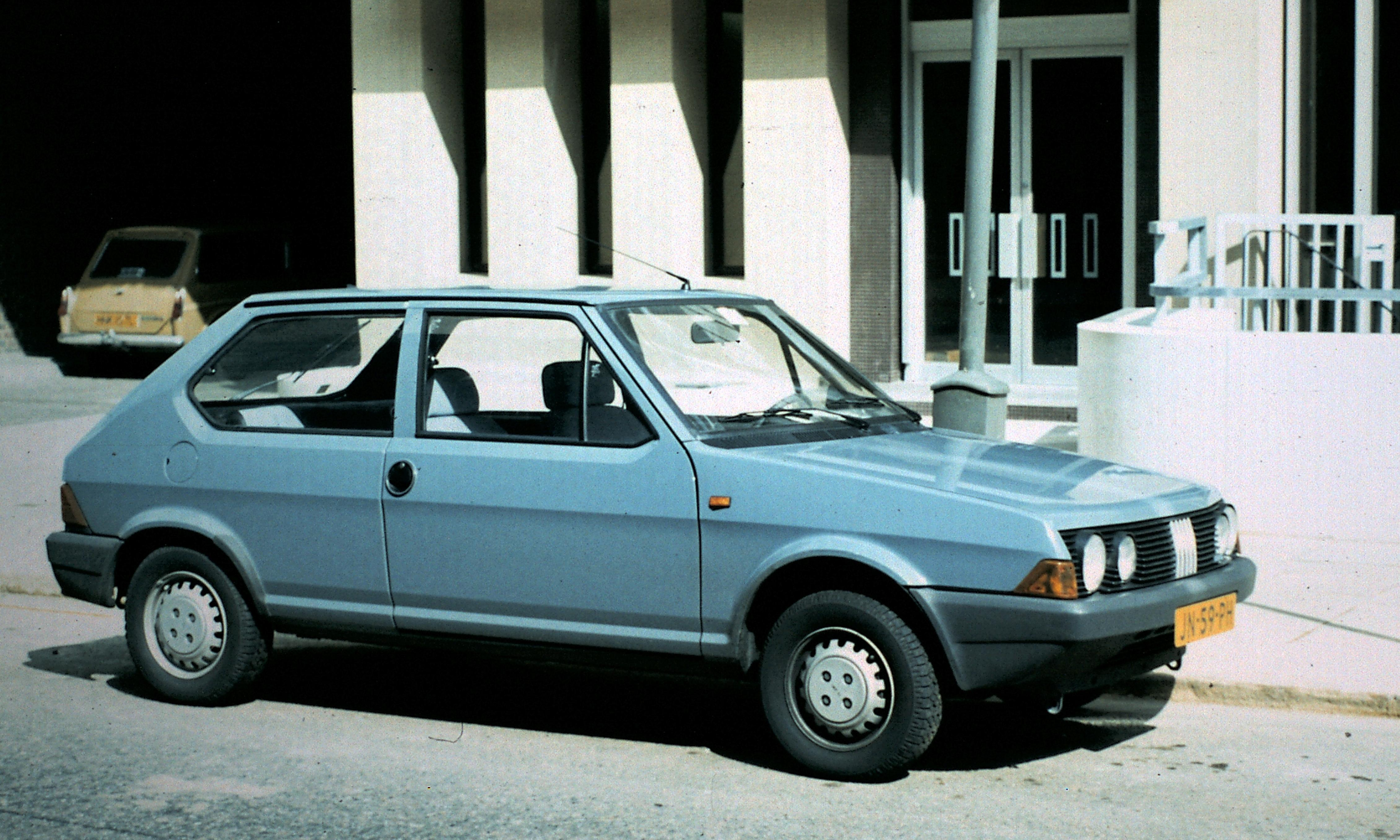
A second-series Fiat Ritmo 3-door

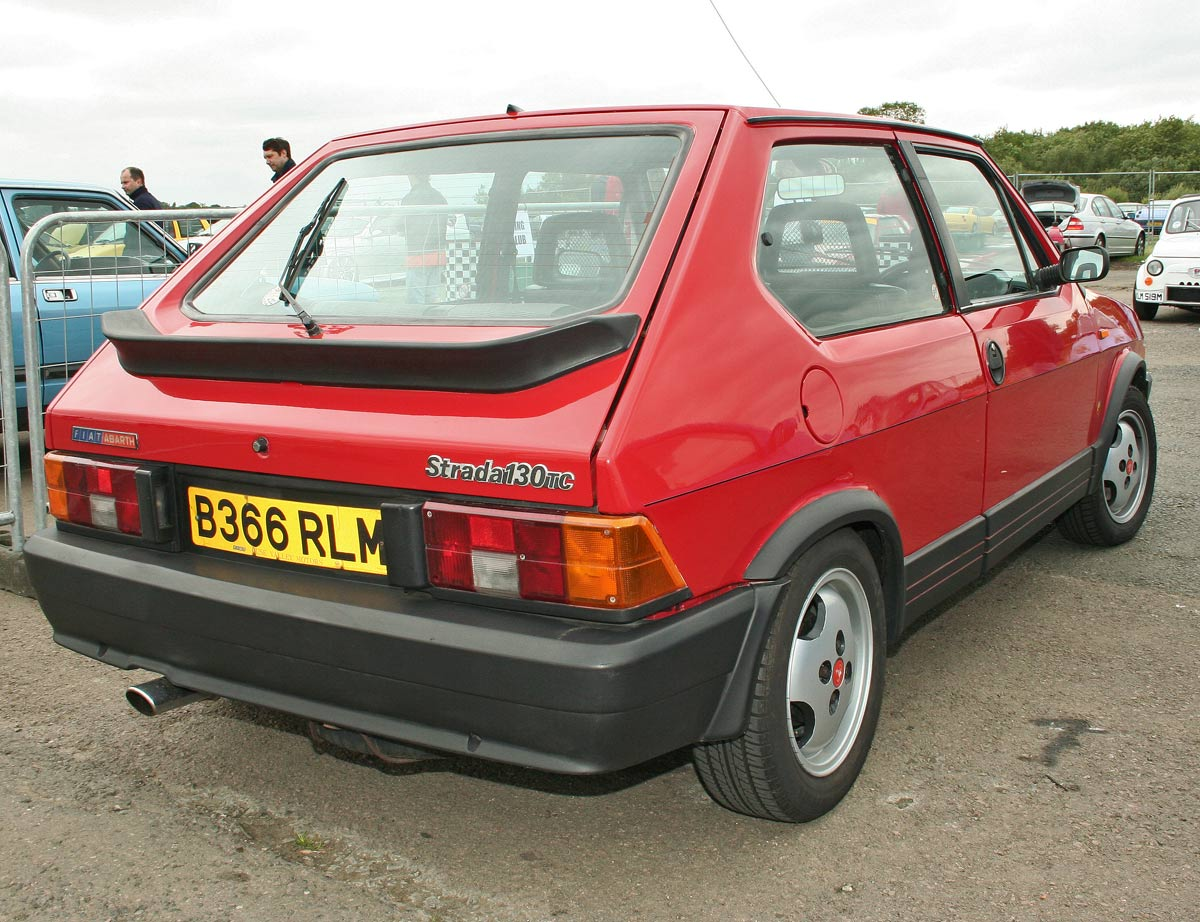
A second-series Fiat Strada Abarth 130 TC

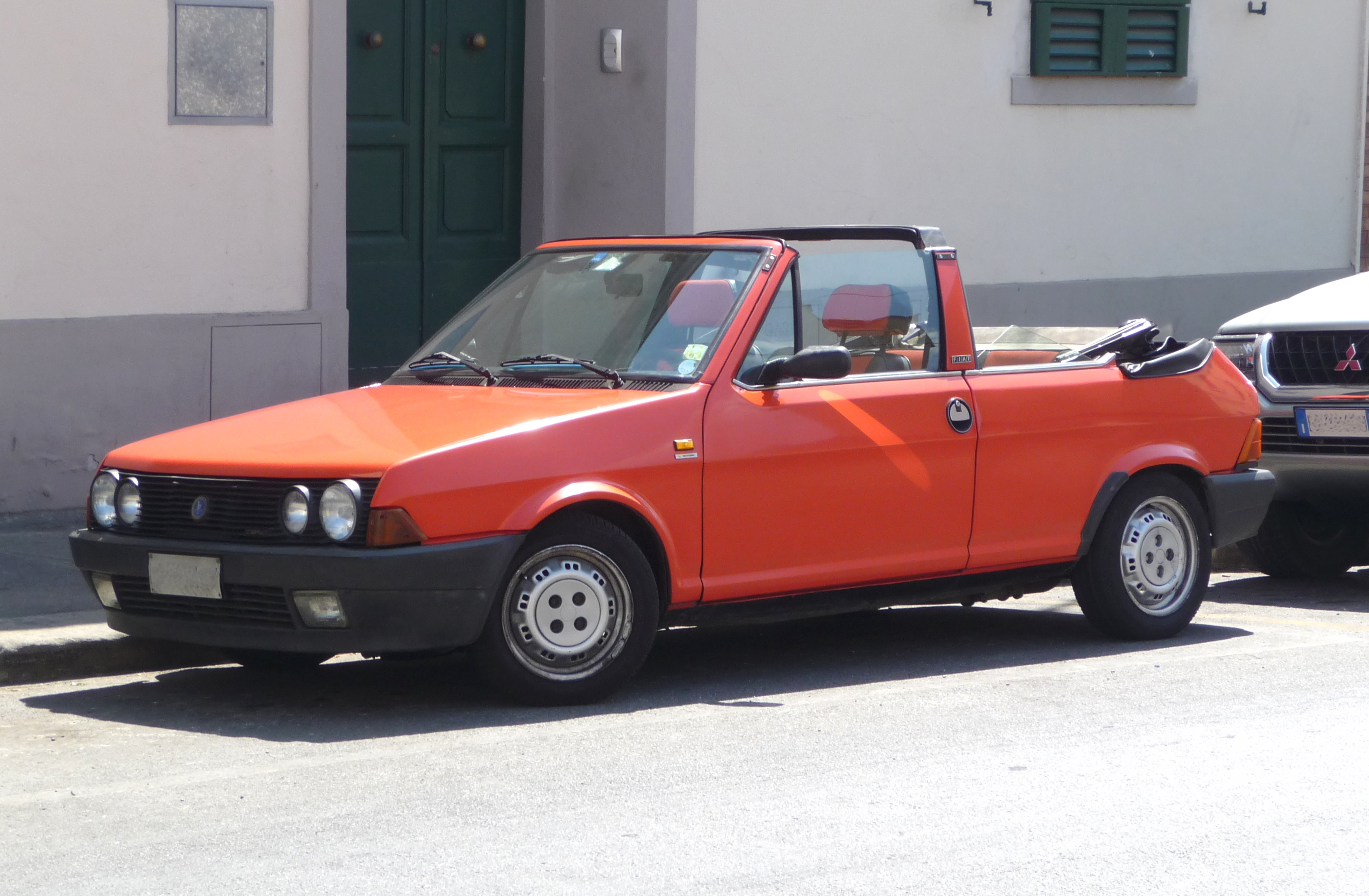
A second-series Fiat/Bertone Ritmo Cabrio

In October 1982, the Ritmo was reengineered and restyled to improve its competitiveness against rivals, which included the MK3 Ford Escort and the first front-wheel drive Opel Kadett (Vauxhall Astra in the UK). The chassis was lighter by 70 kg (154 lb) and benefitted from better noise, vibration and harshness (NVH) control. Suspension mounts were altered and the spare tyre was moved from the engine bay to the boot, along with a relocation of the fuel tank to ahead of the rear axle. The fuel tank move resulted in the fuel cap being moved to the right side and under a lid instead of remaining exposed. The facelift saw the Ritmo acquire a more conventional look. For example, the round headlights no longer intersected the bumper bar but were now integrated in a separate grille, and the tail lights were similarly integrated into the body instead of inset in the rear bumper. In addition, all models now featured Fiat's new corporate five-bar emblem at the centre of the grille, with base models featuring single round headlamps and all other, double round headlights (in Britain, all models of this generation featured twin headlamps). The bonnet no longer had an air scoop and the roof was now completely flat (with the upward sweep of the first series found to cause vortices and contribute to dust and water over the rear window). The 1,049 cc "Brazil" engine was discontinued. Better aerodynamics, lower weight, and engine optimizations combined to increase fuel mileage by around ten percent on most of the range.

The 105 TC was relaunched with revised interior trim, a dashboard similar to that of the earlier Ritmo Super and an upper hatchback spoiler in place of the lower one. In Britain, seven-spoke alloy wheels replaced the earlier Speedline ones. In British advertising the car was named Strada II, but it was badged as the Strada. The North American version was unchanged but was finally discontinued at the end of the 1982 model year (at which time the Fiat range included only the X1/9 and the 124 Spider).

In 1983, Fiat completed the range with the Ritmo ES ("energy saving") models and the hot hatch, Ritmo Abarth 130 TC. The latter was based on the 125 TC but was powered by a 1995 cc engine with power output increased to 130 PS (96 kW). This was achieved by replacing the single Weber carb used in the 125 TC with twin Solex/Weber carburettors on a side-draught manifold, and via improved cam profiles. The 130 TC had a top speed of 195 km/h (121 mph) and accelerated from 0 to 100 km/h (62 mph) in 7.8 seconds. It was fitted with Recaro bucket seats in Britain and Ireland (optional in Europe) and it remained one of the few 1980s European hot hatches to continue to utilise carburettors instead of fuel injection. Ignition timing was controlled electronically. Although appearing outwardly similar to the restyled 105 TC with its lower door and wheelarch trims, the 130 TC could be distinguished by its polished four-spoke alloy wheels (continued from the earlier 125 TC), aerodynamic perspex front door wind deflectors, and lower hatchback spoiler. The powerful twin-cam was mated to a close ratio five-speed ZF manual gearbox and had superior performance to its contemporary rivals, which included the Volkswagen Golf GTI, Ford Escort XR3i, Vauxhall Astra GTE and the MG Maestro.

A second-series Ritmo 125TC was made available for 1983 only in Austria and Switzerland. It was externally identical to the 130TC, but featured a single carburettor, which reduced power to comply with tax regulations in those two countries.

There was a minor change in the spring of 1984, mainly consisting of a new range hierarchy. Aside from the three-door, four-speed "L" versions ("60" and "diesel"), all non-sporting Ritmos now had five-speed manual gearboxes and five-door bodywork. The upper-class 85 Super version was dropped in Italy, where smaller-engined versions ruled the marketplace. The 1.1 litre 60 Super models were new to the lineup.

This Ritmo (and the third series) was also built in Venezuela, only in the five-door version. Two models were available: the 85 and the 105TC, with the 85 only available with the automatic transmission from Volkswagen and the 105TC being a five-speed manual. Unique to Venezuela was the fact that the 105TC was not offered in a three-door version, the only option available in the rest of the world.

=== Third series (1985) ===
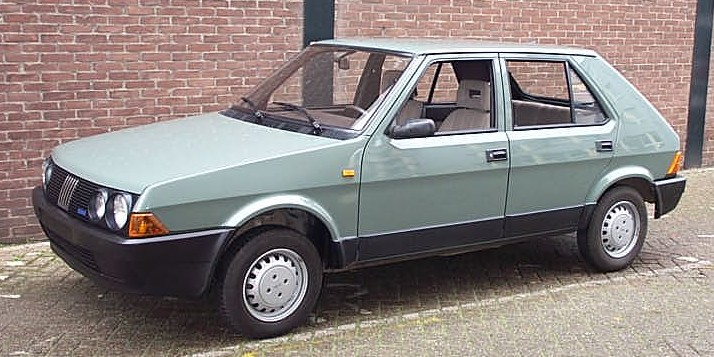
A third-series Fiat Ritmo

1985 saw a minor facelift to the Ritmo range, featuring new rectangular door handles on five-door versions (the three-door retained circular door handles), shared with the Regata – the Ritmo-derived sedan. Other changes included restyled front and rear bumpers, and lower plastic panels on the doors (again, taken from the Regata). The rear bumper now housed the number plate at low level, whilst the space between the rear lights was filled with a plastic panel. The 1,714 cc diesel engine was replaced with a 1,697 cc unit from the Uno 60D, developing 60 PS (44 kW). The three-door 105 TC model was replaced by the five-door Ritmo 100 S (fitted with the unchanged 1,585 cc 105 PS (77 kW) DOHC engine from the former 105 TC). The 130 TC Abarth benefitted from the same external changes as the other models, in addition to new wheels and interior trim. In 1986, a new diesel version was launched with a 1,929 cc intercooled turbodiesel (80 PS [59 kW]), and was badged as the Ritmo Turbo DS (as a five-door only). While marketed across continental Europe, the 100 S and the Turbo DS were not sold in Great Britain or Ireland, nor were any of the fuel injected models. The latter included the 75 i.e. and 90 i.e., which had lower outputs due to their catalytic converters fitted to meet tougher export markets' emission regulations. By this stage, however, Ritmo/Strada sales were declining outside Italy, not helped by its reputation for unreliability and rust, nor the growing number of competitors which were appearing. However, the Ritmo's falling popularity in these markets was compensated for by the growing success of its smaller stablemate, the Uno.

To spur more sales, in 1986 Fiat launched two limited editions:

- the Ritmo Team (with 60 and D engines and based on a five-door CL) in May; and
- the Ritmo Super Team (with 60, 70 and 100 engines fitted with central locking, power windows and adjustable steering wheel).

Early in 1988, the production of the Ritmo ended after 10 years. In its place, as the new contender in the European C-segment, Fiat launched the similarly avantgarde, Tipo, which took inspiration from the smaller Uno with its design and style.

== Other models or variants ==
The Fiat Ritmo cabrio was originally displayed as a concept at the 1979 Frankfurt Motor Show but went on sale in mainland Europe only in 1981. It was assembled by Bertone and, coinciding with the 1982 facelift, was badged as a Bertone instead of a Fiat. It was cheaper than, and competed against, the Volkswagen Golf cabriolet but was not up to Volkswagen standards in terms of quality or ability, despite the fact that the German rival was not built in-house, but by Karmann.

With the introduction of the Series 2 cars, Fiat began manufacture of a RHD Ritmo Cabrio, which was offered in the UK (Superstrada Cabrio) and Ireland (Ritmo Cabrio) only in 85S (Superstrada) guise.

The Bertone cabriolet was sold in various European markets in petrol-engined form only (75S, 85S, 100S; some with fuel injection) until 1988. There were various special editions including the Ritmo Cabrio Chrono and Ritmo Cabrio Bianco (all white).

A sedan version, the Regata, was launched in 1983 with limited success outside of Italy despite being sold more globally, including in Australia. Mechanically similar to the Ritmo, the sedan was offered with 1.3, 1.5 and 1.6-litre petrol engines, and diesel 1.7 and 1.9-litre or 1.9-litre turbodiesel engines. A station wagon version—badged the Regata Weekend—was launched in 1984 and a unique design feature was represented by its folding rear bumper section, which created a level loading bay. The Regata received a minor facelift in 1986 (bumpers, doors and interior) as well as fuel injection fitted for some engines – most notably the 1,585 cc "100S i.e."

Starting 1980, in the United States, U.S. Electricar converted Fiat Strada models into EVs and called them Lectric Leopard 946A. They featured 16 6V lead-acid batteries (8 under the hood, 8 in the trunk) and a 17.2 kW (23.1 hp) 96 Volt General Electric engine. The car maintained its original 5-speed gearbox, suspension setup, brakes, wheels and tires. Its top speed was 65 mph (105 km/h) and its range was 60 mi (97 km) if not driven faster than 50 mph (80 km/h). The Lectric Leopard 946A's weight was 3,288 lb (1,491 kg), about 65% more than the original Strada's. The agreement between U.S. Electricar and Fiat concerned 2,500–5,000 Strada cars, of which 1,750 were to be delivered by Fiat without engine, to save costs.

== Alternative names ==
=== Fiat Strada ===
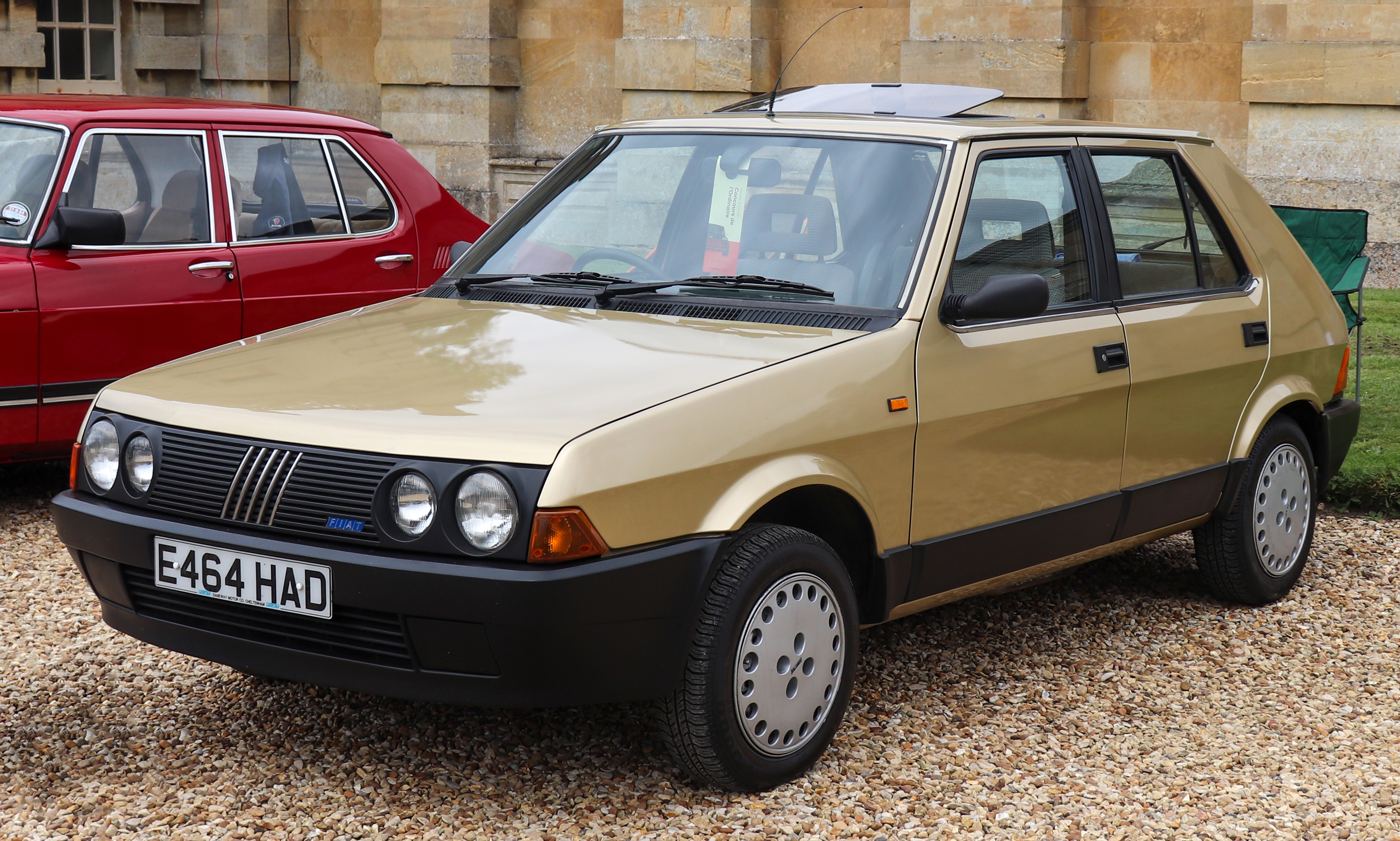
A 1988 Fiat Strada 85 Super (UK)

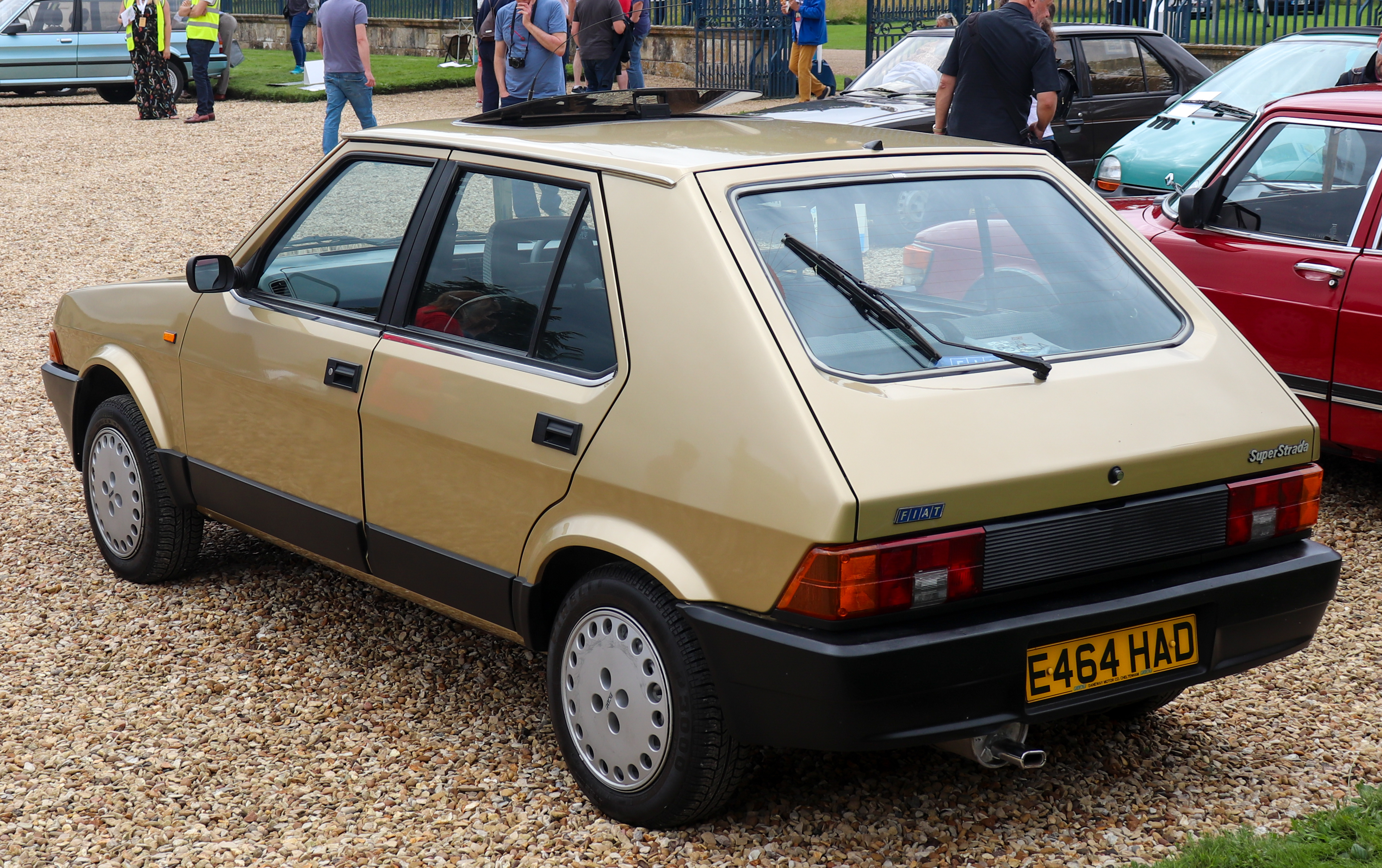

The Ritmo was sold on the British market as the Strada from the autumn of 1978 until it was replaced by the Tipo in July 1988. Despite decent early sales, surprising given its unconventional styling, it was soon overshadowed by a host of new British-built and imported competitors, and by the 1980s was selling very slowly, although Fiat's overall market share in the UK increased sharply throughout the 1980s due to the huge success of the smaller Uno.

In North America, the Fiat Strada was introduced in January 1979 (for the same model year) to replace the 128. Strict North American collision standards resulted in this Strada featuring extended plastic bumper bars. Available with either three or five doors, it used the same 1.5-litre SOHC engine as the X1/9 coupé, generating 69 hp (51 kW), and featured a standard five-speed manual gearbox or a three-speed automatic from Volkswagen as optional equipment. For 1981 the engine gained fuel injection for all states, meaning that power increased to 75 hp (56 kW). In spite of excellent fuel economy, a roomy interior, and comfortable ride, the Strada failed to convince enough buyers to forget reliability issues from previous Fiat models and the model was withdrawn from North America in 1982, signifying the end of Fiat's presence there although the Spider and X1/9 lingered on for another few years.

The US target sales number had been 30,000 per year. Sales in calendar year 1979 (the best year for the Strada, in spite of strikes restricting supplies of the five-speed unit) were 12,285 examples followed by 12,253 in 1980 (the first full year). Sales dropped precipitously thereafter - down to 6,888 examples in 1981, 4,478 in 1982, followed by 533 leftovers in 1983 and a final 40 registrations during 1984. A total of 36,477 Stradas were sold in the United States over the four model years it was available. One of the owners of these was Barack Obama, who drove a Strada as his first car.

=== SEAT Ritmo ===
Spanish car maker SEAT began their history as a Fiat licensee from 1948, manufacturing clones of the Italian cars. From 1979 to 1982, a Spanish version of the Ritmo, the SEAT Ritmo, was produced in Spain. The original SEAT Ritmo was equipped with licence-built pushrod engines from the old Fiat 124.

The end of the above partnership began in 1982, coinciding with a new SEAT logo and the launch of the "System Porsche"-engined SEAT Ronda, which remained in production until 1986. An intellectual property dispute arose and was ultimately resolved by the Arbitration Chamber of Paris in 1983, which found that the Ronda was sufficiently different from the Ritmo (much to the angst of Fiat due to rumours that its restyle was very close to that of the Ronda). As part of this dispute, SEAT showed a black Ronda with all the in-house developed components painted in bright yellow, in order to highlight key differences between the two products.

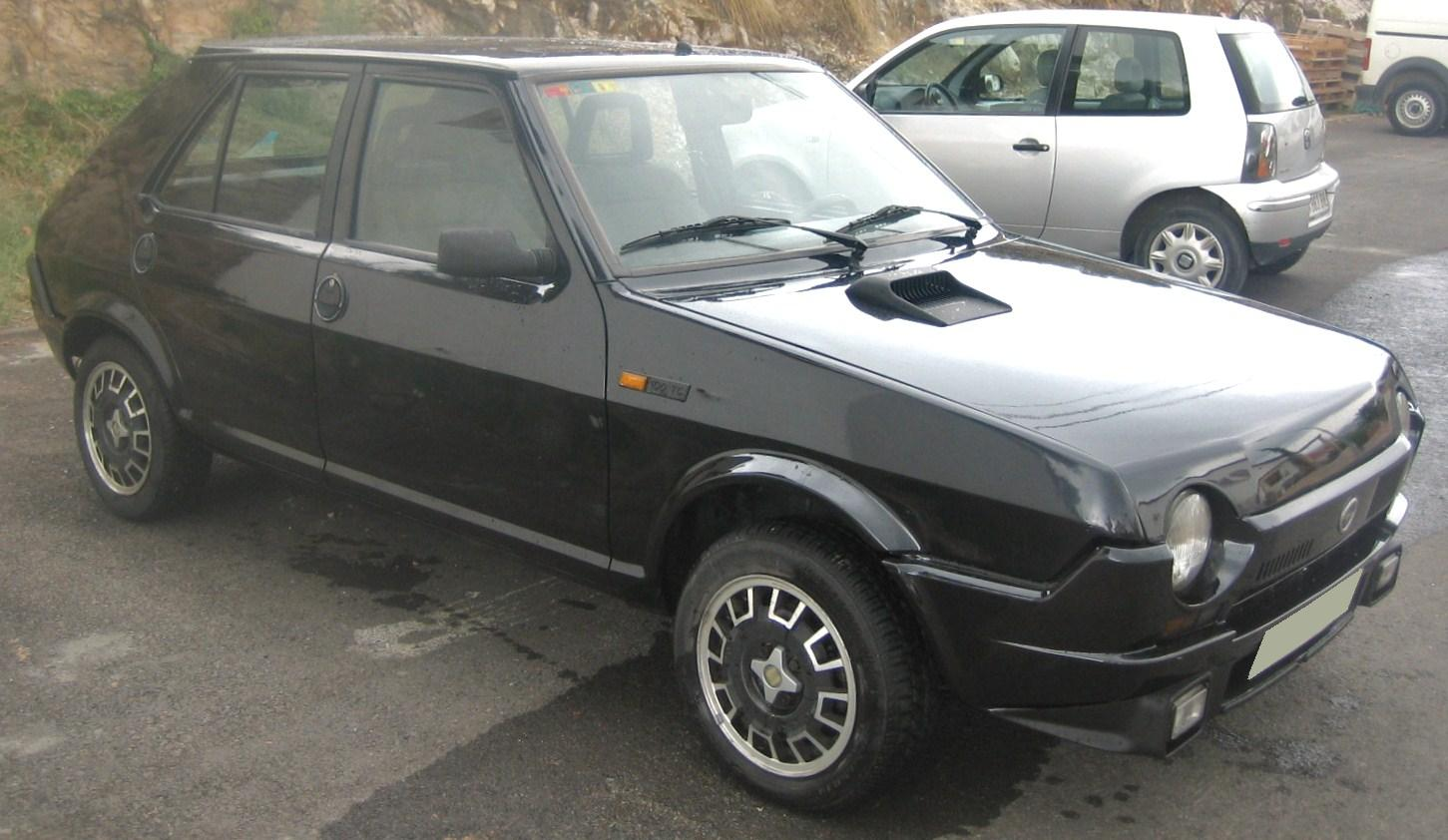
Seat Ritmo 100 TC Crono

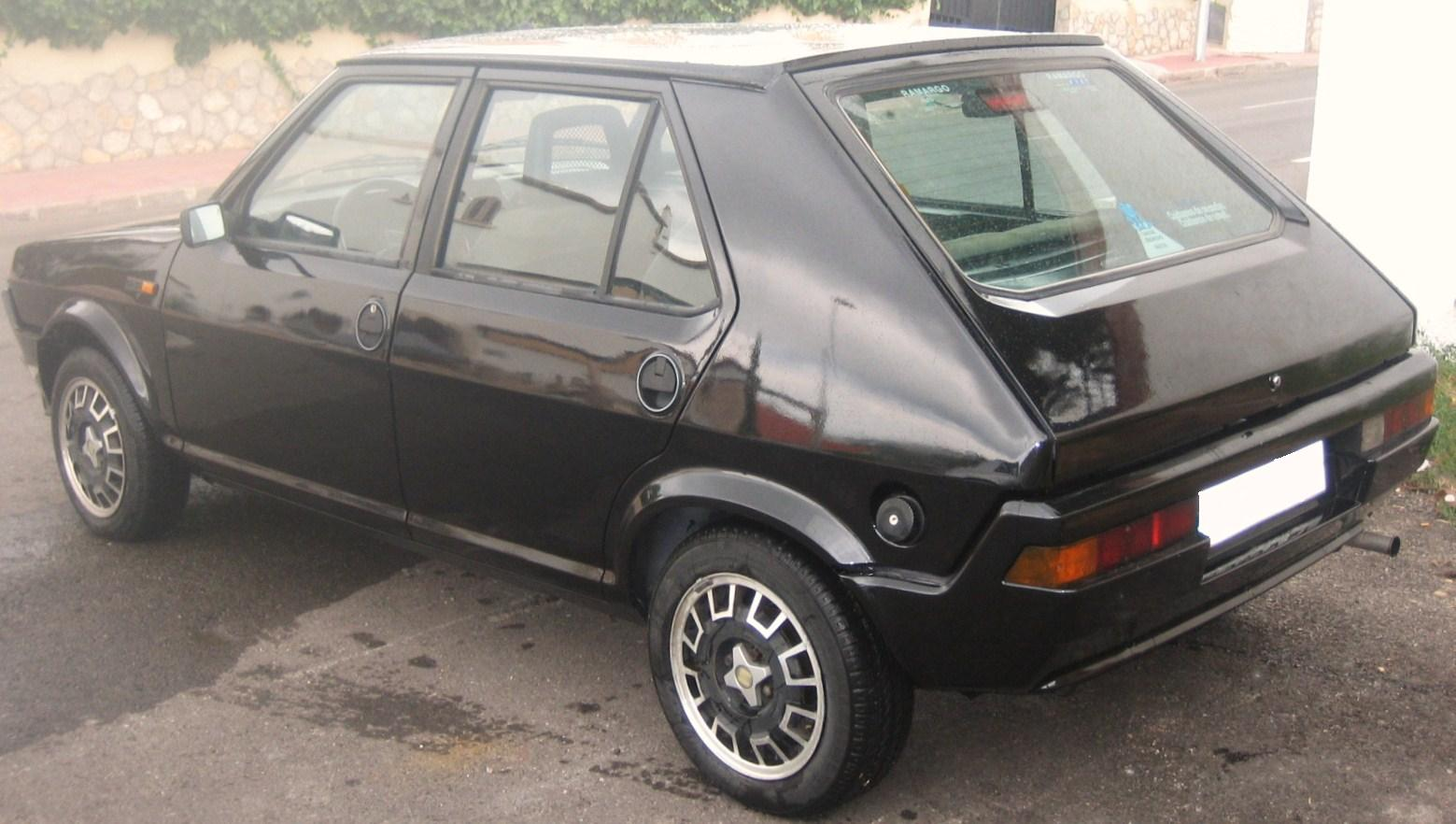
Seat Ritmo (rear view)

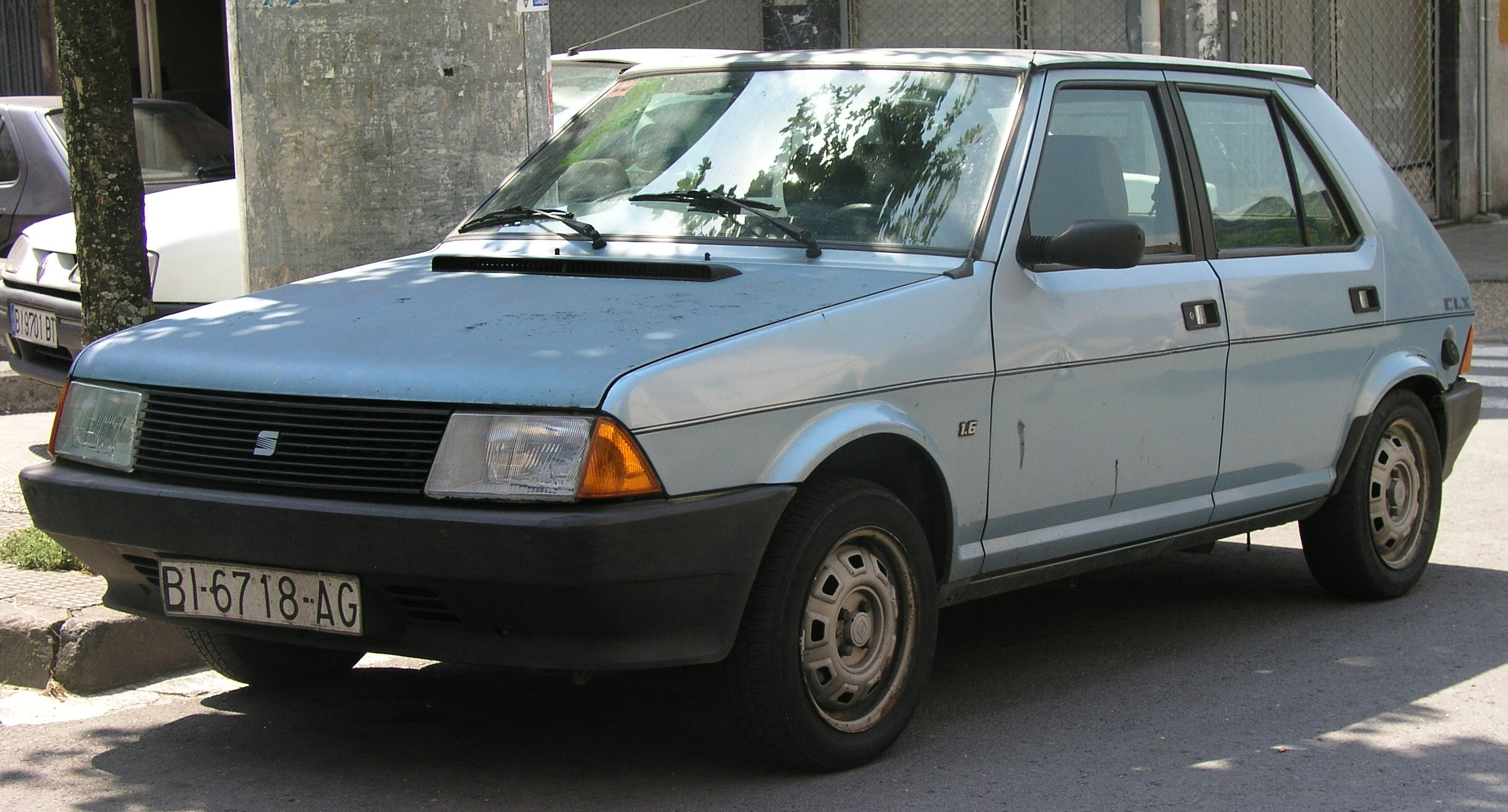
Seat Ronda 1.6 CLX

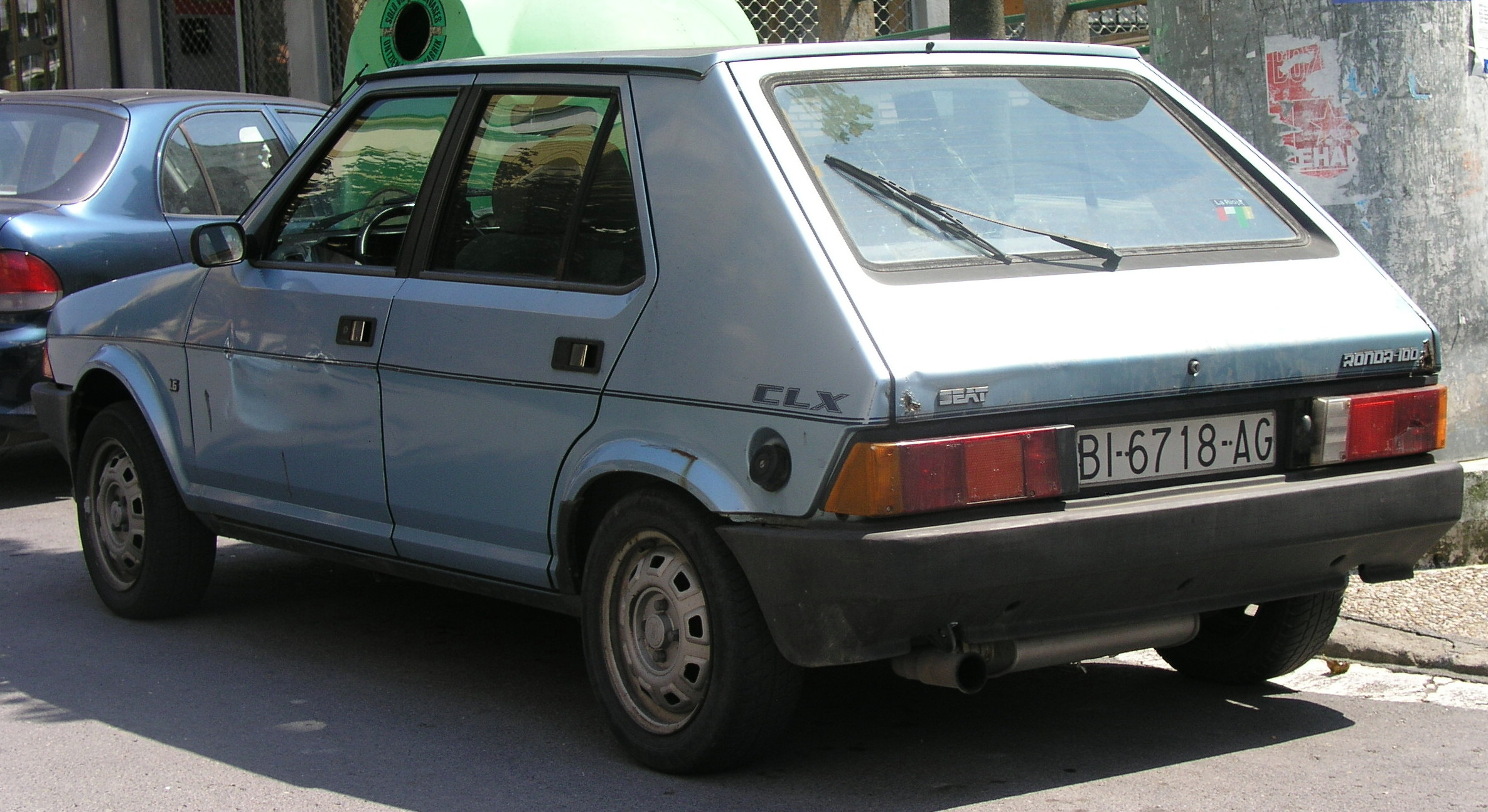
Seat Ronda (rear view)

== Revival of the Ritmo name ==
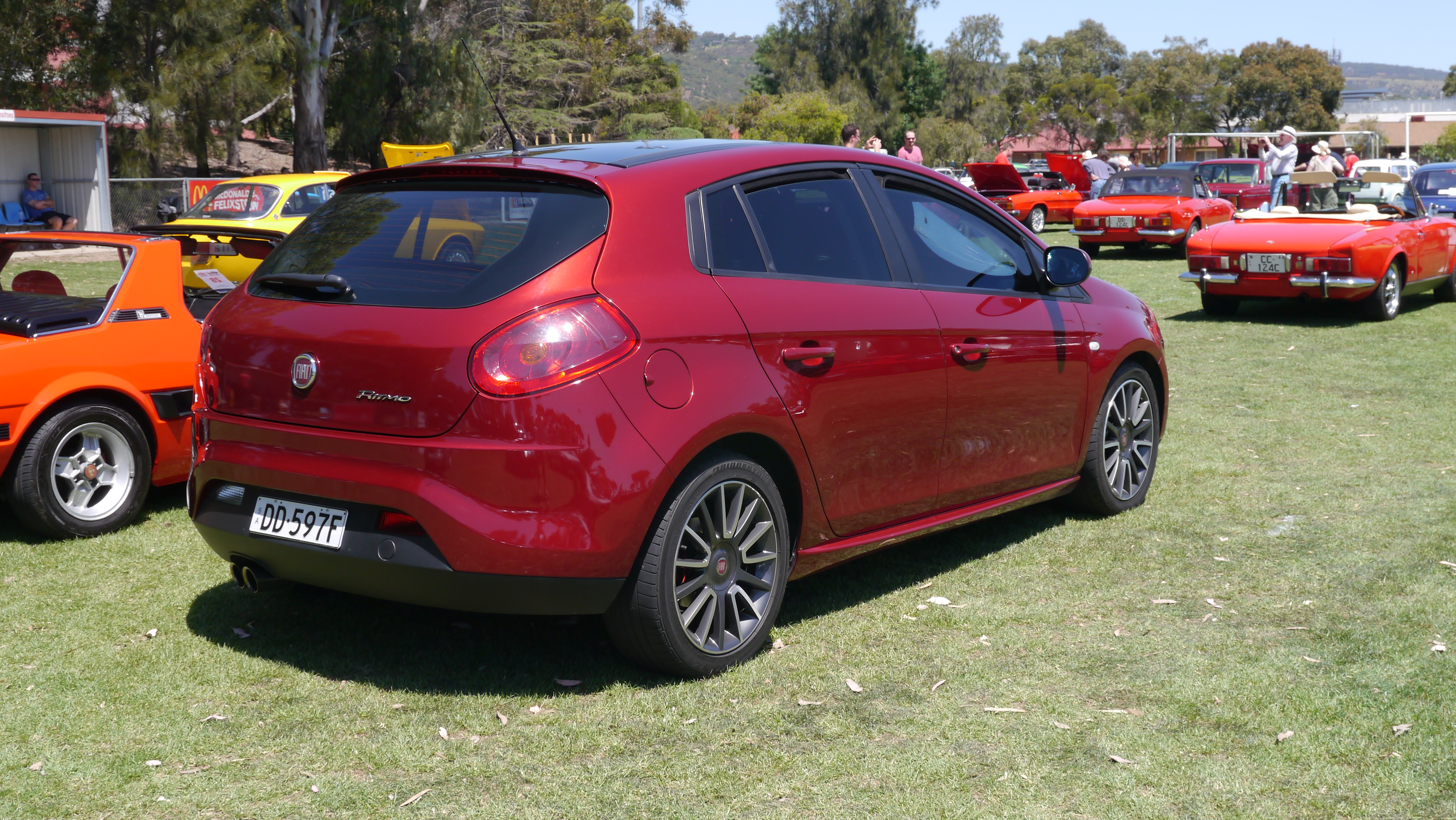
Bravo-based 2008 Fiat Ritmo

The Ritmo name was revived in Australia by the Fiat importer, Ateco, with the new Bravo sold there with Ritmo badging beginning in February 2008. This rebadging was due to the fact that, in Australia, Mazda had been using the name Bravo for its B Series pickup. Although pre-launch indication were that the Ritmo name would also be used for New Zealand, this never happened since Fiat were able to use the Bravo nameplate there. The new Ritmo sold slowly and was discontinued in 2009; the name has remained retired since.
