= Dardo (automobile) =

The Dardo was a small two-seater sports car manufactured in Brazil between 1979 and 1985.

Fiat's Brazilian endorsed its production but also offered distribution, technical assistance and a factory warranty.

With the same powertrain as the 147 Rallye, the Dardo was created by Toni Bianco for Corona S. S. Viatura e Equipamento of Diadema, São Paulo. The company was a subsidiary of Caloi – a Brazilian bicycle manufacturer.

Total production amounted to 300 cars.
