= List of automobiles notable for negative reception =

Automobiles notable for negative reception

Some models of automobiles receive high praise or negative reviews in the media and trade magazines. Reviews are both subjective and performance-based, though there are no objective, quantifiable standards. Automobiles notable for negative reception received consistently poor reviews based on many factors, including failures in the marketplace. Different sources use a variety of criteria for criticism: the worst cars for the environment, the worst crash test scores, the lowest projected reliability, the lowest projected residual value, a "not acceptable" rating after thorough testing, the lowest owner satisfaction in surveys asking whether a car performed to expectations (whether owners "would definitely buy the same car again if given the choice"), "lemon lists" of unreliable cars with bad service support, and opinionated articles or books with tongue-in-cheek descriptions by writers with a "self-proclaimed voice of reason".

Automobiles are considered notable for negative reception if they have either been referred to in popular publications as the worst of all time or have received negative reviews across multiple publications. Some of these cars were popular in the marketplace or were critically praised at launch, but have received a negative reception in retrospect; other cars are not considered intrinsically bad, but have acquired infamy because of safety or emissions defects. Conversely, some vehicles that were poorly received at launch ended up being reevaluated by collectors and became cult classics.

== 1940s ==
=== Triumph Mayflower (1949–1953) ===
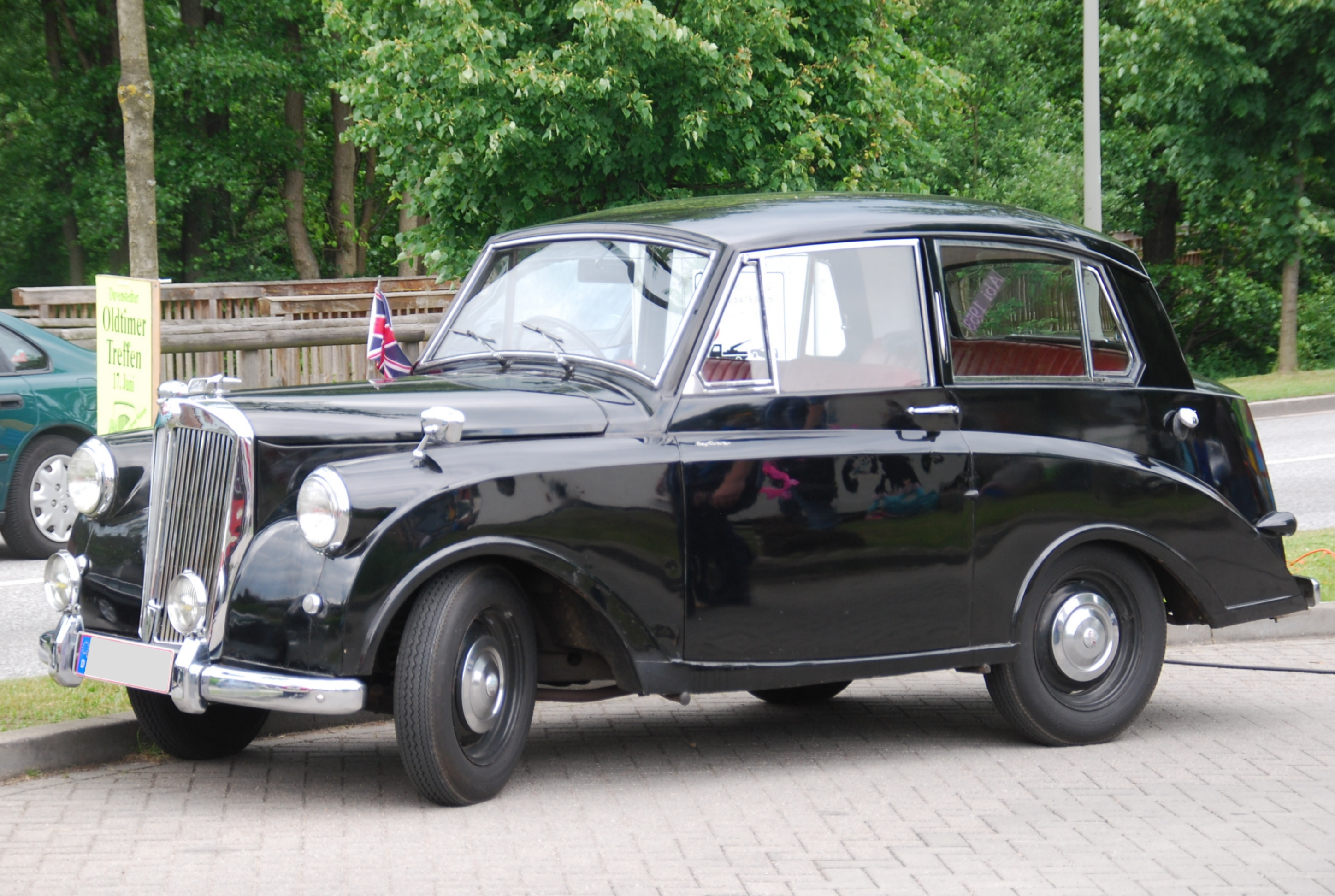
Triumph Mayflower

The Triumph Mayflower was an attempt by Triumph to manufacture a luxury small car that, as its name suggests, was intended to appeal mainly to the US market. The car shared some components with the Standard Vanguard and had a motor based on that of the Standard Ten. Its body was largely inspired by the Rolls-Royce and Bentley luxury limousines of the era, most notably the Rolls-Royce Silver Dawn; but it was much smaller, making the design and proportions look odd. The body was also heavy, which combined with the small motor made the car underpowered and slow, reaching a top speed of 63 mph (101 km/h).

James May of the BBC television show Top Gear called the Triumph Mayflower the ugliest car ever built, stating "Its details are ugly, its overall proportions are ugly, its very concept—as a car to appeal to Americans who believed they were directly descended from the Pilgrim Fathers—makes one shudder". The website Stuff included it in an article on "Cars that should never have been built", saying about it: "It always looked like the misshapen out of scale miniature of the larger, more elegant Renown model, viewed in the distorted reflection of a fairground mirror". The Triumph Mayflower was featured in the books The Worst Cars Ever Sold by Giles Chapman, Naff Motors: 101 Automotive Lemons by Tony Davis, and The World's Worst Cars by Craig Cheetham—who said that it had "the appearance of a Rolls-Royce Phantom that had been chopped in the middle".

== 1950s ==
=== Nash/Austin Metropolitan (1954–1962) ===
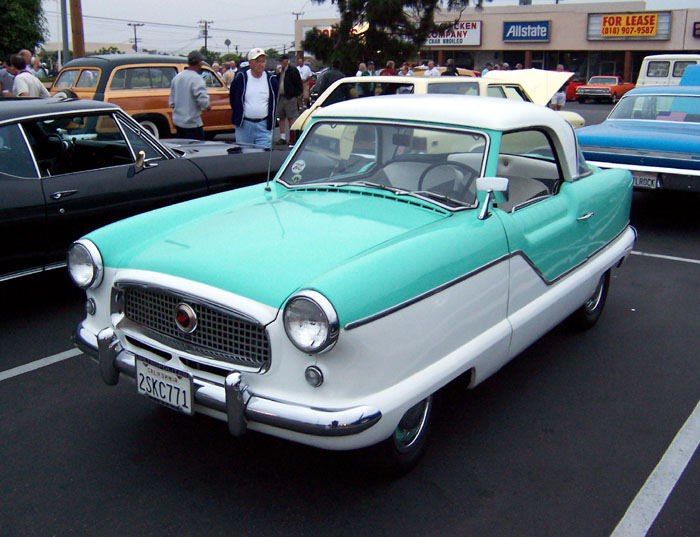
Nash Metropolitan

The Nash Metropolitan was one of the first attempts by a US car maker to produce a small car "which would be mainly used as a second car". Compared to other small cars of the era, it was intended to be more luxurious—"a big car in miniature"— by its main developer, George Mason. It was also one of the first cars specifically designed for and marketed towards women, being advertised as "a motorized shopping cart for affluent urban gals". The car was developed by Nash in cooperation with the British company Austin Motors, which also produced the car at its Longbridge plant, making it the first US-developed car to be produced entirely in a different country. However, despite large marketing efforts for the project, the car never sold as well as planned and ended up being a commercial failure. The main reasons for this failure were considered to be the car's poor performance, handling, and reliability, as well as the small market for small economy cars in the US market, with rising prosperity that—despite Nash considering it exactly the car that the United States needed—made the trend toward bigger, full-size cars.

Austin sold the Metropolitan under its own brand, and later as a standalone brand, on the European market; however, the car was not successful there either, with about 9,300 units sold. Brian Sewell of The Independent newspaper called it "one of the nastiest cars ever built". Stuff included it in its list of "Cars that should never have been built", saying: "Designed to conquer the US market by combining Nash styling with British small car mechanicals and innovation, the Metropolitan was an abject failure being the worst of both worlds." Money Inc. included it in its list of the 20 worst cars ever made, calling it "One of the biggest bombs in automotive history and definitely one of the worst cars ever made." The car has gained a cult following: it has a small, but enthusiastic fan base in North America and Europe maintaining surviving examples, and the collector's price for good cars is rising, reaching almost three times the original price.

=== Renault Dauphine (North American version) (1956–1967) ===
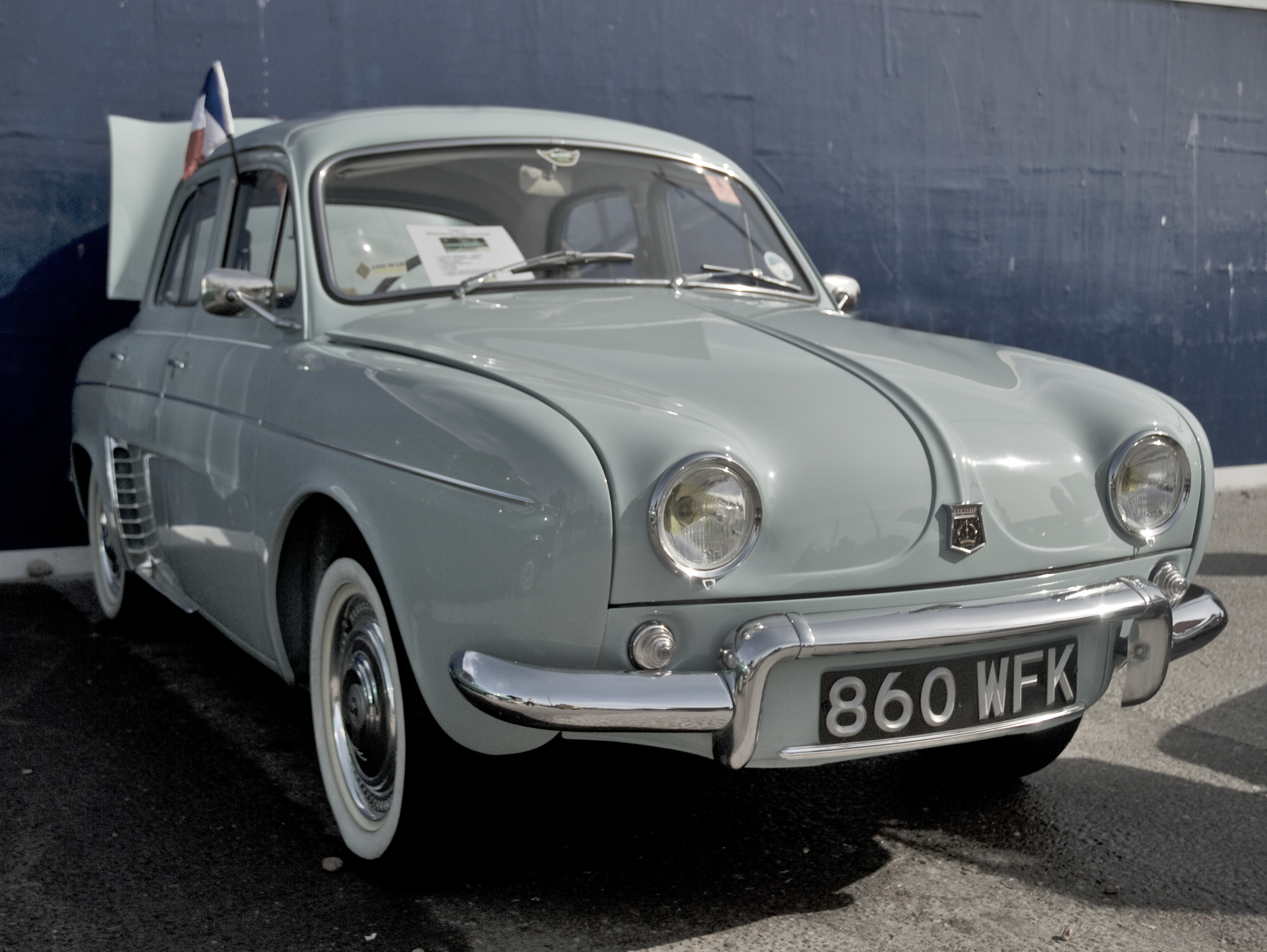
Renault Dauphine

While the Renault Dauphine was a major sales success in Europe—where it is seen as a forerunner of the modern economy car—it received a strong negative reception in the United States, largely for its poor performance and poor reliability. A period review of the Dauphine by Road & Track magazine found that the car took 32 seconds to accelerate to 60 mph (97 km/h) from a standstill. Autoblog included the Dauphine on its list of "The 20 Dumbest Cars of All Time". It was included on Time magazine's list of the "50 Worst Cars of All Time", with automotive journalist Dan Neil calling it "The most ineffective bit of French engineering since the Maginot Line", while noting that its performance "put the Dauphine at a severe disadvantage in any drag race involving farm equipment." The radio show Car Talk also placed the Dauphine ninth on its 2000 "Worst Car of the Millennium" poll, and the vehicle was named the 67th worst car of all time by the automotive resource Edmunds.

Another problem that damaged the Dauphine's reputation was rust. A 2008 retrospective article in The Independent said,

as soon as the US market had come to grips with the Dauphine's swing-axle manners and useless acceleration, they were pole-axed by its abysmal corrosion record. It would take only one New York winter of driving on salt-strewn roads to give a Dauphine front wings that resembled net curtains.

Renault apologized for the Dauphine's flaws in American print advertisements; the company marketed the car's successor, the Renault 8, as "The Renault for people who swore they wouldn't buy another one".

=== Trabant (1957–1990) ===
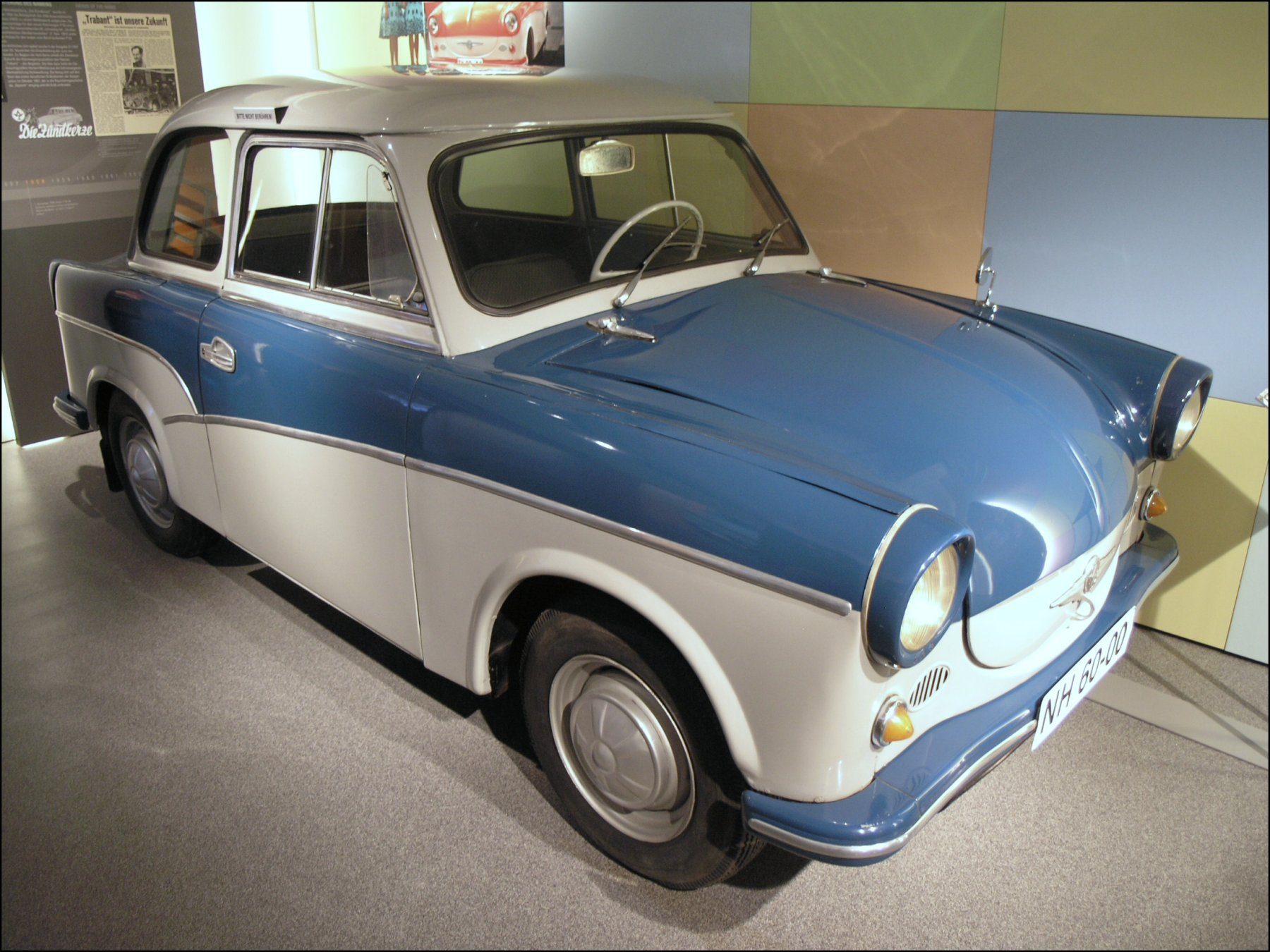
Trabant P50 Limousine

The Trabant P50 was introduced in East Germany (the German Democratic Republic; GDR) in 1957, followed shortly afterward by the updated 601 model in 1963. Because of its outdated and inefficient two-stroke engine (which caused poor fuel economy; low power output; and thick, smoky exhaust fumes), duroplast body, and production shortages, the Trabant was regarded with derisive affection as a symbol of East Germany's economic downturn and the fall of the Cold War Eastern Bloc. Many East Germans drove into West Berlin and West Germany in their Trabants after the opening of the Berlin Wall and German reunification in 1989. However, the end of the GDR also meant the end of the Trabant: it could no longer match its new, much more sophisticated West German, French, and Japanese competitors that quickly conquered the East German and Eastern European markets after Germany's reunification and the end of the Eastern Bloc. VEB Sachsenring, the manufacturer, responded with an updated Trabant, the Trabant 1.1, which was first shown in 1989 and featured a new four-stroke engine by Volkswagen; however, this offering proved to be too little, too late, to save the outdated car, and production of the new version lasted only about one year. Time named the Trabant one of the 50 worst cars of all time. It was included in Automotive Atrocities! The Cars We Love to Hate, with author Eric Peters describing its two-stroke, 18-horsepower engine as "Notorious for producing a billowing contrail of smoke, while its unsynchronized manual transmission required at least a fifth of Stolichnaya to deal with effectively."

Dan Neil said that the Trabant was the car "that gave communism a bad name" and was "a hollow lie of a car constructed of recycled worthlessness". He also noted that after East Germans drove their Trabants to freedom in West Germany, they immediately abandoned them. Edmunds ranked the Trabant as the ninth worst car of all time, claiming it is "one more reason why Communism is evil". In his book Crap Cars, Richard Porter ranked it the ninth worst car ever and said, "Before the old borders were broken down, us in the West thought we knew how harsh life was behind the Iron Curtain. Then we saw the Trabant. Oh, the humanity." The car was the butt of jokes in East Germany. After the end of the GDR, these jokes quickly spread to West Germany as well; the car also became a pop culture phenomenon when comedy films such as Go Trabi Go and Trabbi Goes to Hollywood featured Trabants as important plot devices. Despite—and partly even because of—its poor image, the Trabant has gained a strong cult following across reunified Germany, with many collector clubs maintaining surviving examples. Today, the car is considered a nostalgic symbol of the former world of the GDR that—along with other products considered typical of East Germany—regained popularity after reunification because of Ostalgie, a German term alluding to nostalgia for aspects of life in East Germany.

=== Edsel (1958) ===
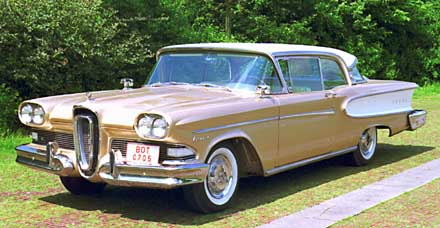
Edsel Corsair

Launched with considerable publicity, the Edsel (named after the industrialist Henry Ford's son) was the culmination of $400 million in investment and marketing by the Ford Motor Company to create a new brand of car, positioned between the entry-level Ford and the medium-priced Mercury brand, that was intended to compete against the General Motors brands Buick and Oldsmobile. Marketed as a radically different car, the Edsel failed to impress the buying public—despite containing new features such as self-adjusting brakes and automatic lubrication, which would later be adopted across the automotive industry—because it consisted primarily of Ford and Mercury components already used in other vehicles. The Edsel became such a large commercial failure that the name "Edsel" remains synonymous with "commercial failure" in American popular culture. The car was a financial disaster, generating losses estimated between $250 million and $350 million, as well as bankrupting many Ford dealers.

Time included the Edsel on its list of "The 50 Worst Cars of All Time", with Dan Neil writing that while the Edsel was not a bad car, "It was the first victim of Madison Avenue hyper-hype. Ford's marketing mavens had led the public to expect some plutonium-powered, pancake-making wondercar; what they got was a Mercury." The Los Angeles Times newspaper included it on its list of the 10 worst cars sold in the United States, calling it a "redecorated Mercury that had been beaten with an ugly stick. The legendary flop of all automotive flops." The news channel CNBC placed the Edsel on its list of the 10 ugliest cars of all time. The Edsel's unique "horsecollar" grille has been frequently ridiculed for resembling a toilet seat and later even female genitalia. Well-known sarcastic descriptions of the Edsel and its grille include that it looked like "a Mercury pushing a toilet seat" or "an Oldsmobile sucking a lemon". The tail lamps were also criticized as looking like "ingrowing toenails".

Contrary to popular belief, the controversial design of the Edsel's grille was not the primary reason for its failure. The car suffered mainly from bad marketing and bad build quality (caused chiefly by the Edsel's sharing production with Ford and Mercury models, rather than being on a dedicated assembly line). In addition, the car was released when the US was hit by a recession, and demand for medium-priced large cars decreased as US consumers started buying smaller economy cars, especially the Volkswagen Beetle. For example, Chrysler phased out its similarly positioned DeSoto brand in early 1960, around the time that Ford discontinued the Edsel marque; similar models from General Motors' Buick and Oldsmobile lines struggled to sell during this period. Edmunds ranked the 1958 Edsel as the seventh worst car of all time. However, in the book Automotive Atrocities! The Cars We Love to Hate, author Eric Peters declined to include the Edsel and defended it, saying,

People made fun of the Edsel—Ford's $400 million mistake—but its resemblance to a chrome-splattered bus station urinal aside, at least the Edsel worked. Though hideous, you could count on the mechanicals underneath the skin, which were solidly Ford and thus as good as any other car of the era.

== 1960s ==
=== Chevrolet Corvair (1960–1964) ===
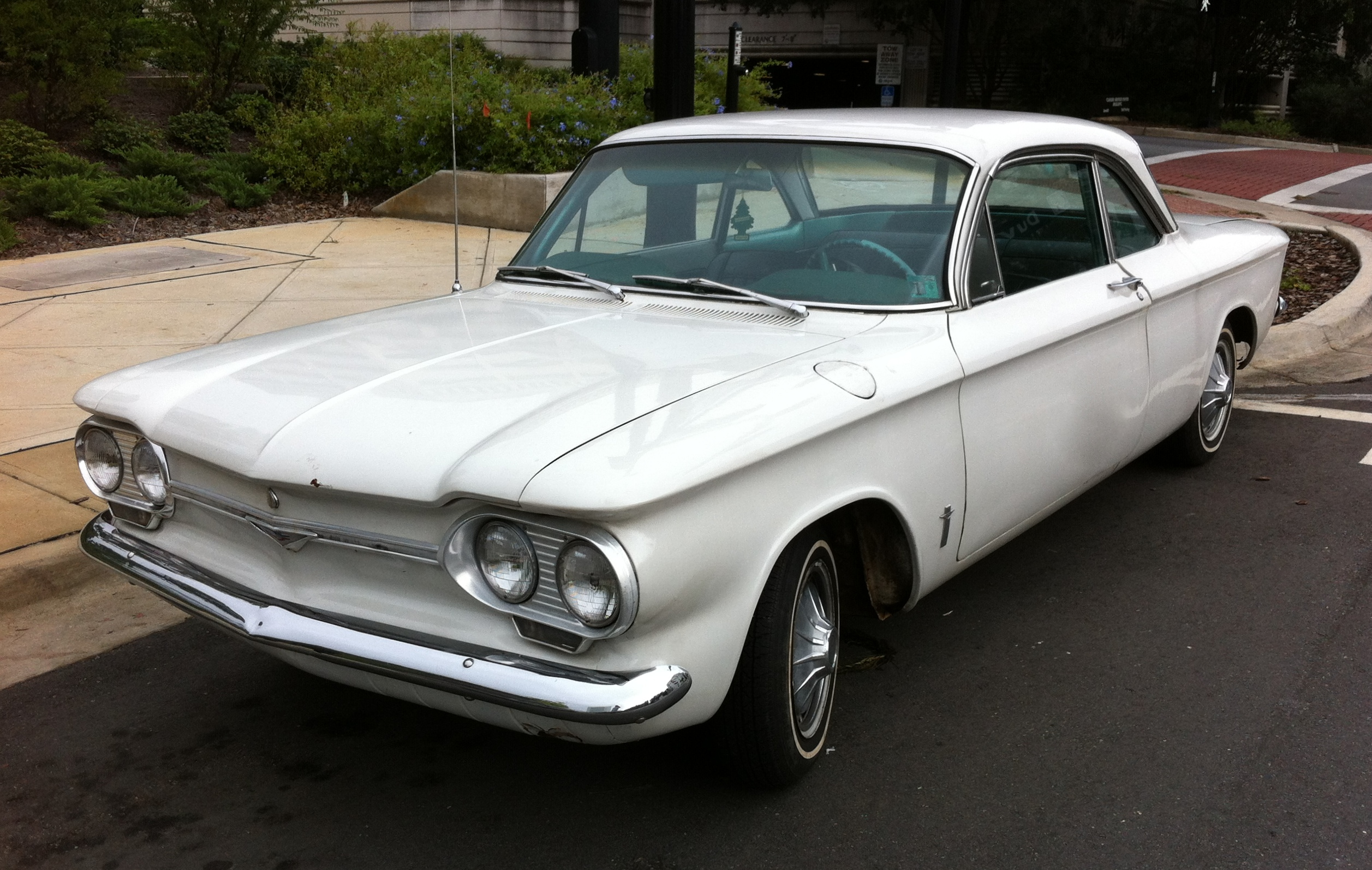
Chevrolet Corvair

While the Chevrolet Corvair was popular and critically praised upon launch, it later received scrutiny for its rear-engine layout with a swing-axle rear suspension, which caused a high number of highway accidents among drivers not used to the Corvair's unusual handling. More than 100 lawsuits were filed against General Motors in response, which resulted in consumer advocate Ralph Nader specifically scrutinizing the Corvair in his 1965 book, Unsafe at Any Speed. The negative publicity was compounded by the disclosure that GM declined to include suspension upgrades in the 1960–1963 model years that would have given the Corvair safer handling, for cost reasons. These suspension upgrades were included in the 1964 model year, before Chevrolet completely redesigned the suspension with a fully independent setup when the second generation was released in 1965. GM's attempts to discredit Nader brought additional negative publicity, around the same time that the Ford Mustang was putting significant strain on Corvair sales. The news channel CNN included the Corvair on its list of "The Ten Most Questionable Cars of All Time", and it was included on Time's "50 Worst Cars of All Time".

Former GM executive John DeLorean asserted in the book On a Clear Day You Can See General Motors (1979) that Nader's criticisms were valid. Former Ford and Chrysler President Lee Iacocca said that the Corvair was "unsafe" and a "terrible" car in his book Iacocca: An Autobiography. Dan Neil wrote, "Chevrolet execs knew the Corvair was a handful, but they declined to spend the few dollars per car to make the swing-axle rear suspension more manageable. Ohhh, they came to regret that." The controversy around the Corvair eventually led to the founding of the National Highway Traffic Safety Administration (NHTSA), as well as mandatory safety testing in the United States. Ironically, two years after production on the Corvair ended, a NHTSA report on the handling of 1960–1963 Corvairs argued that a properly maintained Corvair handled comparably to its contemporaries. Edmunds ranked the Corvair as the 62nd worst car of all time, stating that "Nader had a point." The website Curbside Classic, an offshoot of the blog The Truth About Cars, named the Corvair as one of the major "deadly sins" that led to GM's downfall:

The Corvair was the product of GM's repeated tendencies to go off in directions that were an engineer's dream, but were either flawed from the initial concept, or diminished by the bean counters. In the case of the Corvair, it was both.

=== Hillman Imp (1963–1976) ===
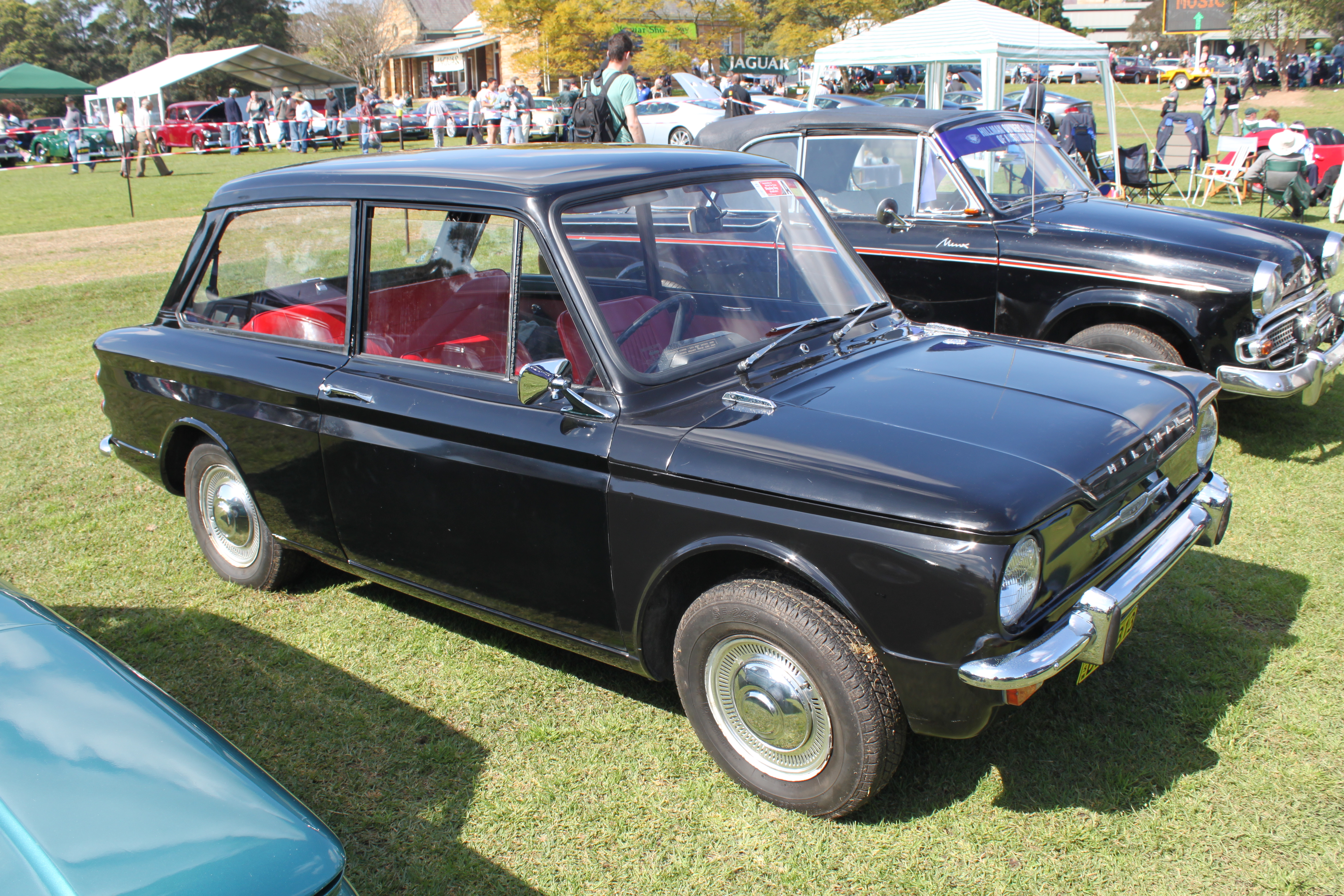
Hillman Imp

Despite being released with high hopes and receiving significant positive media attention at the time of its launch, the Hillman Imp was a commercial failure; it was largely responsible for its parent, the Rootes Group, getting into financial difficulties and being taken over by Chrysler to become part of Chrysler Europe in 1967. The Imp was designed as a small economy car that was intended to compete mainly with British Motor Corporation's (BMC's) hugely popular Mini; the Imp was initially hailed for its modern design, good road handling, and innovations—such as a motor block made entirely of aluminum and an opening rear window that, together with a folding backseat, provided decent luggage space. However, the car was criticized for having a rear-engine, rear-wheel-drive layout, while the Mini had paved the way for front-engine, front-wheel-drive small cars. However, the main problem that soon damaged the car's reputation was poor quality control at the new, purpose-built Linwood plant, as well as an underdeveloped design that was rushed into production within three years of planning. Quality issues included the frequent failure of gearboxes and water pumps, poor engine cooling that often resulted in motors overheating, and generally poor production quality and panel fit. As a result, the Imp never sold as well as the Rootes Group had expected, and it never came close to the sales of the Mini. The Imp was largely responsible for financial losses that almost bankrupted the Rootes Group, leading to a takeover by Chrysler. The Imp was featured in the books The Worst Cars Ever Sold by Giles Chapman and Naff Motors: 101 Automotive Lemons by Tony Davis.

The Imp was named among "The Five Worst English Cars of All Time" in a 2012 article on the website AskAPrice, and it was ranked as the fifth worst British car in a 2008 survey of 4,000 motorists by internet magazine iMotormag. Hotcars.com ranked it third in its list of the 20 worst European cars of all time, and the Oxford Mail newspaper included it in its "The worst car evah!" series. Nevertheless, the Imp remained in production until 1976, replaced a year later by a new hatchback model, the Chrysler Sunbeam.

=== Subaru 360 (North American version) (1968–1970) ===
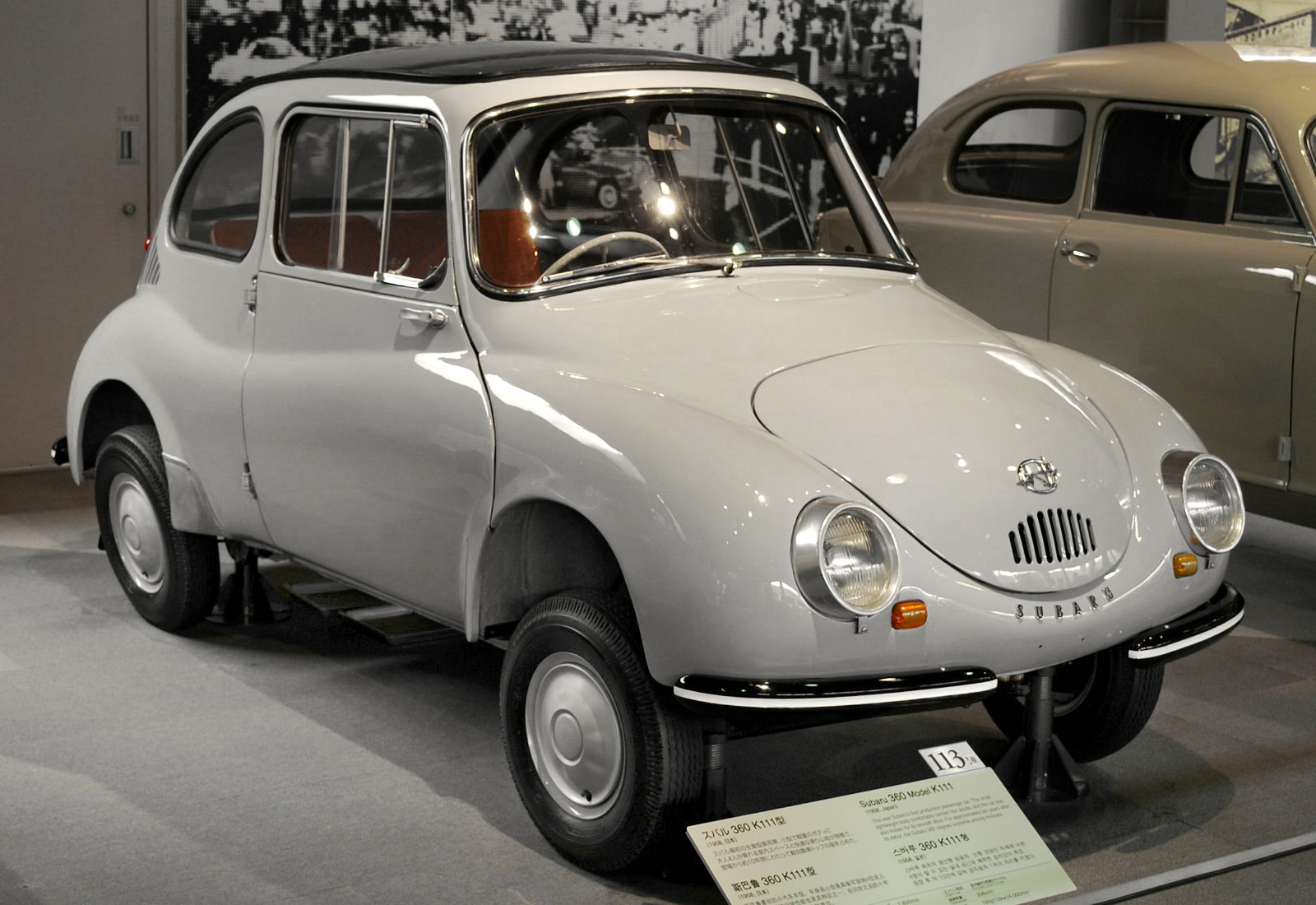
Subaru 360

The Subaru 360 was successful in its native country of Japan. In 1968, entrepreneur Malcolm Bricklin imported the car to the United States after discovering that it was inexpensive to do so because they were light enough to be exempt from US automotive safety standards. The first Subaru model sold in the US, the 360, had a manufacturer's suggested retail price (MSRP) of $1,297 and was marketed with the slogan "Cheap and ugly does it!" The 360 was a commercial failure in North America. Car and Driver magazine, in a period review, called it one of the ugliest cars in history and "the most bulbous bubble ever to putt-putt".

The 360 remains one of the worst vehicles that Consumer Reports has ever tested. The publication noted that the car took 37.5 seconds to go from 0 to 50 mph; it was dangerously structurally deficient in a 30-mph crash test with a standard car; and its bumpers were "virtually useless against anything more formidable than a watermelon"—all of which made the publication deem the 360 "unacceptably hazardous". It ended the review by saying that it "was a pleasure to squirm out of the Subaru, slam the door and walk away." Imports ceased in 1970, and 360s remained unsold in stock for years, leading Bricklin to launch a series of Go-kart race tracks using the Subarus as racing cars. Urban legends persist that unsold 360s were either crushed or pushed into the ocean. Despite the 360's failure, Subaru of America continued operations and eventually found success, selling more than 200,000 units per year by 2006.

== 1970s ==
=== VAZ-2101/Lada Riva/Zhiguli (1970–2013) ===
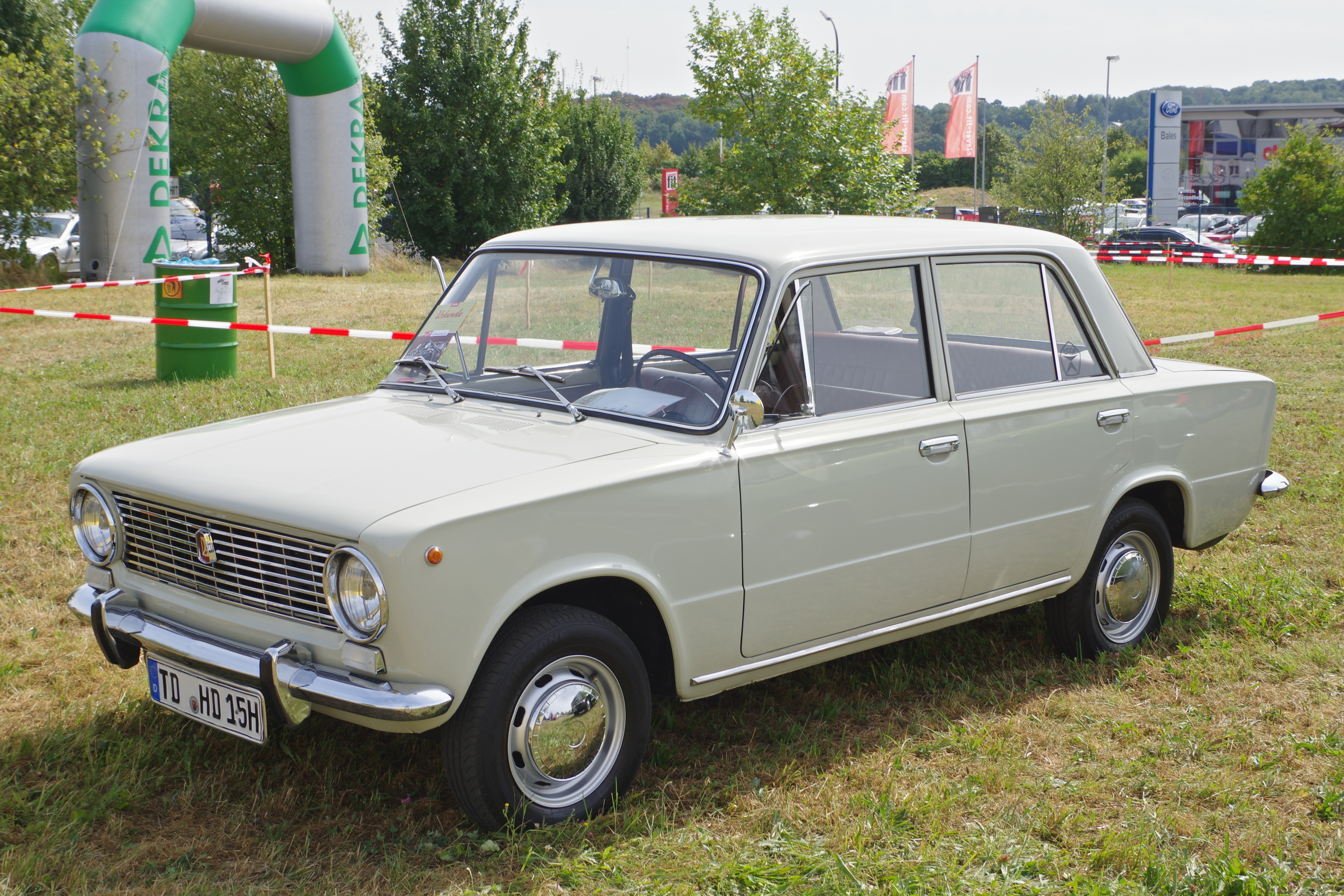
VAZ-2101

The VAZ-2101, a ruggedized version of the Fiat 124 produced in Russia, was known in export markets under various names—including Lada Nova, Lada 1200/1300, and Zhiguli—and often simply called Lada. It received a strongly negative critical reception in most Western export markets because of its old-fashioned technical layout and poor build quality. British motoring journalist Jeremy Clarkson called it "simply the worst car in the world". He said,

I don't know where the car I drove was made. Or who made it. But I suspect he was very angry about something because it was horrific. The steering column appeared to have been welded to the dashboard so that it wouldn't turn. The brakes caused the car to speed up a bit and turn left, violently, at the same time. The buttons on the dash appeared to have been put in place by Janet Ellis from Blue Peter, and the engine had plainly been lifted from a cement mixer that had spent the past 30 years chewing up rebel soldiers in southern Sudan.

Clarkson continued, "It's like a cockroach. It could survive a nuclear blast. It's amazingly tough. It can stand up to hammer blows but not water." "The engine was designed to run on Russian petrol which had an octane rating of 76. That's not really petrol. That's spicy water." Richard Porter included the car in Crap Cars. It is included in The Sunday Times' list of the 10 worst production cars of all time and The Telegraph's list of the 10 worst cars ever sold in Britain, described as "Poor to drive, uncomfortable and basic in the extreme. Virtually any car of the same age will trump this in any category."

The website Sell Your Problem Car included the VAZ-2101 in its list of "Five of the worst cars ever made", saying that it was

an all-round disaster. Its poor tank-like handling, negligible engine performance, and boxy design meant the Lada was already a thing of the past when it rolled off production in the 80s. In Russia, during the Soviet era, the Lada (or "Zhiguli" as it was called in the domestic market) was an immensely popular model, with people queuing up to get their hands on one. Over the years, however, the Lada has found itself a symbol of the decline of the Russian automobile industry.

An updated version of the original model, known as the VAZ-2105, was launched in 1980, although some markets (including the UK) did not receive it for a number of years afterward. The updated model was released as the Lada Riva in the UK and the Lada Nova in most other European markets. Despite the car's reputation, it contributed to the Lada brand selling more than 30,000 units per year in the late 1980s. The newer Samara range and the Niva 4X4 vehicle also sold well. However, their dated designs and technical layout, combined with growing competition from Asian low-cost brands such as Hyundai and Proton, made Lada's market share decline from the early 1990s. Faced with the difficulty of its models satisfying European Union (EU) emissions requirements, Lada withdrew from the UK and most other Western European markets in 1997. The Lada is the third-best-selling car of all time after the Ford Model T and the Volkswagen Beetle. The Lada's production run of 43 years also makes it one of the longest-produced cars ever. It has developed a strong cult following, is a recognizable cultural icon of Russia and the Soviet Union, and is still commonly seen in both Russia and former Soviet states.

=== AMC Gremlin (1970–1978) ===
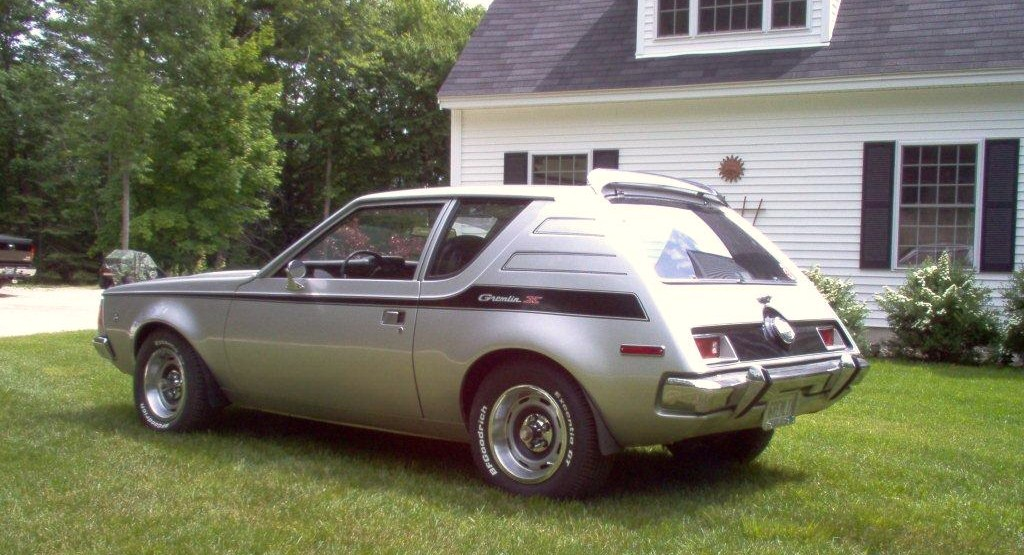
AMC Gremlin X

The 1970 AMC Gremlin, a shortened version of the AMC Hornet, was introduced in 1970 to compete in the emerging American market for subcompact cars. However, the Gremlin's odd styling and out-of-date technology earned it lasting derision. Named by Time as one of the 50 worst cars of all time, Dan Neil wrote:

Dick Teague's design team basically whacked off the rear of the AMC Hornet with a cleaver. The result was one of the most curiously proportioned cars ever. Cheap and incredibly deprived — with vacuum-operated windshield wipers, no less — the Gremlin was also awful to drive, with a heavy six-cylinder motor and choppy, unhappy handling due to the loss of suspension travel in the back. The Gremlin was quicker than other subcompacts but, alas, that only meant you heard the jeers and laughter that much sooner.

Including the Gremlin on its list of "The Ten Most Questionable Cars of All Time", CNN said,

Like other AMC cars (see the Pacer) the Gremlin can be seen as either a daring leap forward by an innovative underdog or as a desperate attempt to do something—anything—that would stand out in a marketplace dominated by larger competitors.

The Gremlin also placed fourth on Car Talk's "Worst Car of the Millennium" poll. CNBC included it on its list of the 10 ugliest cars of all time. In his book Automotive Atrocities!: The Cars We Love to Hate, author Eric Peters wrote that the Gremlin had a "distinctive 'What happened to the rest of your car, buddy?' look that became the Gremlin's signature design feature." He also said that the 1970 Gremlin's lack of disc brakes, radial tires, and electric windshield wipers "hearkened back to the technologically sophisticated days of 1935." Edmunds ranked the Gremlin as the 19th worst car of all time, saying, "it runs second only to its brother the Pacer in Loserland."

=== Chevrolet Vega (1971–1977) ===
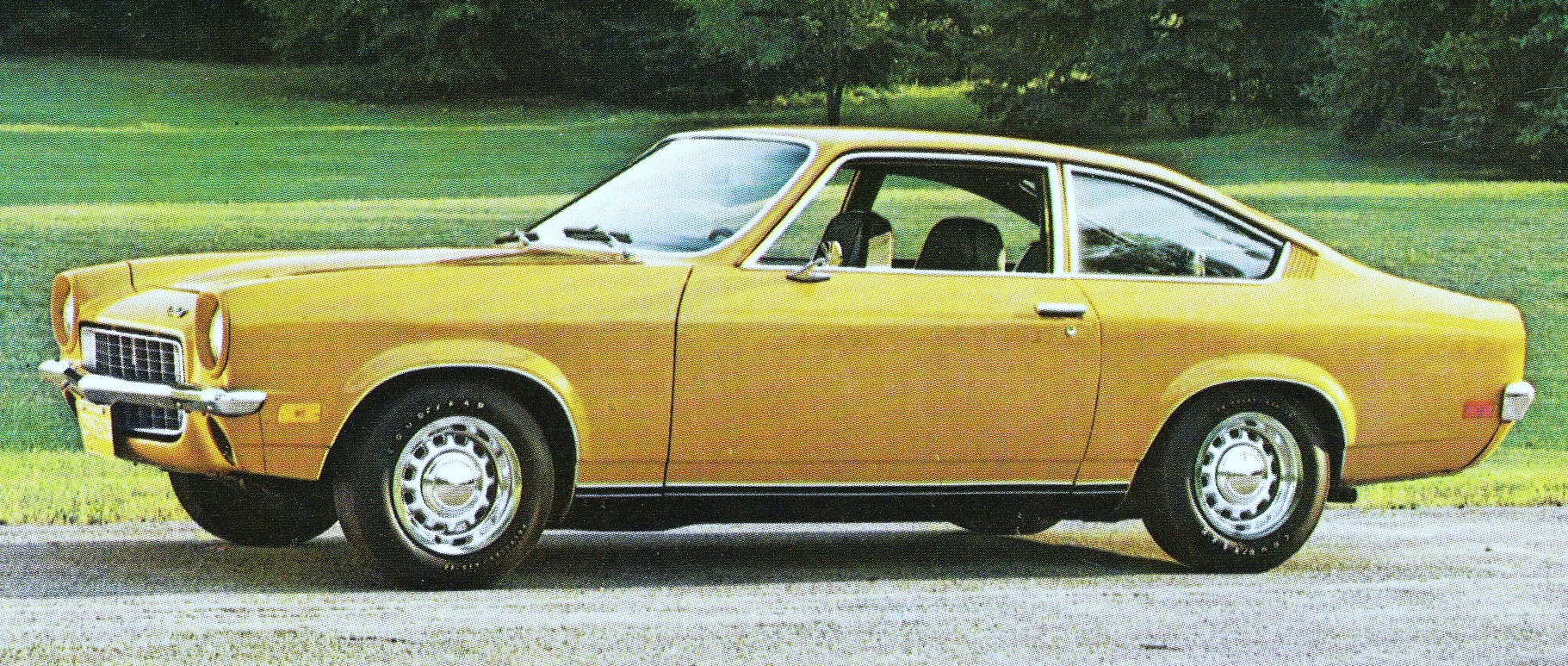
Chevrolet Vega Coupe

The Chevrolet Vega earned critical acclaim upon launch. The car was named the Motor Trend Car of the Year for 1971 and became a best seller. However, severe quality and reliability issues permanently damaged its reputation. The car's aluminum block engine and new method of rustproofing were initially praised as innovative, but the Vega proved extremely vulnerable to corrosion and premature engine failure. By the late 1970s, Vegas were being scrapped at such a high rate that many junkyards refused to purchase them. Autoblog included the Vega on its list of "The 20 Dumbest Cars of All Time", saying that it "proved the point that American car makers did not make good small cars." It placed second on Car Talk's poll of "The Worst Car of the Millennium", and it was named on Forbes' 2004 list of "The Worst Cars of All Time". Car and Driver named it one of the 10 most embarrassing award-winning cars, stating, "The Chevy Vega is on everyone's short list for Worst Car of All Time. It seemed the only time anyone saw a Vega on the road not puking out oily smoke was when it was being towed."

Popular Mechanics magazine included the Vega on its list of "10 Cars That Damaged GM's Reputation"; the magazine later commemorated the 40th anniversary of the car's launch, marking the Vega as the catalyst that put General Motors on the downward spiral that culminated in its bankruptcy in 2009. This 2010 retrospective also noted the Vega's high sales numbers in relation to its poor quality, saying,

Since the Vega sold so strongly (almost 2 million were built before it left production after 1977), the result was that literally hundreds of thousands of buyers were having awful experiences with the car. Surely, those customers were then far more willing to consider the Japanese alternatives that were starting to arrive.

The Truth About Cars named the Vega as one of the "deadly sins" that led to GM's downfall: "The Vega was GM's Watergate/Waterloo, the beginning of the inevitable end." Edmunds ranked the Vega as the fifth worst car of all time. In his 1979 book On a Clear Day You Can See General Motors, former GM executive John DeLorean devoted a full chapter to the Vega, describing how poorly it performed in durability testing and noting that GM knew about its quality problems before launch.

=== Ford Pinto (1971–1980) ===
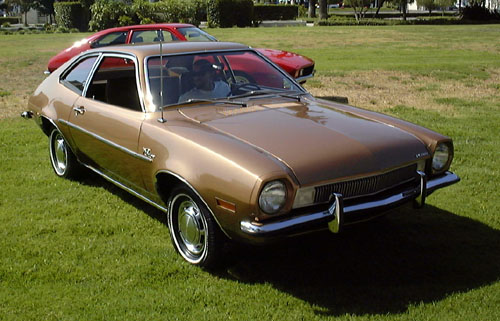
Ford Pinto

While the Ford Pinto was a strong seller that was received decently well, its reputation was permanently marred by the accusation that the car could catch fire when rear-ended because of a defective fuel tank design. The infamous "Pinto memo"—a document submitted to the NHTSA examining the societal costs of new rollover legislation—was presented to the public as proof that Ford executives had known about a design defect and decided to take no action after calculating that the cost of lawsuits was lower than the cost of reengineering the car. This presentation caused public outrage.

Including the Pinto on Time's list of the 50 worst cars of all time, Dan Neil wrote,

They shoot horses, don't they? Well, this is fish in a barrel. Of course the Pinto goes on the Worst list, but not because it was a particularly bad car—not particularly—but because it had a rather volatile nature. The car tended to erupt in flame in rear-end collisions.

CNN named the Pinto one of the "Most Questionable Cars of All Time", saying, "Images of flaming Pintos are so seared into the public consciousness that it's probably hard for most people, unaided by a photograph, to conjure a mental image of the car while not on fire." Autoblog ranked the Pinto first on its list of "The 20 Dumbest Cars of All Time". The Pinto placed third in Car Talk's 2000 "Worst Car of the Millennium" survey, and it was ranked the 16th worst car of all time by Edmunds.

=== Morris Marina (1971–1980) ===
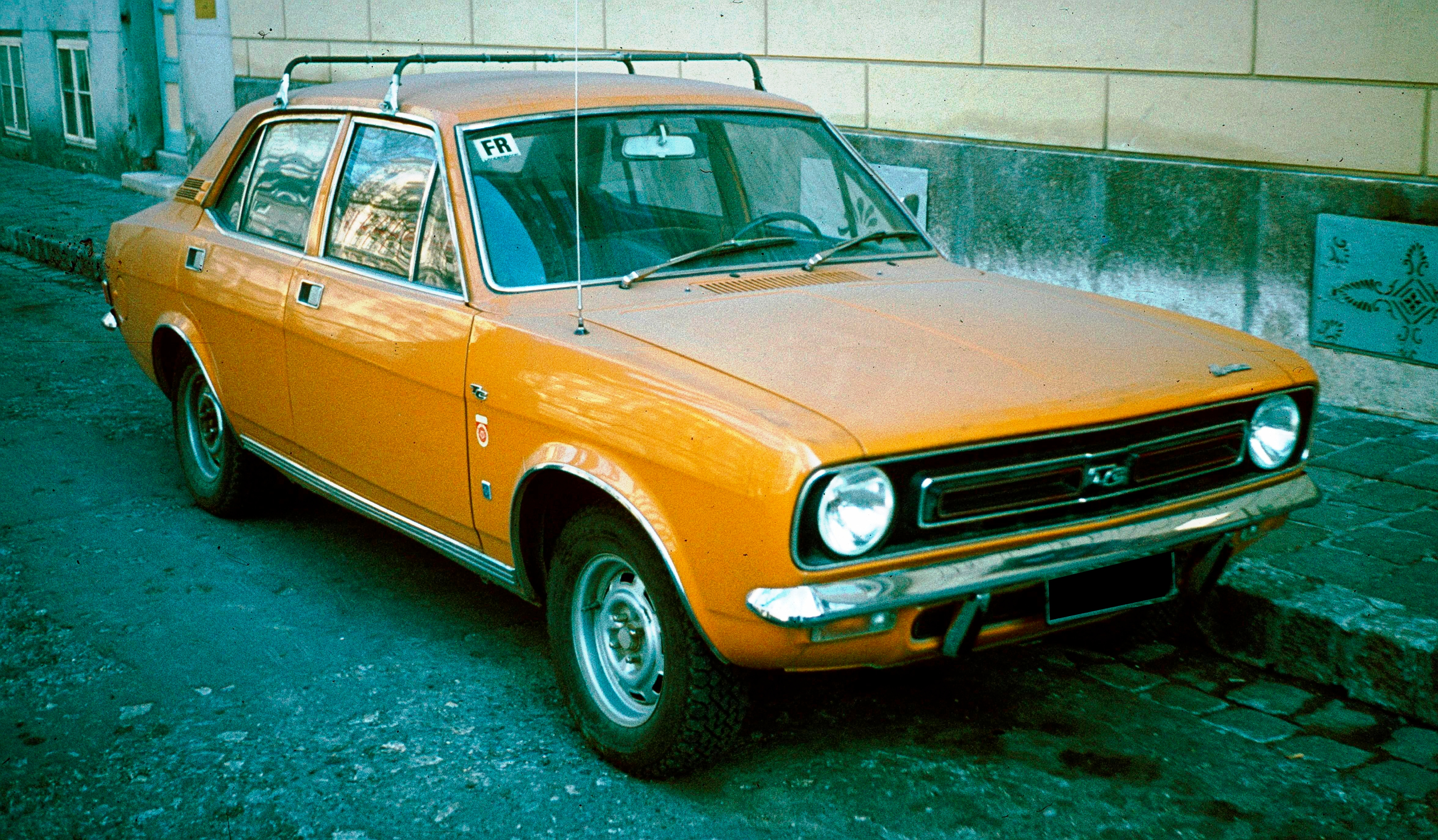
Morris Marina

Since its release, the Morris Marina has been criticized for its poor performance, styling, handling, and build quality. Launched in April 1971 by British Leyland (BL), the car reused existing mechanical parts; these included a front suspension from the 1948 Morris Minor, ex-BMC engines first launched in the early 1950s, and a gearbox and axle sourced from Triumph and introduced in 1962. The Marina was designed and developed with a limited budget and a short time scale—less than three years from initial conception to full production—to urgently replace a number of outdated saloon car models inherited by British Leyland from BMC. The car was intended to be in production for five years before a better-considered car could replace it. The Marina was designed as a direct response to the highly successful MkII Ford Cortina. In October 1970, the month that the Marina was officially announced, Ford released the larger, more upmarket, and more sophisticated MkIII Cortina, which immediately made the Morris seem dated. Early cars had a design flaw in their front suspension, which led to dangerous handling. While this flaw was corrected before full-scale sales began, the Marina was still criticized for its poor handling, road holding, and refinement. The Daily Telegraph newspaper included the Marina on its list of "10 Cars That Should Have Never Been Produced".

On the television series Clarkson's Car Years, originally broadcast in 2000, Jeremy Clarkson compared the Marina to the Austin Allegro in order to determine which car was worse; he blew up a Marina in an automotive game of bar skittles on one of his DVDs. Clarkson has said the Marina "cost 40 million pounds to develop, which since it was meant to be hopeless, was too much", and that its rear suspension "dates back to a medieval hand cart". Destroying Marinas has become a running gag on Top Gear, which has drawn the anger of Marina enthusiasts and resulted in complaints being made to the BBC. In addressing these complaints, Top Gear presenter James May has stated that at least one Marina needs to be preserved in a museum as "a warning from history". The website CarThrottle ranked it first on its list of "10 Of The Worst Cars Ever Made In The UK". Despite its poor reputation, the Marina was one of Britain's best-selling cars throughout its production life, peaking at second place in sales charts in 1973 (behind the Cortina) and remaining at third or fourth place throughout the 1970s. More than 1.2 million Marinas were built in total, making it British Leyland's second-best-selling car after the Mini. The Marina was restyled in 1980 to become the Morris Ital, a stopgap replacement for the Marina until the all-new Austin Montego was launched in 1984.

=== Vauxhall HC Viva "Firenza" (Canada) (1971–1973) ===
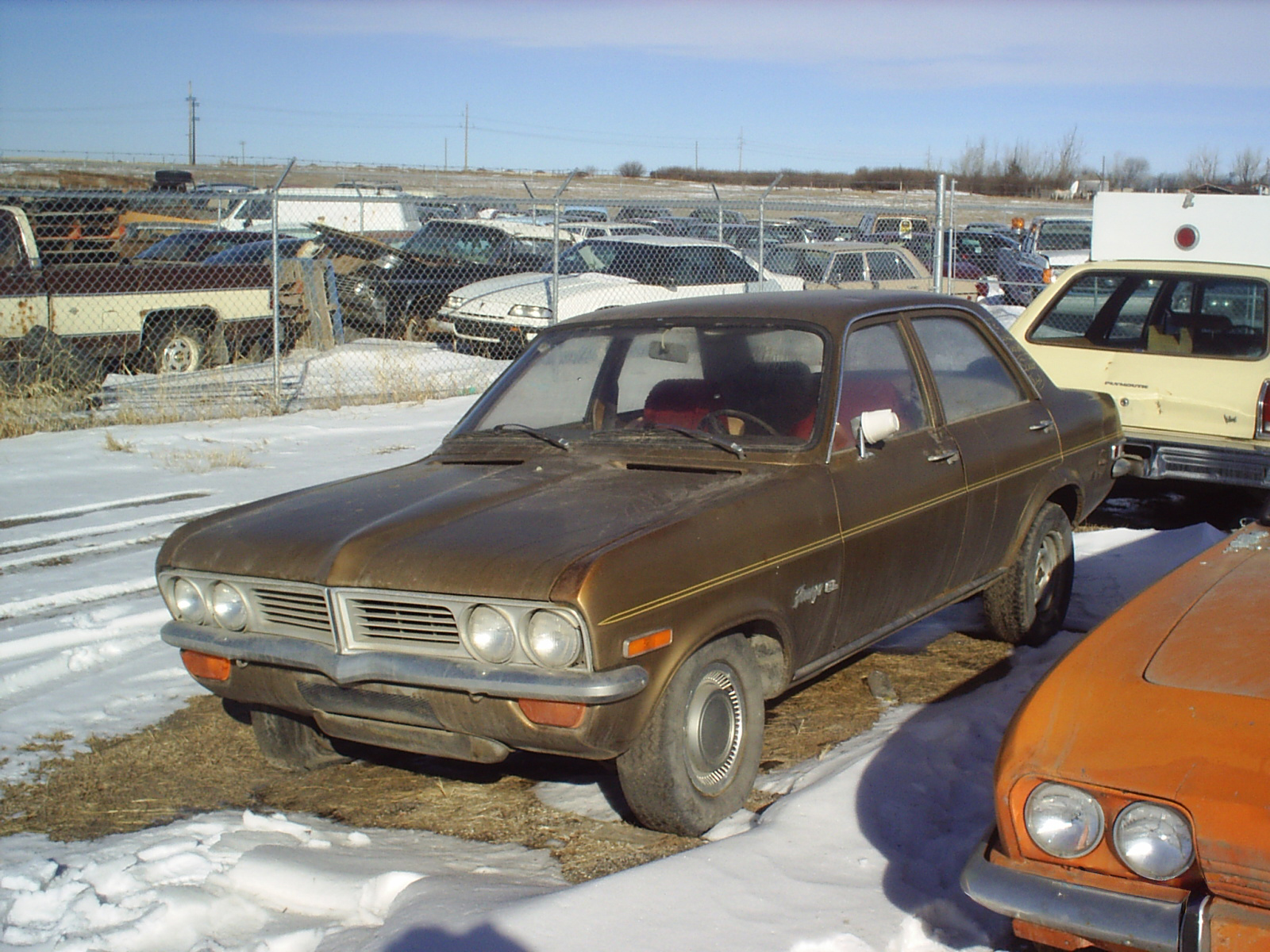
Vauxhall Viva Firenza, Canadian model

During the 1960s, General Motors Canada began importing compact Vauxhall models from the United Kingdom to compete with popular imported compacts such as the Volkswagen Beetle and the Toyota Corolla. The Vauxhall HC Viva was renamed the "Firenza" in the Canadian market in response to the previous generation's quality problems and to hide its British origins. The Firenza was plagued with quality problems, compounded by a lack of spare parts due to the frequent UK labor strikes at the time. Common Firenza problems included brake failure and engine fires. In 1972, angry Firenza owners formed the "Dissatisfied Firenza Owners Association"; they engaged in public demonstrations to publicize the car's quality problems and to demand compensation from General Motors for repair costs and depreciation. The car had become so toxic on the used car market that one-year-old models with low mileage were worth less than a quarter of their MSRP, and dealerships refused to accept them as trade-ins. Two Firenzas caught fire during a 32-car protest outside of the Canadian House of Commons.

These protests, combined with reports of a 19-year-old woman dying in an accident caused by her Firenza's steering failing, prompted intervention by the Canadian government. GM denied the problems and attempted to protect the Firenza's reputation through deceptive marketing, before withdrawing the car from the Canadian market in early 1973. The Disaffected Firenza Owners Association attempted to sue General Motors, but Canada lacked laws establishing class-action lawsuits at the time, prompting Prime Minister Pierre Trudeau to oversee their creation. The failure of the Firenza hurt Vauxhall, which considered Canada an important export market. Curbside Classic argued that the Firenza debacle, combined with the HC Viva's poor reception in the rest of the world, is responsible for Vauxhall no longer being an autonomous company. The Firenza was the last vehicle that Vauxhall developed in-house before selling a line-up of slightly modified Opels. In a 2018 retrospective, the website Autofocus.ca described the Firenza as "the worst car Canada ever saw"; the website claimed that the car's obscurity outside of Canada was the only thing preventing it from being considered one of the all-time worst cars alongside the likes of the Gremlin and the Pinto, while describing it as Canada's equivalent of Ralph Nader and the Chevrolet Corvair.

=== Lancia Beta (1972–1984) ===
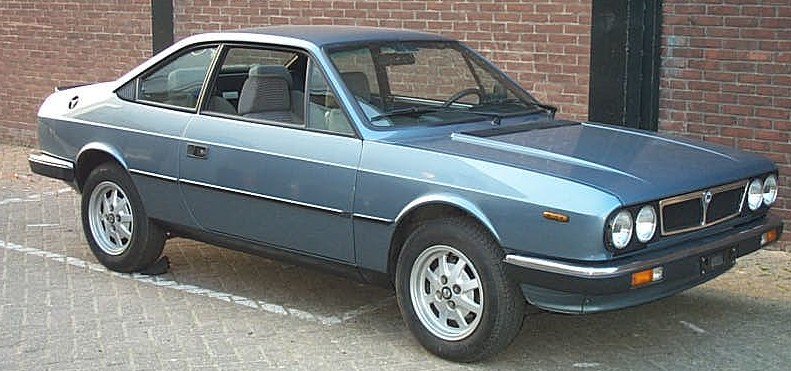
Lancia Beta

While the Lancia Beta was widely praised upon launch by the motoring press and general public, the car soon gained a reputation for being extremely rust-prone, especially with early models. At the time, it was widely rumored that this rust was due to the vehicles being constructed from Soviet steel; this was allegedly supplied to Lancia's parent company, Fiat, in exchange for building the main Lada factory. These claims were never verified; it has been suggested that these issues were more likely the result of poor rustproofing techniques, as well as the prolonged factory strikes that plagued Italy at the time. Regardless of the actual cause, these corrosion problems eventually became such an issue that many of the cars had to be recalled. Along with the failure of the company's larger Gamma model, the negative publicity that the Beta's corrosion generated permanently damaged Lancia's reputation. The company saw a decline in sales in the United Kingdom, its largest export market at the time, which was never reversed, and it led Lancia to withdraw from right-hand drive markets in 1994.

=== Reliant Robin/Rialto (1973–2002) ===
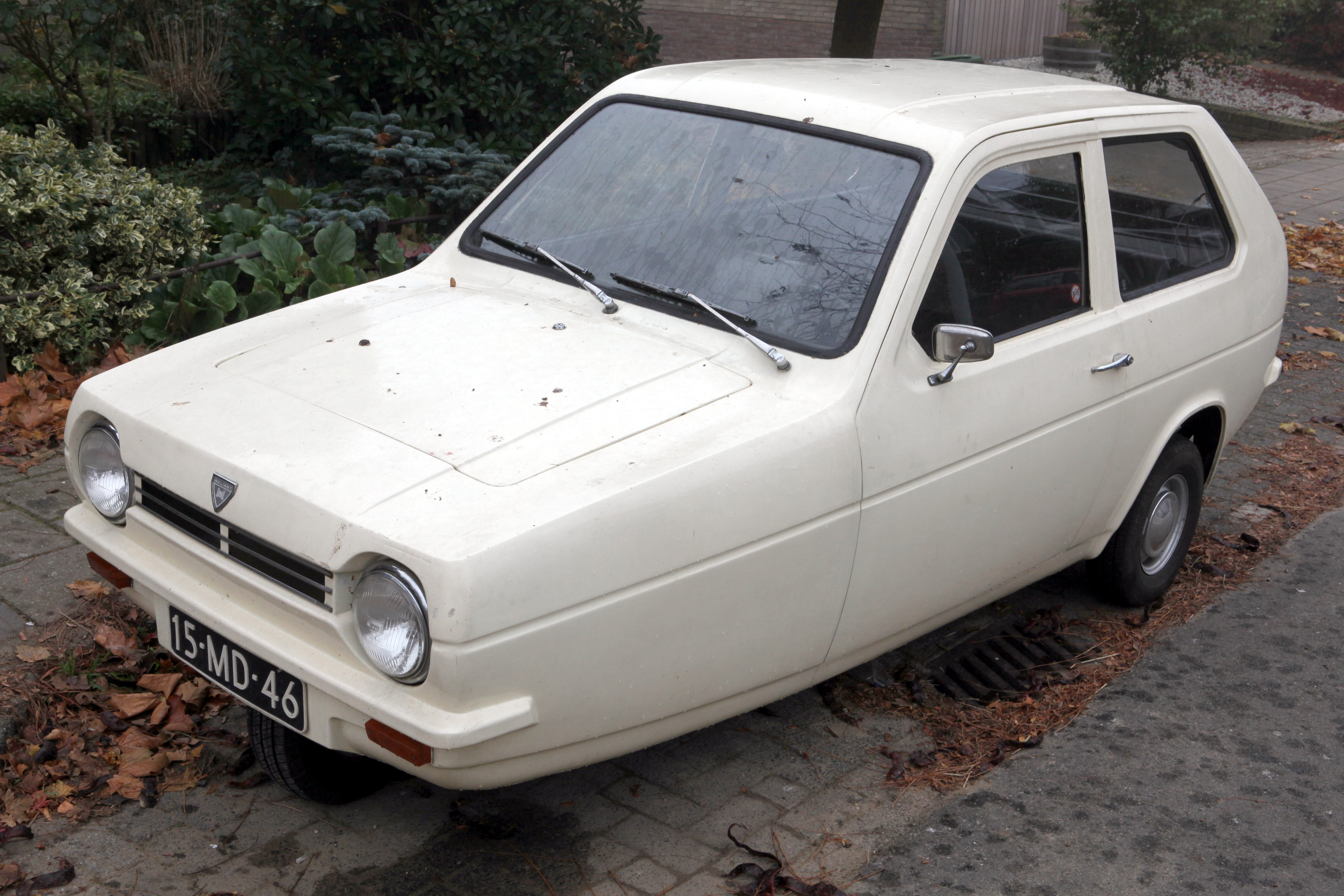
Reliant Robin

The Reliant Robin is a three-wheeled small car. It is perhaps the best-known and most infamous product of the British three-wheeled car industry, which was successful from the 1950s until the 1980s—mainly because of British tax loopholes that allowed three-wheeled cars to be taxed as motorcycles and driven with a motorcycle license. The Robin enjoyed sales success throughout its lifetime and has a special place in British culture. The car's name was so popular that its 1982 successor, the Reliant Rialto, was renamed Robin in 1989, thereby making the Robin name persist for another 13 years, as well as making the car see the new millennium until production ended in 2002. Despite its success, the car has also become the butt of many jokes because of its three-wheeled design; fiberglass body shell; and primitive, old-fashioned technique; it is often cited among the worst cars ever made. The car is sometimes nicknamed the "Plastic Pig" because of its distinctive shape and fiberglass body shell. In addition, the car was part of a well-known episode of Top Gear (series 15, episode 1), in which Jeremy Clarkson drives a Reliant Robin and makes it roll over multiple times. He said that driving it was as dangerous as "inviting your mum 'round for an evening on Chatroulette", and that the Robin "wasn't funny, it was a complete menace." The following two episodes featured racing drivers The Stig and Ken Block in Robins on their test track, and neither driver could finish a clean lap in the specially doctored Robins. Later, Clarkson admitted that the Robin used on the show had a modified differential that allowed it to roll over easily. He also admitted that he "actually likes" the Robin.

The Robin was featured in the books The Worst Cars Ever Sold by Giles Chapman and Crap Cars by Richard Porter. It was voted the eighth worst car ever in an Auto Express magazine poll, with the article saying, "The butt of countless jokes, the Reliant Robin was missing more than a wheel and will be remember [sic] as one of the worst cars ever". In a 2013 poll, it was voted the worst British car of all time. Edmunds ranked it the 13th worst car of all time, stating, "Ludicrously unstable three-wheeler that turns turtle on its plastic body at the slightest provocation. Fortunately, with a 750cc engine, it was underpowered, too." CarThrottle ranked it second on its list of "10 Of The Worst Cars Ever Made In The UK".

=== Austin Allegro (1973–1982) ===
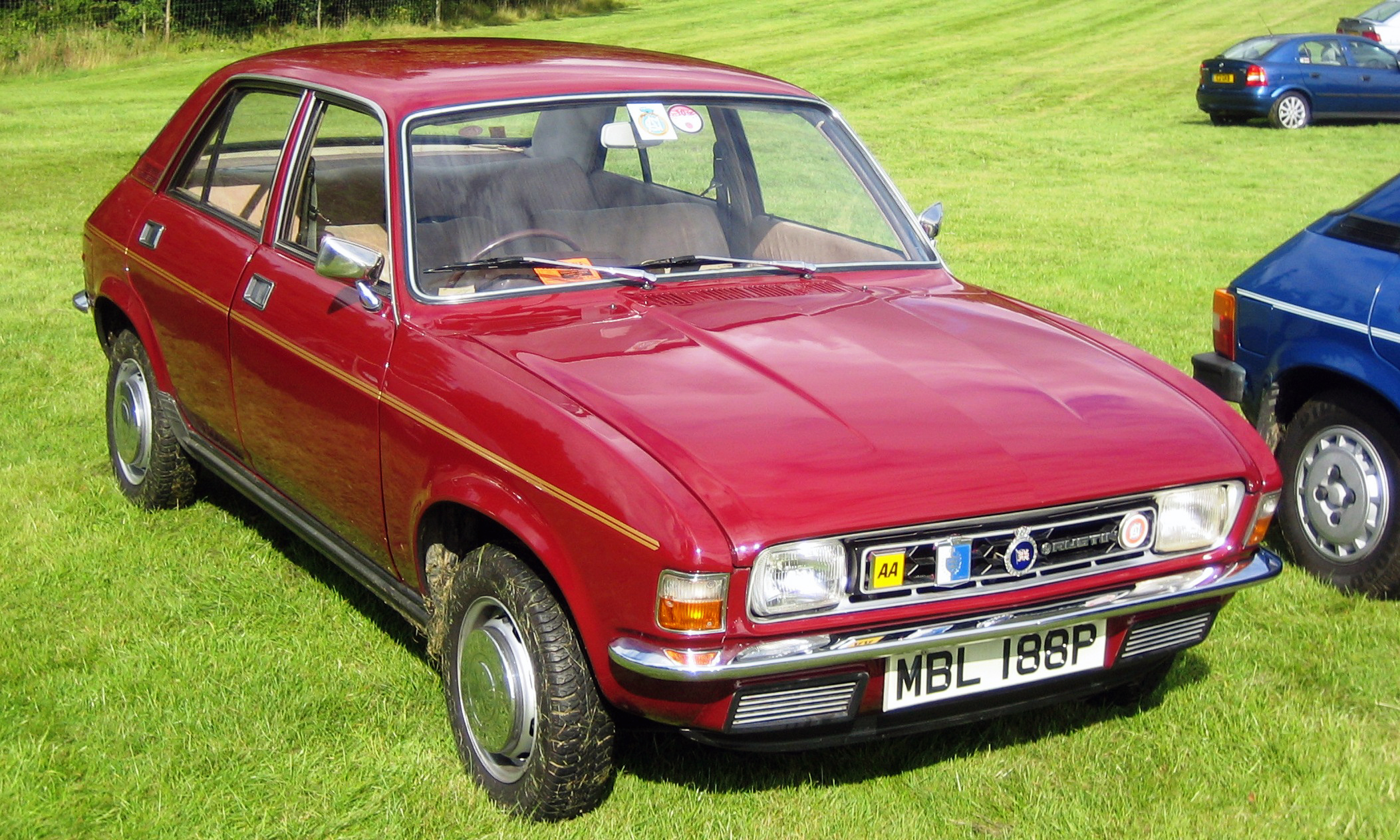
Austin Allegro

The Austin Allegro was launched in 1973, intended as a radical clean-sheet design by British Leyland. However, the car has been strongly criticized for its poor quality and odd styling. In Crap Cars, Richard Porter writes that "the only bit of the Allegro they got even vaguely right was the rust-proofing". The Allegro was ranked second worst on his list, beaten only by the Volkswagen Beetle. The poor reputation of the car—as well as the inefficient production and management techniques in British Leyland at the time—has meant that the Austin Allegro has become associated with waste, inefficiency, and poor quality.

On Clarkson's Car Years, Jeremy Clarkson compared the Austin Allegro to the Morris Marina. He concluded that the Allegro was a better (less bad) car than the Marina, because it was a horrible car in a more original way than the Marina. Clarkson further said of the Allegro that it was "hideously ugly"; that whoever proposed its square steering wheel should have had pens thrown at him; and that "it was more aerodynamic going backwards." In 2007, when criticizing the inefficiencies of the UK Learning and Skills Council, Digby Jones said, "It is what I call 'the British Leyland model' – you put a lot of money in at the top, and an Austin Allegro comes out at the bottom". Edmunds ranked the Allegro as the 81st worst car of all time and expressed gratitude that it was never exported to the United States.

=== Leyland P76 (1973–1975) ===
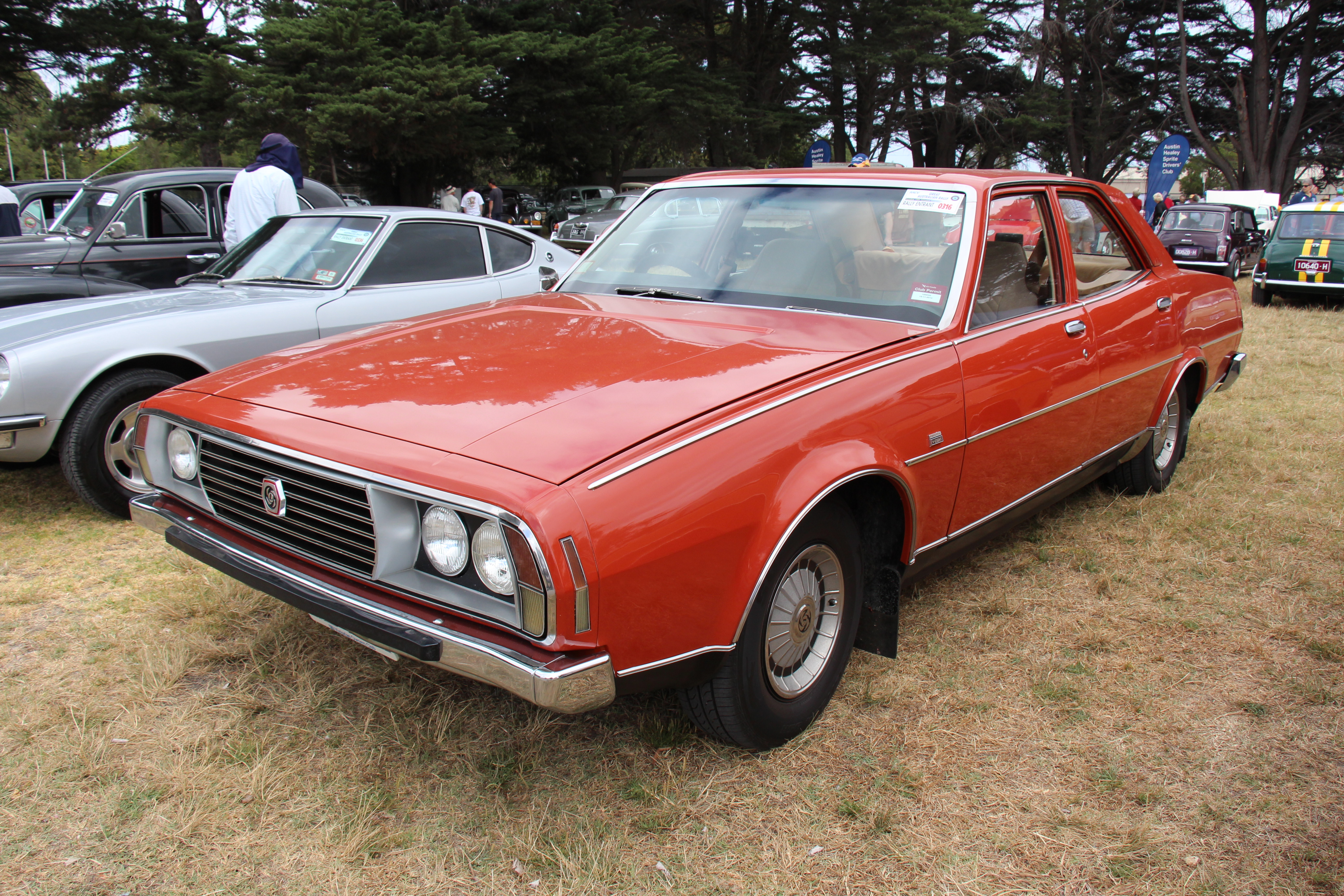
Leyland P76

The Leyland P76 was a large car produced by Leyland Australia, the Australian subsidiary of British Leyland. The car was intended to provide the company with a genuine rival to large local models such as the Ford Falcon, the Holden Kingswood, and the Chrysler Valiant. However, for several reasons— the 1973 oil crisis, a small development budget of only A$20 million, and demand far exceeding supply—Leyland rushed the assembly process for the first P76s coming off the assembly line, resulting in poor build quality and some reliability problems. The combination of the rushed assembly, fuel crisis, and strikes at the component manufacturers' factories resulted in the Leyland P76 becoming a failure and earning lasting critical derision—despite being designed by Giovanni Michelotti and receiving the Wheels magazine Car of the Year award in 1973. Sales were so poor that Leyland closed its Zetland production plant for the P76 in 1974, thereby cancelling plans for a production station wagon and a coupe version. The website The Conversation named it "our [Australia's] worst car failure"; the Royal Automobile Club of Victoria (RACV) and the website Drive.com.au named it among the worst Australian cars of all time; and Wheels and the website CarsGuide named it among the worst cars ever made. The Sydney Morning Herald newspaper wrote:

Mention really bad Australian cars and the name that usually springs to mind is the Leyland P76. This was not so much a bad car as a badly built car. This was Leyland Australia in its dying days with a dysfunctional management giving orders to get cars out the door whether they were finished or not. The missing bits could be added later.

=== Ford Mustang II (1974–1978) ===
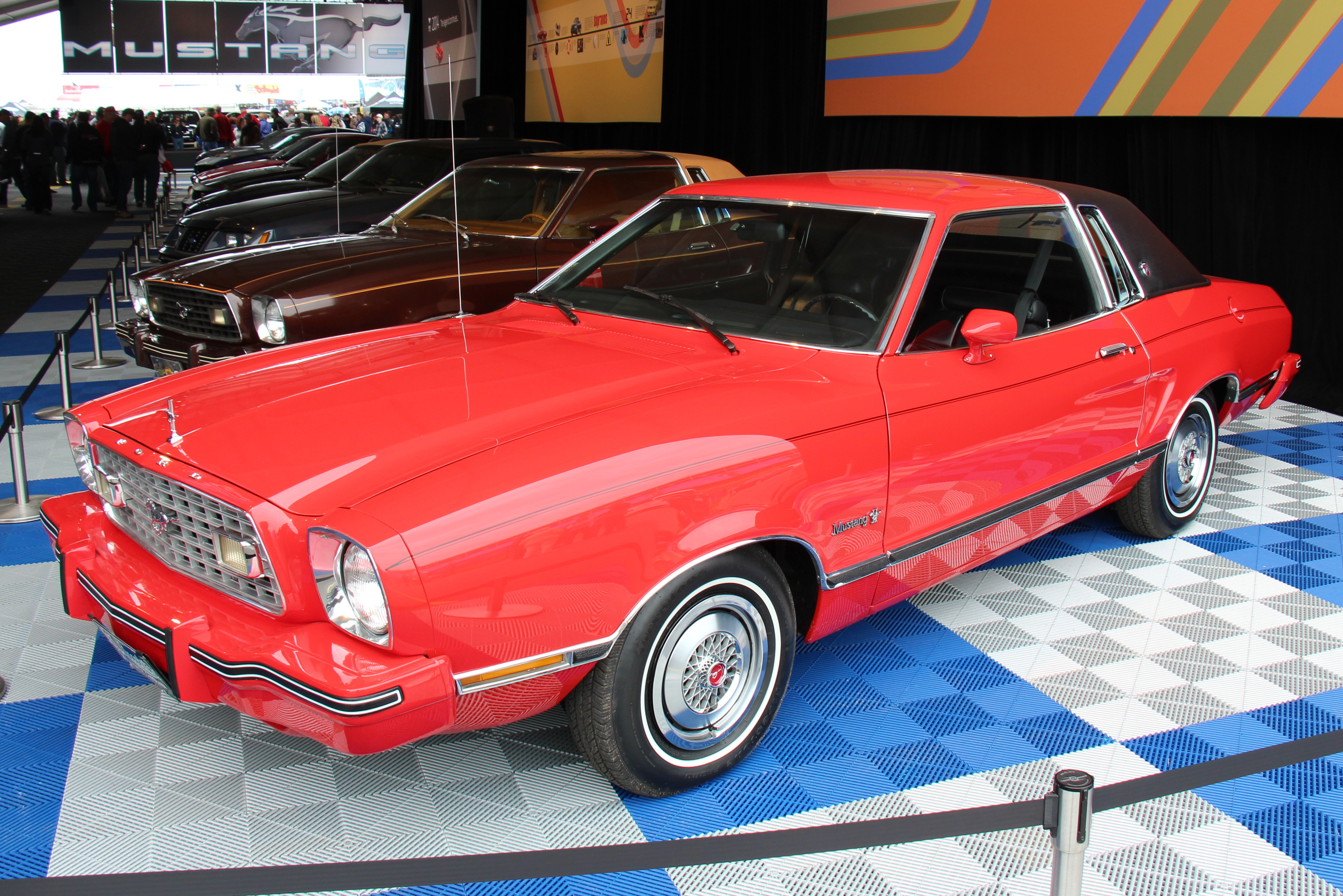
Ford Mustang II coupe

While the Ford Mustang II was well received by both critics and consumers upon launch, today it is strongly criticized for being a poor-performing Pinto derivative, even though the car's good fuel economy made it popular after the 1973 oil crisis. Car and Driver listed the Mustang II as one of the 10 most embarrassing award winners, stating, "Instead of the powerful car the Mustang had been, here was a poser with wheezing four- and six-cylinder engines under the hood. And except for better fuel economy, there were no compensating virtues." Autoblog named the Mustang II as one of the "20 Dumbest Cars of All Time"; the blog claimed that for the car to have been named the 1974 Motor Trend Car of the Year, "Motor Trend, back in the day, had to be trading annual honors for ad pages."

Eric Peters wrote about the Mustang II in his book Automotive Atrocities!: The Cars We Love to Hate, "Reeling, wild-eyed and increasingly desperate in the wake of the 1973 oil crisis and new emission requirements from the EPA, Ford belched up the Pinto-sourced, "downsized" Mustang II—a car with all the kick of a watered-down Shirley Temple". Edmunds ranked the Mustang II as the second worst car of all time, describing it as "instantly appalling to Mustang lovers".

=== AMC Pacer (1975–1980) ===
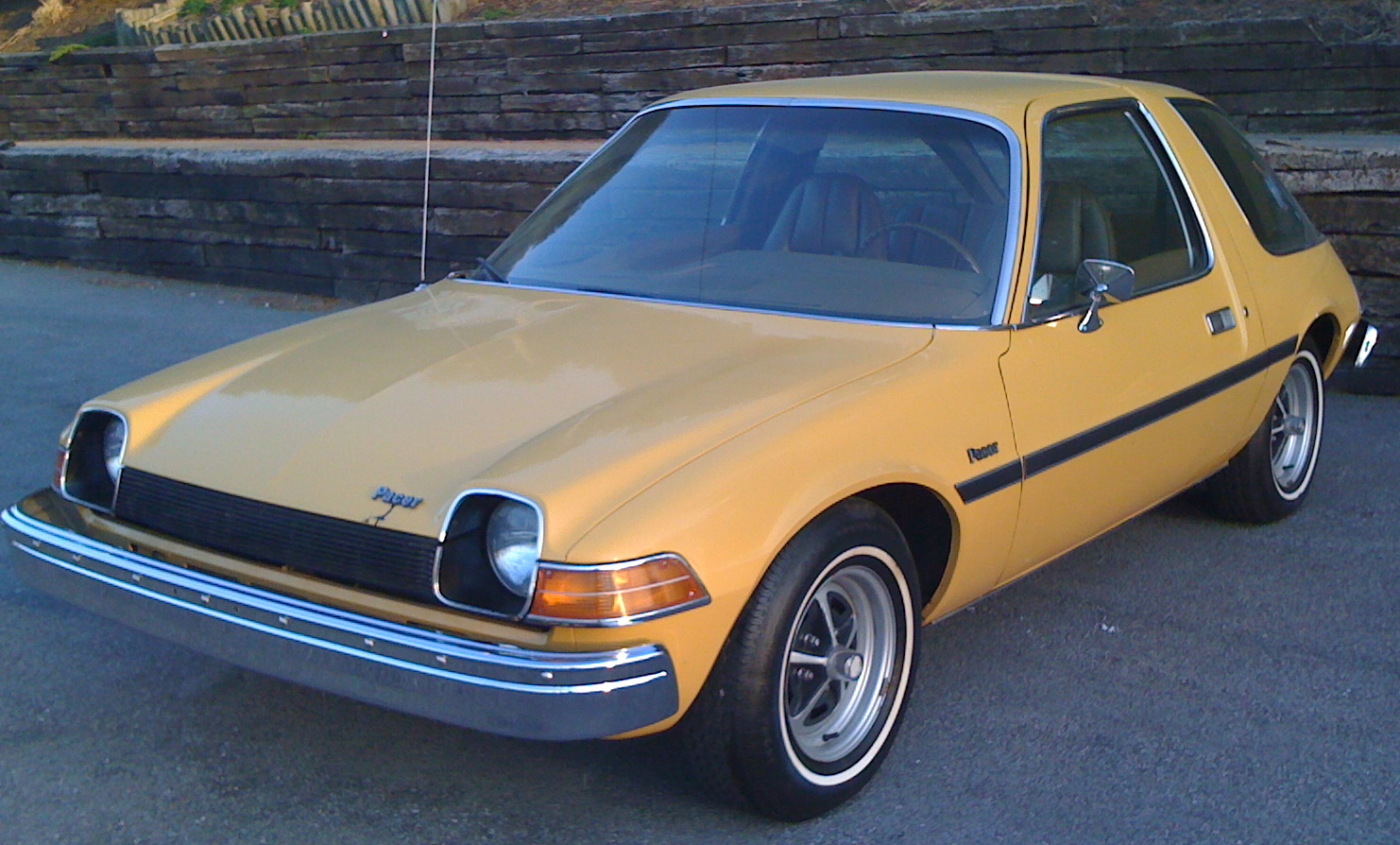
AMC Pacer

Intended to be a radically new concept, as well as being the first automobile to use cab-forward design, the AMC Pacer's odd styling has been criticized. The car was designed from the inside out with the objectives of passenger space and comfort at a time when most cars "were designed purely on looks and the interior only fitted later in whatever space was available." A 2007 survey of its clients by the Hagerty Insurance Agency named the Pacer the worst car design of all time. Including it in Time's "50 Worst Cars of All Time", Dan Neil described the Pacer as a "glassine bolus of dorkiness" and said that "in the summer, it was like being an ant under a mean kid's magnifying glass. The air conditioning was non-existent. You could actually see fumes of volatile petrochemicals out-gassing from the plastic dash." CNN named the Pacer as one of "The 10 Most Questionable Cars of All Time": "The bulbous, blobby Pacer is remembered today as the ultimate example of 'the nerdy car my parents drove.' (Its starring role in the 1992 geeksploitation flick Wayne's World didn't help.)"

The car is included in the book Automotive Atrocities!: The Cars We Love to Hate, which prominently features the Pacer on the cover. The car's entry in the book says that the Pacer

defined the 1970s even more than a Bee Gees 8-track, the "Farrah" hairstyle, or the leisure suit. In fact, wearing a leisure suit and listening to a Bee Gees 8 track while driving to your job as assistant manager at the local McDonald's was perhaps the ultimate 1970s experience.

The book also noted the Pacer's newfound collector status as a piece of kitsch, saying, "As a car, it isn't much—but as a conversation piece, it's almost as good as having a restored Elvis: Alive! pinball machine in your den." Edmunds ranked the Pacer as the 20th worst car of all time, describing it as "an icon of disenfranchised losers". Whether admired or derided, the wide-bodied Pacer "is not only immediately recognizable, it's legendary."

=== Bricklin SV-1 (1975) ===
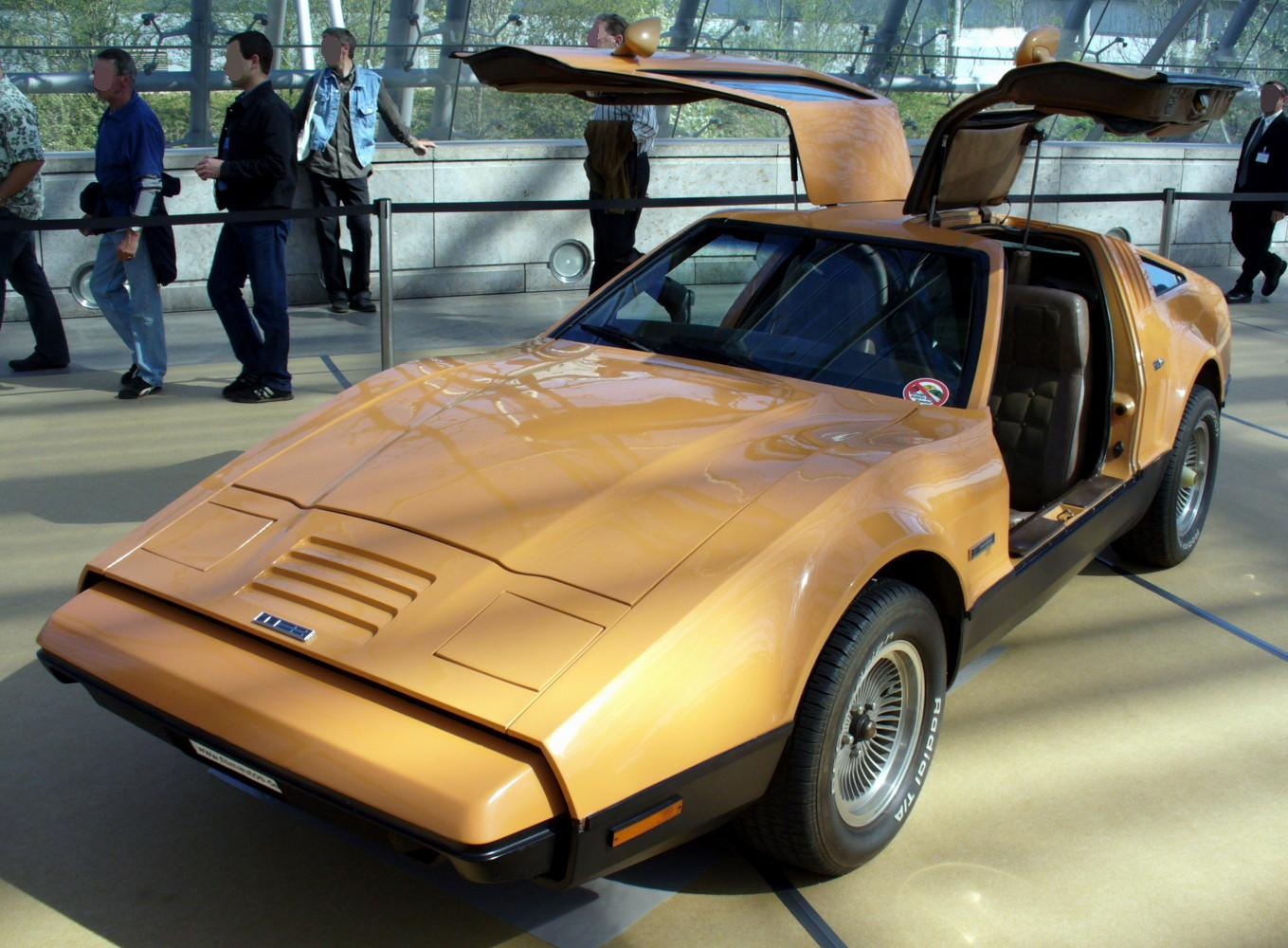
Bricklin SV-1

The Bricklin SV-1 was created by the automotive entrepreneur Malcolm Bricklin, who obtained funding from the government of the Canadian province of New Brunswick to develop and produce the car. Production stopped in early 1976 when the company went into receivership. Including the Bricklin on its list of "The 20 Dumbest Cars of All Time", Autoblog wrote,

Memo to the world: When an automobile executive starts a new car company and proposes to name the car after himself, run like a stag in the opposite direction, lock your check book and credit cards in a safe and ask your best friend to keep the combination away from you no matter how much you beg for it. This scenario never turns out well.

Including it in his book Automotive Atrocities!: The Cars We Love to Hate, Eric Peters acknowledged the numerous safety features that the Bricklin helped to pioneer before writing,

In theory, it all sounded fabulous. ... But the SV1 was basically a kit car cobbled together using mish-mashed leftovers acquired from Ford and American Motors. Lack of money and technical and engineering resources was evident in the way the car was put together. It had the look and feel of a teenage hot rod project built in the backyard with a Sawzall and some RTV.

The Bricklin was named one of the 50 worst cars ever by Time, with Dan Neil saying of it,

The SV1 was supposed to exemplify the safer car of the future; the name stands for "Safety Vehicle 1". The bodies were made of brightly colored, dent-resistant plastic, like PlaySkool furniture. Another safety feature: incredible, crust-of-the-Earth-cooling slowness. All those resin panels and compressible bumpers added hundreds of pounds that the emissions-limited V8s couldn't handle. This thing couldn't outrun the Rose Bowl Parade.

Edmunds ranked the Bricklin as the 72nd worst car of all time, claiming that it "makes the DeLorean look like an engineering magnum opus."

=== Triumph TR7 (1975–1981) ===
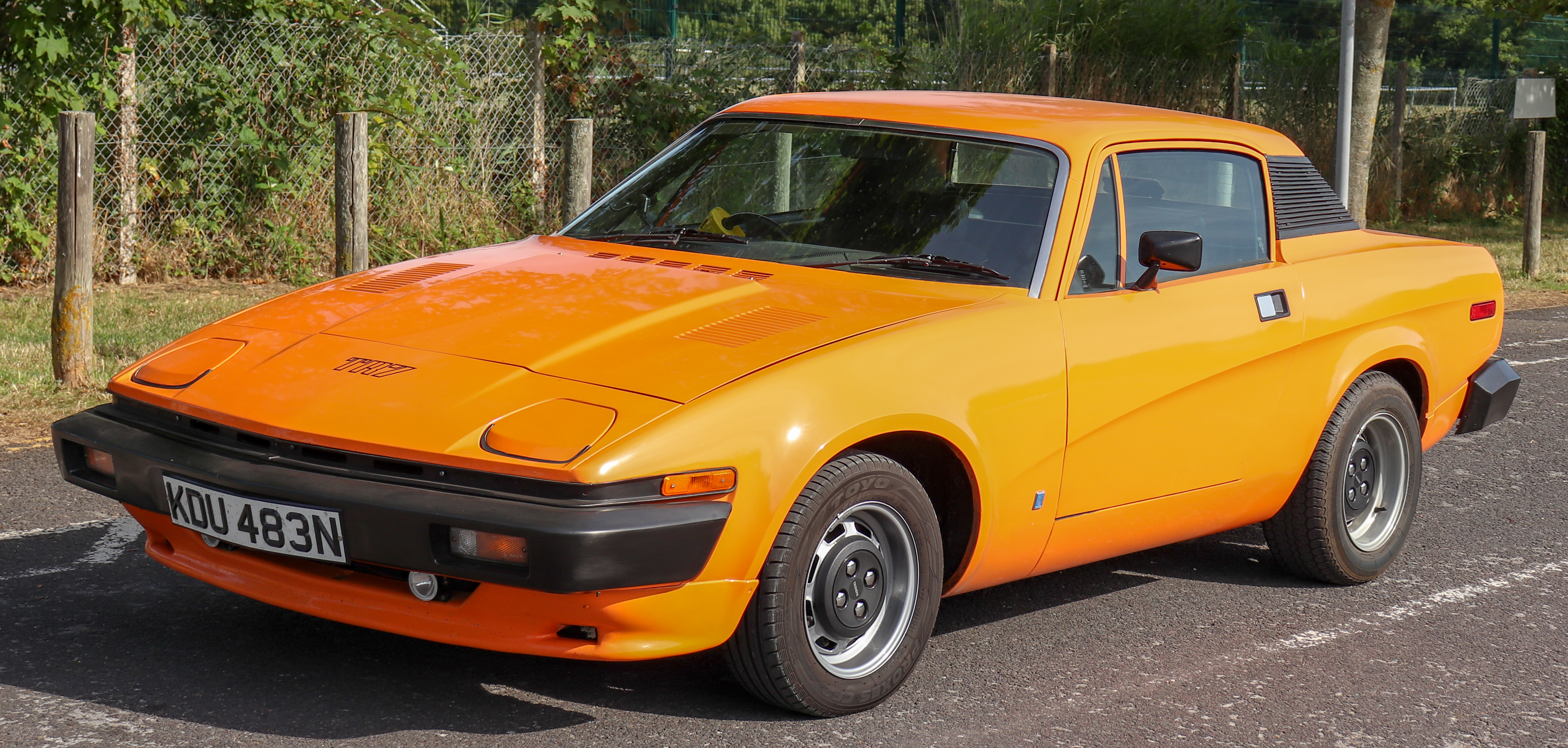
Triumph TR7

The Triumph TR7 was one of the last models produced by Triumph before the brand was discontinued by British Leyland in 1984. The TR7 was widely criticized and ridiculed for its styling, especially the strange curve on its side. A popular urban legend says that upon the car's debut, the famous Italian auto designer Giorgetto Giugiaro examined a TR7 at an auto show, walked around to the other side of the car, and exclaimed, "Oh my God—they did it [the curve] to the other side, too!" Quality problems tended to undermine the car's image in the marketplace. This resulted primarily from poor relations between management and the workforce, as well as frequent strikes at the Speke factory near Liverpool. Furthermore, the TR7 was designed to be a roadster, but the car was initially available only with a permanent roof, because proposed rollover safety regulations in the US—the car's intended target market—threatened to effectively ban the sale of convertibles. However, this ban did not occur, so a convertible version of the TR7 became available in 1979. Quality also improved when production was moved to the Canley plant in Coventry, and later to Solihull, but it was too late to save the car's damaged reputation. An attempt to boost sales with an updated and more powerful V8 version called TR8 also failed: this version suffered from poor build quality, as well as a strong British pound that made the car expensive compared to most of its competitors on the US and Canadian market. In its Frankfurt Motor Show preview edition of September 1977, the German magazine Auto, Motor und Sport reported that the engine of a TR7 press car had broken down and "started to boil" while undergoing an exercise to measure maximum speed over a 4 km (2.5 miles) stretch of track as part of a road test.

The car was included on Time's list of the 50 worst cars of all time; Dan Neil wrote that the main issue with the TR7 was that "the cars were so horribly made. The thing had more short-circuits than a mixing board with a bong spilled on it." Jeremy Clarkson criticized the TR7 and destroyed one in his DVD special Heaven and Hell. Edmunds ranked the TR7 as the 47th worst car of all time. British Leyland stopped production of the TR7 in 1981; although the Triumph brand survived for another three years, the company did not build a replacement sports car, as the market for affordable sports cars was in decline—a factor that also contributed towards BL's decision not to replace the MG B.

=== Chevrolet Chevette (1976–1987) ===
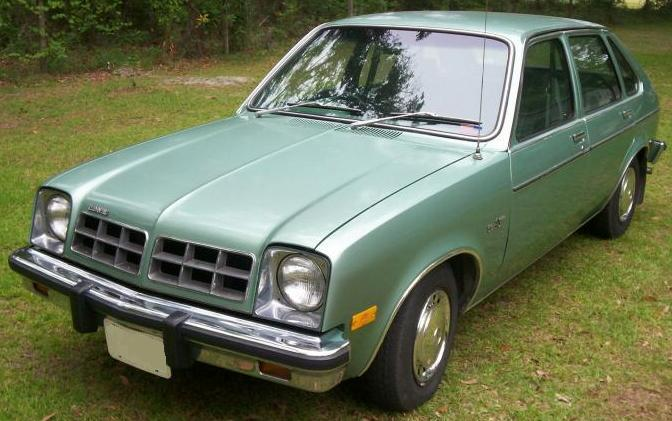
Chevrolet Chevette

The Chevrolet Chevette has commonly been criticized for poor performance (0 to 60 mph in 19.6 seconds), poor build quality, and a generally cheap feel. The car has been included in Time's list of the 50 worst cars of all time; it placed fifth in Car Talk's poll "Worst Car of the Millennium"; and it is included in the book Automotive Atrocities!: The Cars We Love to Hate by Eric Peters. In his comments, Peters poked fun at the Chevette's name, suggesting,

Owners of Chevy's austere little econobox could also casually mention their "'Vette" parked outside to comely (if gullible) prospects at singles bars—though it was critical that said prospects consume a minimum of three double-strong Long Island Iced Teas before suggesting a ride back to your parents' basement.

CNN included the Chevette on its list of the "10 Most Questionable Cars of All Time", where it was described as "Pathetic". CNN expanded on this by describing the Chevette as

Another GM attempt to compete against small, inexpensive imports. And, again, this one wasn't a market flop. In fact, the Chevette was the best-selling small car in America for the 1979 and 1980 model years. Ultimately, 2.7 million were produced over its lifetime. But it is remembered today for being mechanically troubled, poorly constructed and underpowered, a sad reminder of the trouble Detroit automakers had (and still have) in responding to the flood of small, cheap cars from Japan.

Popular Mechanics included the Chevette on its list of "10 Cars that Damaged GM's Reputation" because the car was used as GM's response to advanced, front-wheel-drive subcompacts—such as the Volkswagen Rabbit and Honda Civic—despite the Chevette's poor performance, technologically crude rear-wheel-drive platform, and poorly packaged interior: "it was always a car that sold strictly on price, with no real virtues of its own." Popular Mechanics also noted how the Chevette's success and long production run allowed GM to not develop a proper front-wheel-drive subcompact; instead, the company used a series of badge-engineered captive imports from Suzuki, Isuzu and Daewoo to serve as Chevrolet's entry-level models after Chevette production ended, something the magazine described as "one of the company's greatest missteps of all". Edmunds listed the Chevette as the 53rd worst car of all time. The European version of the Chevrolet Chevette, sold as the Vauxhall Chevette in the UK and the Opel Kadett City in the rest of Europe, was more popular and had a better reputation; in the case of Vauxhall, in particular, the Chevette helped to increase its maker's market share.

=== General Motors cars with Oldsmobile diesel engines (1978–1985) ===
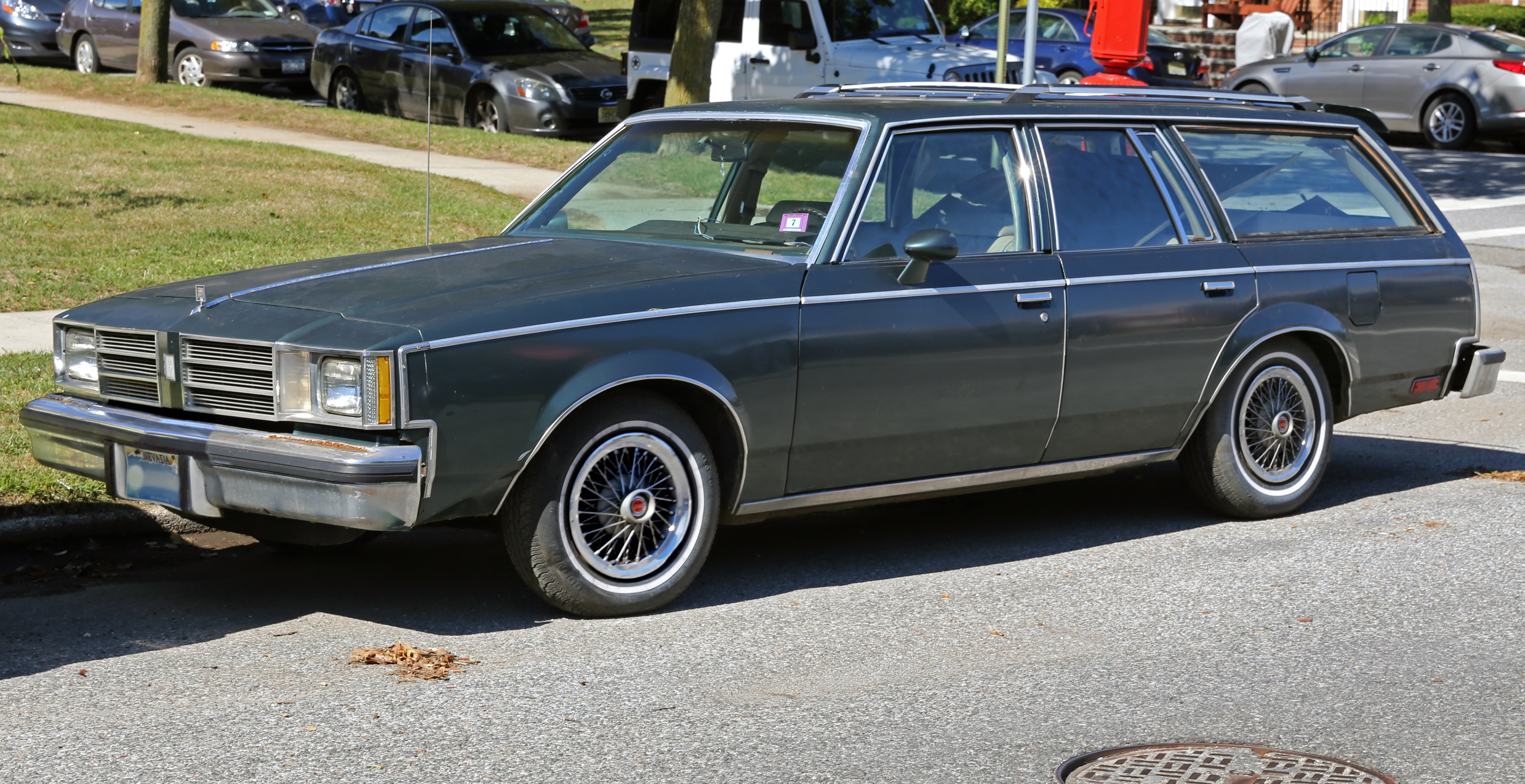
1981 Oldsmobile Cutlass Cruiser with diesel engine

The Oldsmobile diesel engine was one of the first attempts by a US car maker to produce a diesel engine, a result of the 1973 oil crisis and the increasing success of European car makers—mainly Mercedes-Benz and Volkswagen—in selling diesel cars on the US market. The engine was used not only in Oldsmobile cars, but in cars of other General Motors US market brands as well. However, the engine had a significant shortcoming: it was based on the same block design as gasoline engines. For this reason, the head bolts were too weak for a diesel engine, and it soon gained a reputation for unreliability and poor performance that damaged the North American market for diesel passenger cars for the next 30 years. General Motors offered diesel options on some of its small cars, but none of them sold well until the introduction of the 2014 Chevrolet Cruze.

The online marketplace Autotrader described the problems:

There were two key problems with the Olds diesels. First, the head bolts simply weren't numerous or strong enough for the diesel's high compression ratio, so they started blowing head gaskets. Second big problem: GM's cost-cutters decided not to fit a water separator. Unlike gasoline, diesel fuel is subject to water condensation—hence the need for a water separator. Without one, water in the fuel becomes water in the engine, where it can rust either the cylinders or the complicated mechanical fuel injection pump. The former could destroy the engine, while the latter would denigrate the engine's running characteristics and possibly deep-six the pump—which, in a mechanically injected diesel, is an incredibly intricate and complicated device that is very expensive to replace.

Popular Mechanics included the Oldsmobile diesel engines in a series on "The Top Automotive Engineering Failures", saying,

Of the myriad engineering failures from the reckless period at the end of the 1970s and the dawn of the '80s, the one with perhaps the longest-reaching effect on consumer preference was the unrelenting awfulness of the Oldsmobile diesels. While European nations and much of the rest of the world are embracing the excellence of modern small diesel engines, the oily film of failure from these hastily engineered lumps lingers on the American palate.

Edmunds and the financial website TheStreet both ranked the 1979 Oldsmobile Cutlass Supreme Diesel the 10th worst car of all time.

=== FSO Polonez (1978–2002) ===
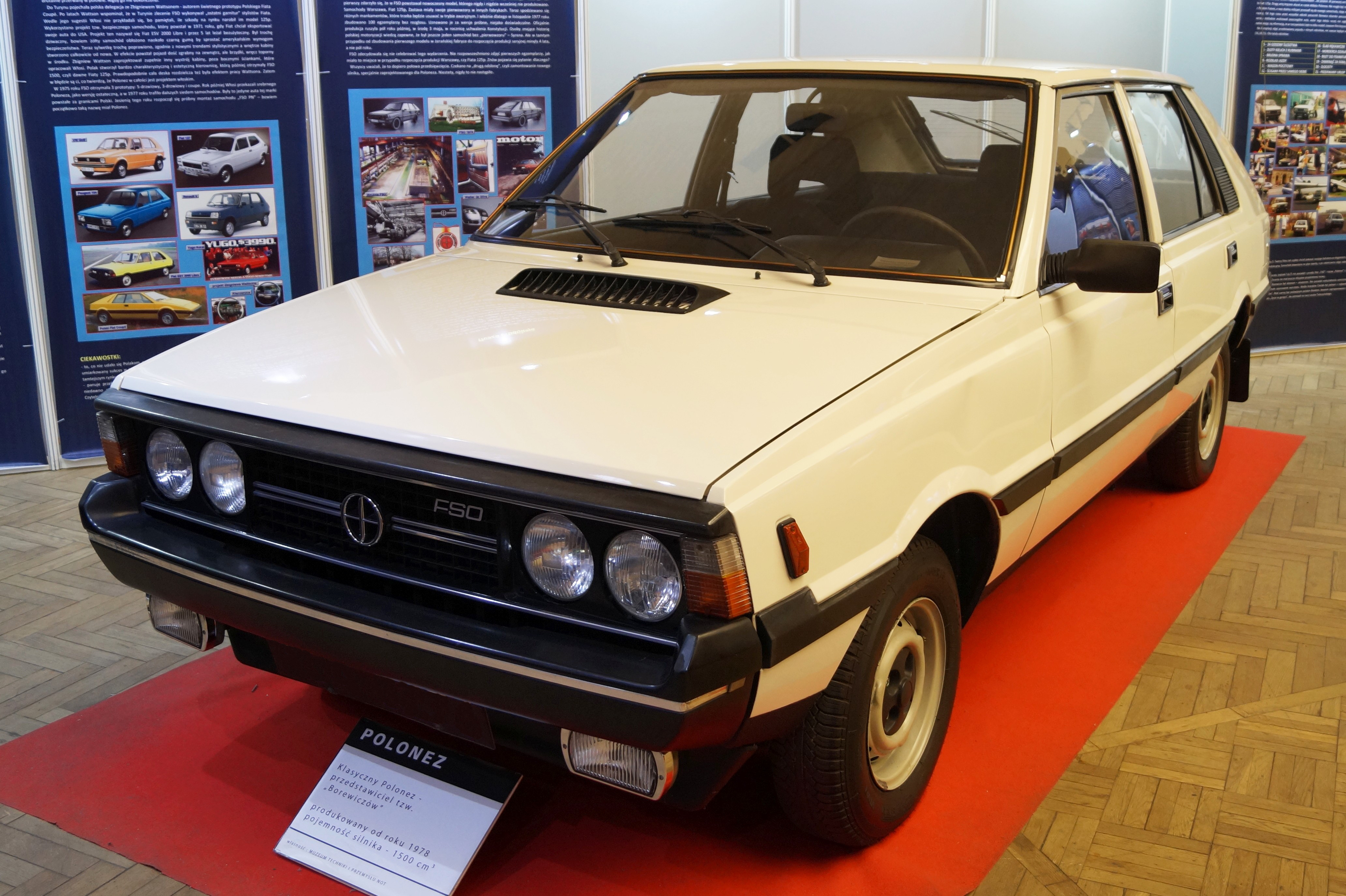
FSO Polonez

The FSO Polonez was based largely on the Polski Fiat 125p, which had been manufactured in Poland by FSO since 1967, but the Polonez featured an entirely new hatchback body designed by Giugiaro. The car was ambitious for its time, being the first Polish-built car to feature a hatchback body and the first mass-produced Polish car to have its own design; however, the car was poorly received in most markets outside Eastern Europe because of its poor quality, poor design, and poor performance. Jeremy Clarkson said about the Polonez, "Built by communists out of steel so thin you could use it as a net curtain, it is as reliable and long-lasting as a pensioner's erection", "Of course history has served up many cars that drove as badly as this, but few looked quite so terrible" and "[it] did have a redeeming feature—it was cheap. But it had to be, because it was a car that wasn't really a car at all. It was a box under which the careless car buyer would discover a '40s tractor."

In a Top Gear episode titled "The Worst Car In The History Of The World", Jeremy Clarkson drove a Polonez on a country road where it broke down twice; in addition, he blew up two cars in an automotive game of Conkers on one of his videos. He said,

I often wondered what drove Lech Wałęsa to stand up to the mightiest military machine the world has ever seen? Why did a shipyard worker from Gdańsk take on the Soviet Union? By now is all becoming abundantly clear. The man wanted a new car!!!

TheStreet ranked the car sixth in its list of the 20 Worst Cars of All Time, and it was voted the ninth worst car of all time in a poll by Auto Express. The Polonez was updated in 1991 to become the Caro, and it continued in this form until production ended in 2002, although imports to most markets in Western Europe had already ended by that time, largely because of low demand.

== 1980s ==
=== Chevrolet Corvette 305 "California" (1980) ===
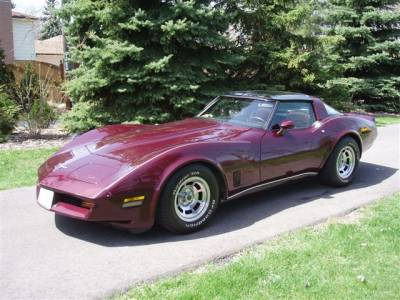
1980 Chevrolet Corvette

Emission requirements in the US state of California are frequently stricter than those in the rest of the country; they required that all Corvettes sold in the state during the 1980 model year be fitted with a 180-horsepower 305 cu. in. "small-block" V8 engine with a 3-speed automatic transmission. This model of Corvette is particularly derided for its poor performance. Edmunds ranked the model the third-worst Corvette of all time, Time listed it as one of the 50 worst cars of all time, and it is included in Automotive Atrocities! The Cars We Love to Hate by Eric Peters. Dan Neil wrote of the 1980 small-block Corvette,

[California state regs] required that the barely adequate 350 cu in (5.7 L) small-block in the 1980 Corvette be replaced with a wholly inadequate 305 V8, putting out 180 hp of pure shame. On top of that, the "California" Corvette sucked its pitiful rivulet of horsepower through the straw of a torque-sapping three-speed automatic transmission. ... These were dark days indeed.

Eric Peters noted in the Automotive Atrocities that the 305 Corvette is today rejected by enthusiasts; it is omitted from official histories; and collector guides advise buyers to avoid this model, as it will never appreciate significantly in value.

=== General Motors X platform compact cars (1980–1985) ===
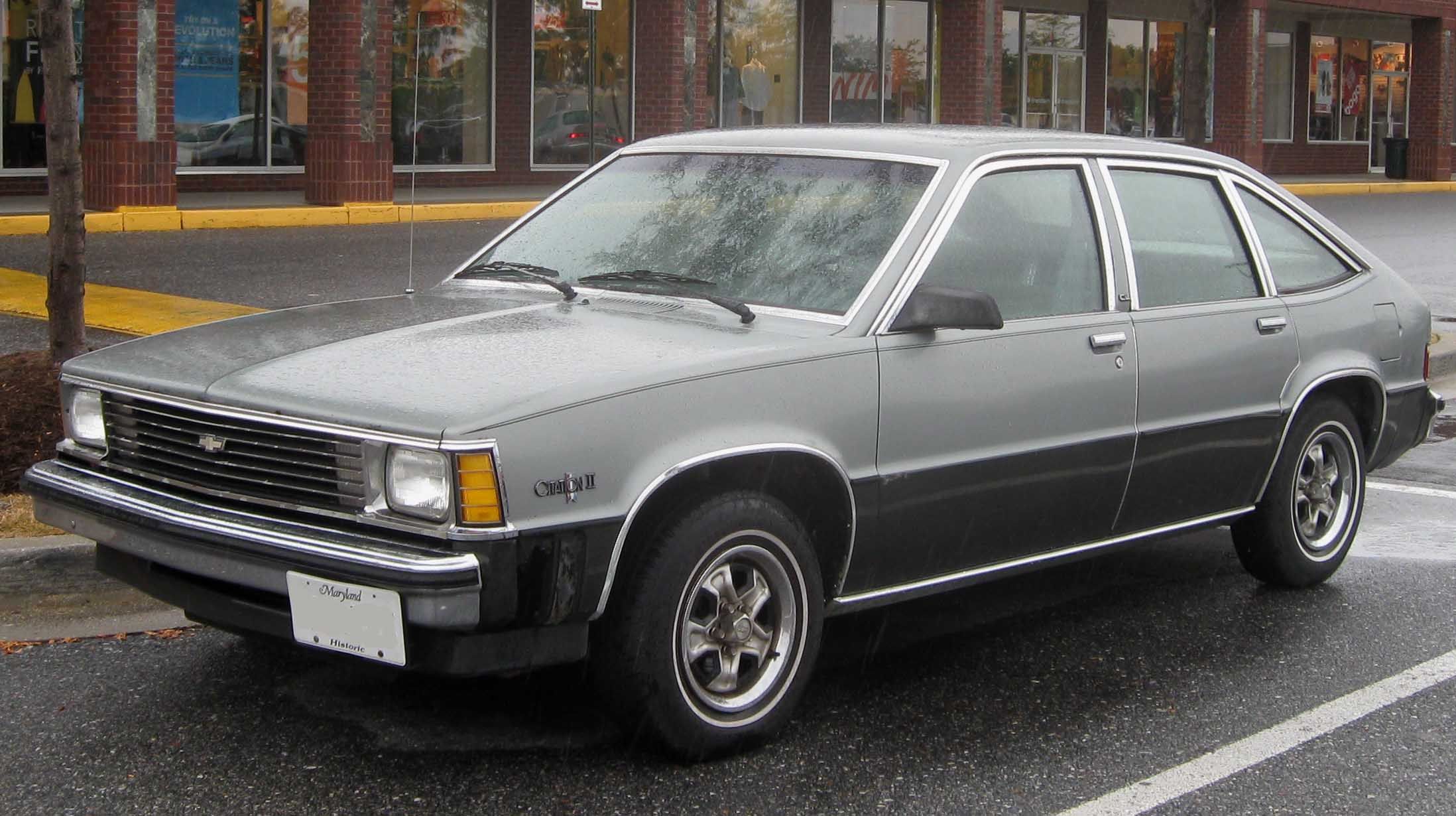
Chevrolet Citation

When the Chevrolet Citation—also sold as the Pontiac Phoenix, the Oldsmobile Omega, and the Buick Skylark—was introduced in early 1979, it received a strongly positive response: the Citation was the 1980 Motor Trend Car of the Year and sold more than 800,000 units in its first year. However, the car received scrutiny for numerous safety and quality issues, which led to a record number of recalls and a collapse in sales. Car and Driver named the Citation one of the most embarrassing award winners in history because of its numerous build quality and safety issues:

Things started going terribly wrong as soon as the X-car got in the hands of consumers. While staring down 60-month payment books, Citation owners were having trim bits fall off in their hands, hearing their transmissions groan and seize, and finding that if they listened closely enough they could hear their cars rust. As GM's first front-drive compacts, the X-cars were significant vehicles: They slaughtered GM's reputation for a whole generation.

Car and Driver and several other car magazines at the time were deceived when GM lent them specially modified versions of the X-body vehicles, in which heavy torque steer (for which the cars became infamous) had been engineered out. Patrick Bedard of Car and Driver said that the magazine was surprised by this when they drove a random production version acquired from a car-rental company sometime later. Popular Mechanics named the X platform cars on its list of "10 Cars that Damaged GM's Reputation" as it "promised a revolution in how the corporation designed and built cars. Unfortunately, the reality was that these four- and six-cylinder cars probably suffered more recalls and endemic problems than any other GM vehicle program." The magazine also noted how successful the cars were initially in the marketplace, which "sour[ed] hundreds of thousands on GM." Similarly, The Truth About Cars named the Citation as one of the major "deadly sins" that led to GM's downfall:

Typical for GM, the Citation looked best on paper, or to the automotive writers who were suckered when they drive the most unproduction-like 'ringers' ever hand-assembled and wrote breathless reports on the Citation's spectacular 'better than a BMW' abilities.

Edmunds ranked the Citation as the 52nd worst car of all time.

=== Cadillac V8-6-4 (1981) ===
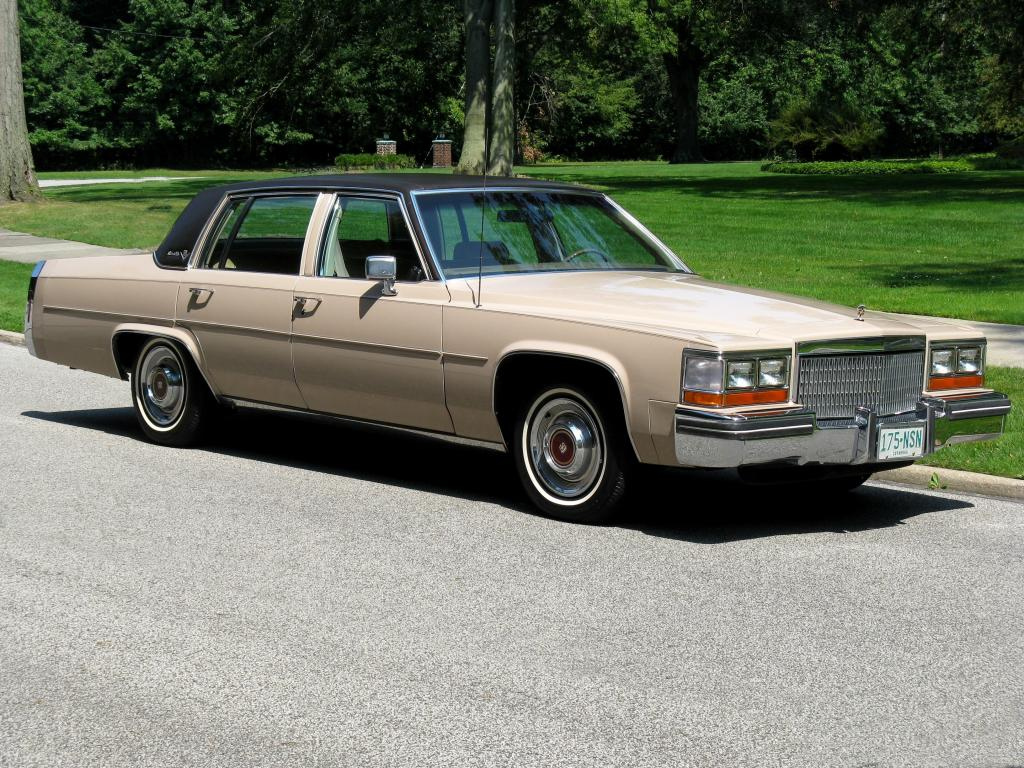
A Cadillac Sedan DeVille, one of the models offered with the V8-6-4 engine.

For the 1981 model year only, Cadillac offered a feature on its V8 engine called the V8-6-4. In this engine, up to four cylinders could be deactivated during cruising to save fuel. However, the system suffered from numerous drivability issues because the computer technology of the period could not deactivate and reactivate the cylinders quickly enough. Many owners were frustrated by the engine's poor performance and had the system disabled by mechanics. Including the engine in Automotive Atrocities! The Cars We Love to Hate, Eric Peters called the V8-6-4 "one of the best ideas gone horribly wrong to ever reach production", and it was "the last thing a by-now-reeling Cadillac needed on top of the still-festering diesel imbroglio."

The V8-6-4 is included in Time's "50 Worst Cars of All Time", where Dan Neil described it as the "Titanic of engine programs". He continued, "The cars jerked, bucked, stalled, made rude noises, and generally misbehaved until wild-eyed owners took the cars to have the system disconnected. For some, it was the last time they ever saw the inside of a Cadillac dealership." Popular Mechanics included the V8-6-4 Cadillacs on its list of "10 Cars that Damaged GM's Reputation", describing the system as "one more half-developed, cynically marketed technology that GM just couldn't make work". Today, cylinder deactivation systems, also known as a fuel management system, are a common feature on large-engined automobiles, including many produced by General Motors.

=== DMC DeLorean (1981–1983) ===
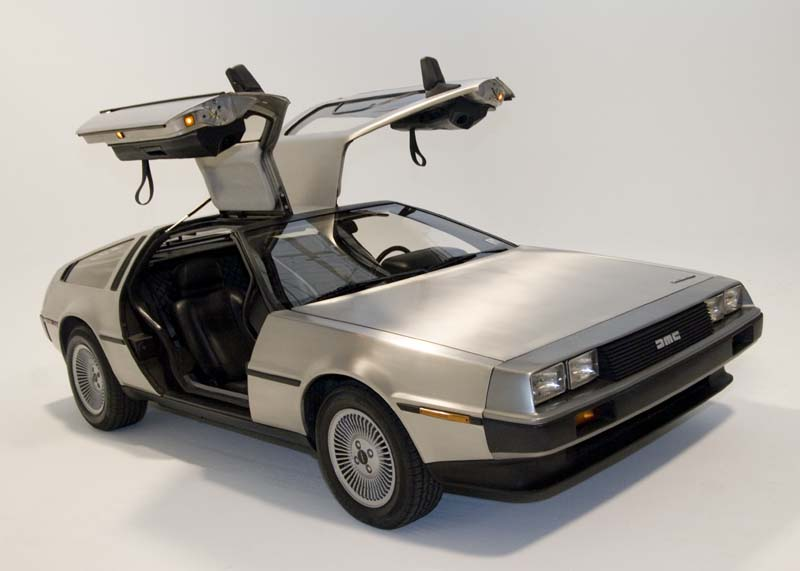
DeLorean

Despite the DeLorean's cult following after being featured in the popular science-fiction film Back to the Future (1985), the car was a commercial failure when introduced, and it was critically derided. It was built in a new, purpose-built factory in Dunmurry, a suburb of Belfast, Northern Ireland, in order to improve the tense socioeconomic situation there. (The Belfast region was one of the poorest in Western Europe due to the ongoing Northern Ireland conflict.) The car was largely funded by the UK Government, which backed the project with £55 million. However, because of the inexperience of the Northern Irish workforce and an underdeveloped design, the car suffered from poor quality and disappointing performance. Even hiring Lotus Cars founder Colin Chapman to assist in improving the vehicle did not help. Furthermore, the DeLorean was overpriced; it was released at a time when the United States, the car's target market, was hit by a recession that decreased demand for expensive supercars. Including the DeLorean in Automotive Atrocities! The Cars We Love to Hate, Eric Peters stated,

If the DeLorean had offered exotic-level performance to go with its exotic-level price, things might have been different. But as it turned out, the DeLorean was not even competitive as a performance car with the run-of-the-mill six-cylinder Camaros, Firebirds and Mustangs of the era.

Peters also noted that a DeLorean was significantly more expensive than a 1981 Chevrolet Corvette.

In his book Naff Motors: 101 Automotive Lemons, Tony Davis described the DeLorean's build quality as "woeful". Top Gear writer Richard Porter included the car in Crap Cars, calling it "dismal". The car was also included on Time's list of the 50 worst cars of all time; Dan Neil said of it,

By the time Johnny Z. got the factory in Northern Ireland up and running—and what could possibly go wrong there?—the losses were piling up fast. The car was heavy, underpowered (the 2.8-liter Peugeot V6 never had a chance) and overpriced.

=== Maserati Biturbo (1981–1994) ===
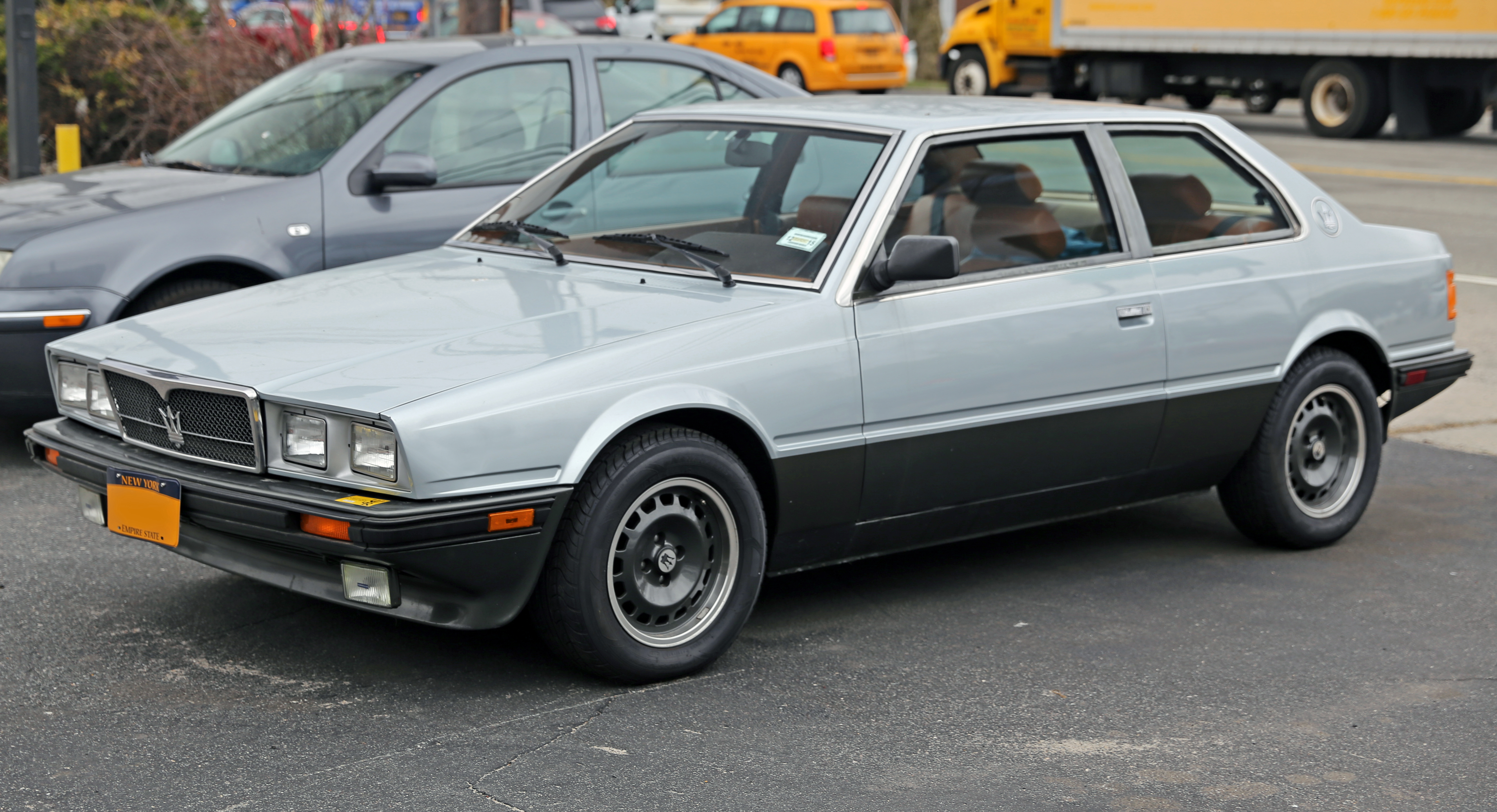
Maserati Biturbo

The Maserati Biturbo was an executive grand tourer (high-performance luxury car) that was intended to compete mainly with the BMW 3 Series car. However, the Biturbo received a negative reception for its new twin-turbocharged engine—which led to unpredictable power delivery because of its turbo lag—and its numerous reliability problems. Including the car in Time's list of "The 50 Worst Cars of All Time", Dan Neil wrote, "Everything that could leak, burn, snap or rupture did so with the regularity of the Anvil Chorus. The collected service advisories would look like the Gutenberg Bible." The August 1990 issue of Road & Track said about the Biturbo's reliability,

Mis-set carburetor float levels caused the engine to stumble during left turns, pick-up wires in the distributor cracked from the heat, water ran through cylinder sleeves, fluids leaked from faulty seals throughout the drivetrain, fuse boxes melted, and coolant temperature warning lights came on even when the engines weren't overheating.

Including the Biturbo in Automotive Atrocities! The Cars We Love to Hate, Eric Peters wrote that the Biturbo "would viciously nickel-and-dime its owner to death with 'little things' that would drive all but those truly devoted to its survival into the toolbox for a large ball-peen hammer." In Crap Cars, Richard Porter described the Biturbo's "build quality best described as 'approximate'" and styling that "looks like a child's drawing of a car". Edmunds ranked it the 55th worst car of all time.

=== Renault Fuego (North American version) (1982–1984) ===
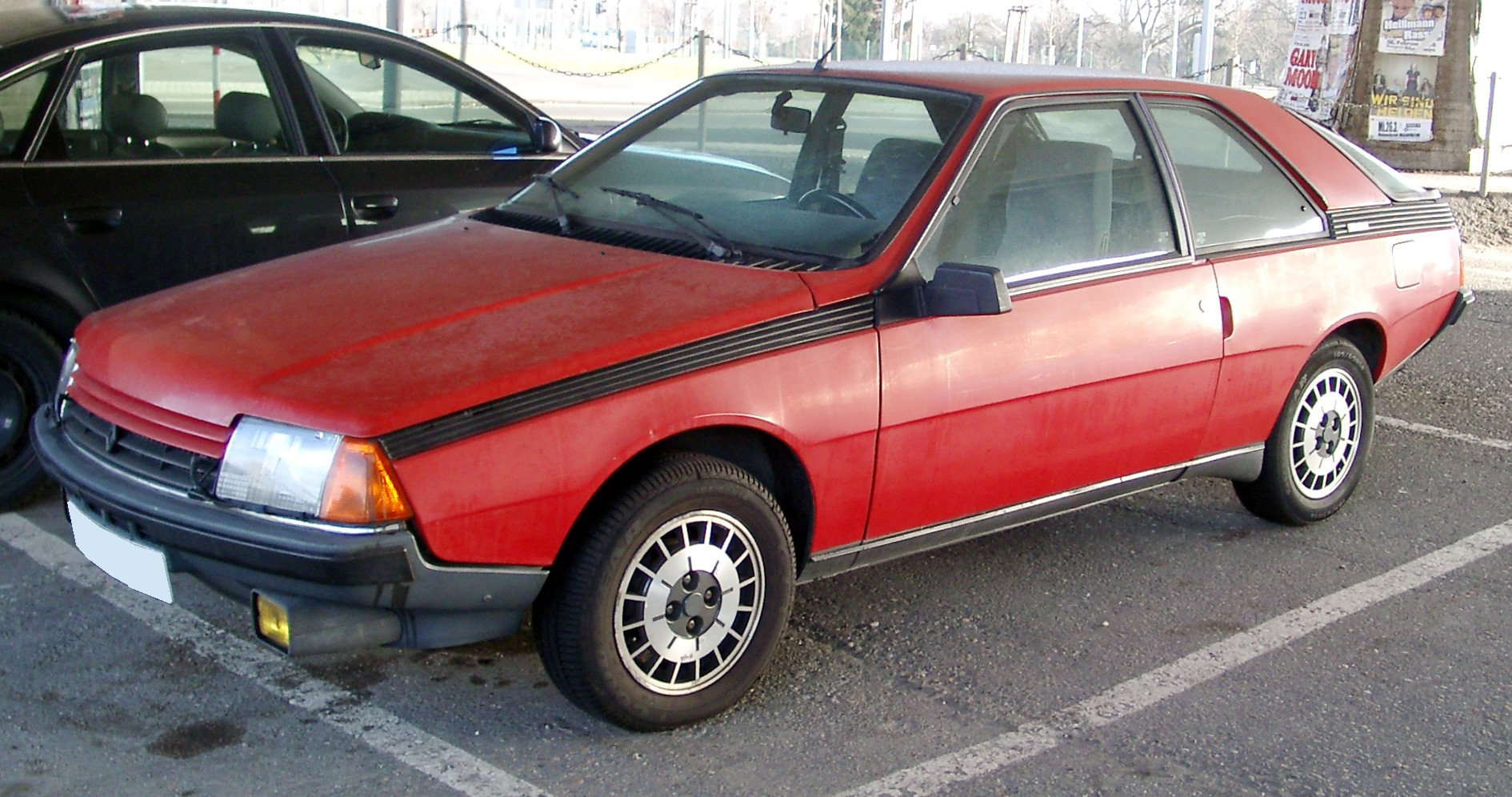
Renault Fuego (European version)

The North American Renault Fuego sports coupe has earned negative recognition retroactively, mainly for its many significant reliability problems. Car and Driver retroactively described the Fuego as being "shaped like a walrus with gas". Hemmings Motor News wrote about how

The Fuego soon developed a reputation for unreliable electronics and overheating issues, which led to head gasket failures if ignored for any length of time. The problem was likely compounded by a poor spare parts availability, a situation that only worsened after Renault's departure from the U.S. in 1986.

Including the car in the book Automotive Atrocities: The Cars We Love to Hate, author Eric Peters made note of Fuego's poor performance and poor reliability, together with difficulty in sourcing replacement parts and finding a mechanic who could service a Renault, leading to rapid depreciation that reduced Fuegos to being worthless when they were only a couple of years old:

The ad copy said the Fuego boasted 'racy good looks that can up the pulse rate on sight,' though it may have more accurately described the heart flutters induced by the Fuego's frighteningly rapid depreciation rates. Running examples are almost worthless today—if, that is, you can find one that's still running.

The Fuego was also listed in Richard Porter's Crap Cars. Edmunds ranked the North American Fuego as the 17th worst car of all time, describing it as a "Fragile, front-drive French coupe that rusted quickly into dust or burst into flames amid random electrical fires" and noted that it was "recalled for steering wheels that came off in drivers' hands."

=== Cadillac Cimarron (1982–1988) ===
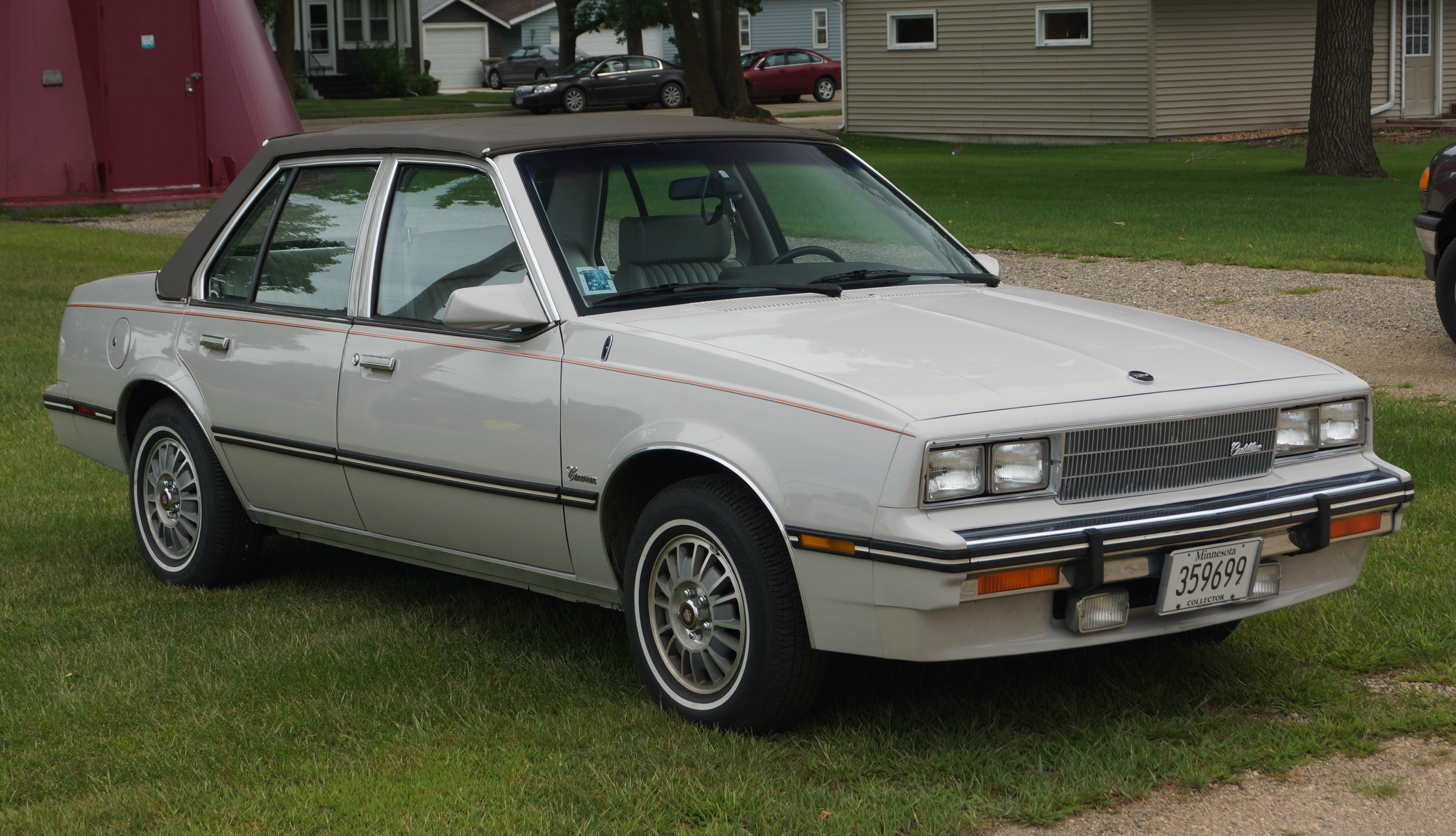
Cadillac Cimarron

The Cadillac Cimarron was a hasty attempt by Cadillac to compete with smaller European luxury cars from manufacturers such as Mercedes-Benz and BMW. Facing time constraints, Cadillac simply marketed a fully equipped Chevrolet Cavalier with upmarket trim for twice the price of the car's J-body siblings. The Cimarron was included in Time's list of "The 50 Worst Cars of All Time", was ranked the eighth worst car of the Millennium by Car Talk, was placed fourth on Autoblog's list of "The 20 Dumbest Cars of All Time", and was included in the books Automotive Atrocities! The Cars We Love to Hate by Eric Peters and Crap Cars by Richard Porter. Dan Neil said of the Cimarron,

Everything that was wrong, venal, lazy and mendacious about GM in the 1980s was crystallized in this flagrant insult to the good name and fine customers of Cadillac. ... This bit of temporizing nearly killed Cadillac and remains its biggest shame.

Autoblog wrote, "It was a rebadged Chevy—a bad Chevy at that—and everyone knew it. Engineers at GM who were ordered to carry out the brief hated working on it. A few, we are told, even took early retirement to get out of it." In Automotive Atrocities, Eric Peters wrote,

In the 1920s and 1930s, Cadillac was a respected peer of Bugatti and Rolls-Royce, the 'standard of the world' among luxury cars. By 1982, GM's premiere division had reduced itself to pawning off tarted-up Chevrolet Cavaliers, hoping no one would notice—at least until after the buyer's check cleared.

Forbes placed the Cimarron on its list of "Legendary Car Flops", citing low sales and poor performance, and noting that the car "didn't work, coming from a luxury brand." The website CNN Money described the Cimarron as "in all important respects, a Chevrolet Cavalier. It also added thousands to the price tag. In all, it was neither a good Cadillac nor a good value. Today, GM executives will readily admit that this was a bad idea."

Car and Driver wrote that a subsequent Cadillac product director kept a picture of the Cimarron on his wall, captioned "Lest we forget." Popular Mechanics named the Cimarron as one of the 10 cars that damaged GM's reputation, describing GM's attempt to market the Cimarron as a domestic alternative to the BMW 3 Series as "pathetic":

There's nothing wrong with the idea of a smaller, more athletic Cadillac. But it was a terrible idea to rebadge the Chevrolet Cavalier and attempt to pawn it off as a true Cadillac. Not surprisingly, practically no one fell for it and the Cimarron never sold well.

The Truth About Cars named the Cimarron as one of the "deadly sins" that led to GM's downfall; author Paul Niedermeyer wrote of it,

Yes, as if there was ever any doubt, GM truly jumped the shark with the Cimarron, and it led the way for what was GM's most disastrous decade ever, the eighties. Only GM could have such utterly outsized hubris to think it could get away with dressing up a Cavalier and pawning it off as a BMW-fighter, without even touching the engine, among other sins. ... the Cimarron was a dud, from the get-go. GM managed to fool some 25k buyers the first year, but sales steadily drooped thereafter. The damage it did to the Cadillac brand was incalculable. But the Cimarron was just one of many wounds of the ritual suicide Cadillac was putting itself through during those dark days.

Edmunds ranked the Cimarron as the eighth worst car of all time.

=== Chevrolet Camaro equipped with the Iron Duke engine (1982–1985) ===
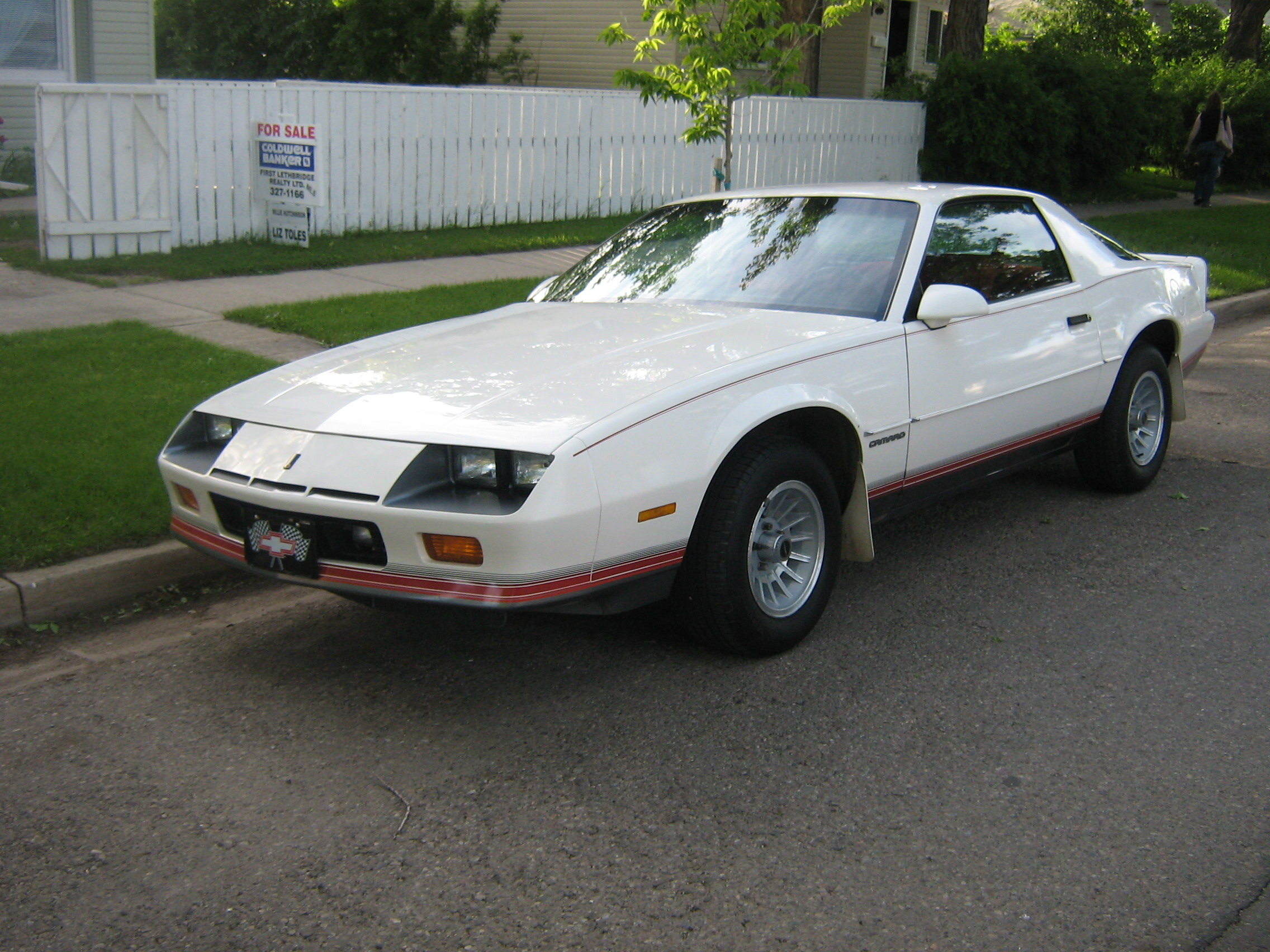
Chevrolet Camaro

For the 1982 product year, the redesigned Chevrolet Camaro offered the 90-horsepower Iron Duke 4-cylinder engine with a 3-speed automatic transmission as its standard power train—an offering that was derided in a car with such a high-performance reputation. Autoweek, describing this model as the slowest Camaro ever sold, made two observations: a Camaro with this power train had the same power-to-weight ratio as the Volkswagen Beetle, and the Chevrolet Chevette had a slightly better ratio. This variant of the Camaro was included in Time's list of "The 50 Worst Cars of All Time"; Dan Neil said of it,

As the base engine for the redesigned 1982 Camaro (and Pontiac Firebird), the 2.5-liter, four-cylinder "Iron Duke" was the smallest, least powerful, most un-Camaro-like engine that could be and, like the California Corvette, it was connected to a low-tech three-speed slushbox. So equipped, the Iron Duke Camaro had 0–60 mph acceleration of around 20 seconds, which left Camaro owners to drum their fingers while school buses rocketed past in a blur of yellow.

Including this car in Automotive Atrocities! The Cars We Love to Hate, Eric Peters wrote that the Camaro equipped with the Iron Duke engine gave owners "the humiliation of being left in the dust by K-car station wagons". This model of the Camaro was ranked the 61st worst car of all time by Edmunds. This engine was dropped in 1986.

=== Holden Camira (1982–1989) ===
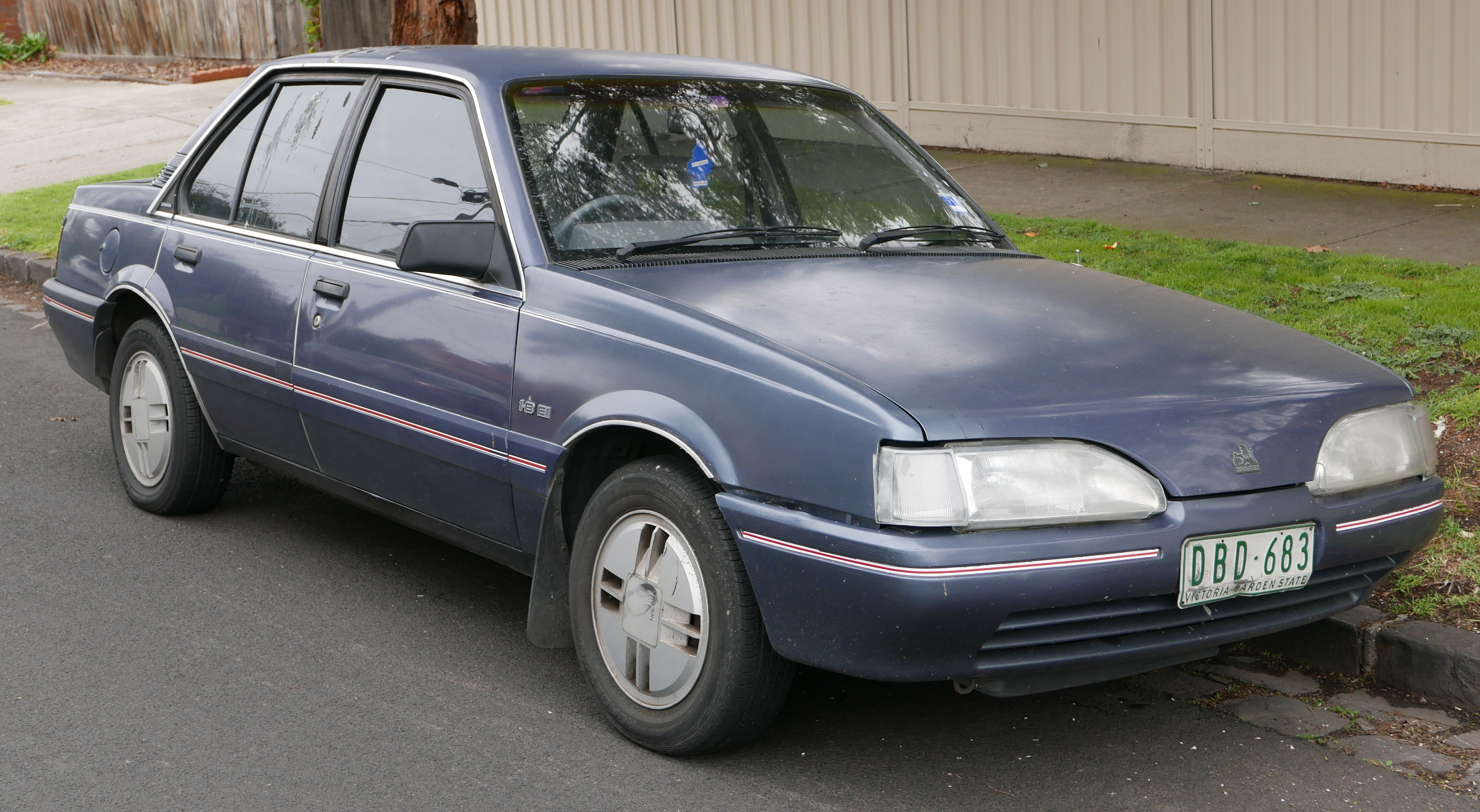
Holden Camira

Introduced in 1982, the Holden Camira was the Australian GM affiliate's version of the company's J-body family of midsize cars, replacing the Torana. Initial sales were good, with the Camira being designated Wheels Car of the Year for 1982. However, its reputation was soon tarnished as numerous quality and reliability issues were uncovered. These included smoking engines, insufficient drainage holes in the doors, poor paint quality, and a lack of adequate fan cooling (resulting in overheating in Camiras fitted with air conditioning). In addition to tarnishing the vehicle's reputation, these problems led to the car's withdrawal from the New Zealand market, where a Camira-labeled Isuzu Aska was sold instead. Moreover, the car's safety record was poor, with Monash University Accident Research Centre finding that, in comparison to other "medium cars", the Camira provided a "significantly worse than average" level of safety in the event of an accident. While later models made progress toward fixing the problems, the combination of negative word-of-mouth and diminishing sales figures eventually led to the Camira's withdrawal in 1989. The Royal Automobile Club of Victoria, Drive.com.au, CarsGuide and Wheels magazine all selected the Camira as one of the worst (or worst Australian) cars of all time.

=== Renault Alliance (1983–1987) ===
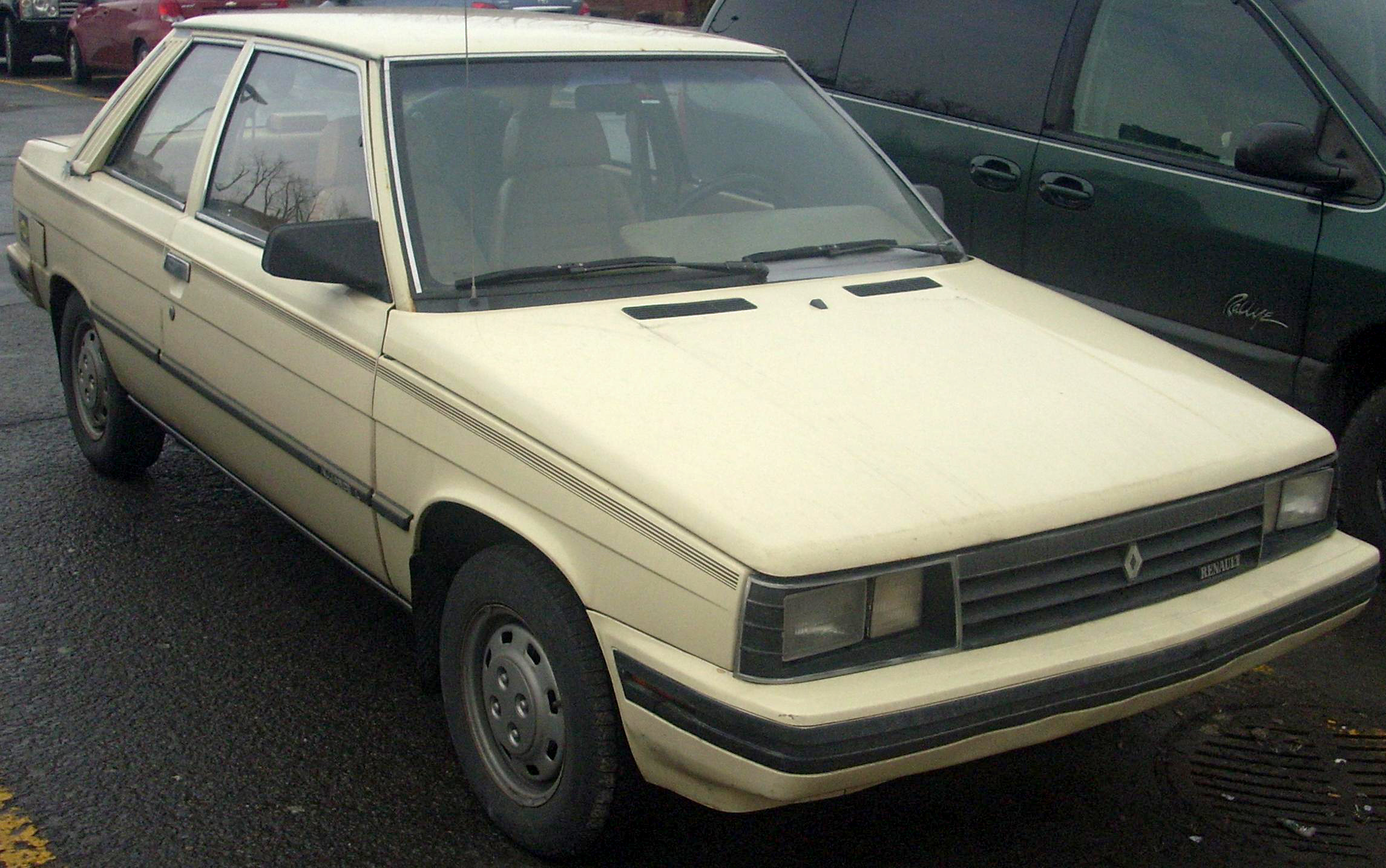
Renault Alliance

Introduced in 1983, the Renault Alliance was a compact car codeveloped by French automaker Renault and American Motors for sale in the United States, sourced from the European-market Renault 11. While initial sales were strong and the car earned critical acclaim, retroactive reviews of the Alliance are strongly negative. Car and Driver included the Alliance on its list of "The 10 Most Embarrassing Award Winners in History"—using the article to apologize for placing the Alliance on its "10 Best" list in 1983—and continued by writing,

The Alliance proved that Wisconsin workers could assemble a Renault with the same indifference to quality that was a hallmark of the French automotive industry. By the late '80s, the sight of rusted Alliances abandoned alongside America's roads was so common that their resale value had dropped to nearly zero.

The Alliance is included twice in Automotive Atrocities! The Cars We Love to Hate, with author Eric Peters giving the Alliance and its high-performance GTA variant separate entries. Peters described the Alliance as a "K-car wannabe" and said of its joint development with Renault, "Not since Thomas Jefferson's Louisiana Purchase. ... had the French agreed to such an ill-conceived deal." Edmunds ranked the Alliance as the 12th worst car of all time. The European version, while in production from 1983 to 1988, was more popular and did not suffer such a negative reputation; the saloon model from which it was derived—the Renault 9—was even voted European Car of the Year soon after its launch in 1981.

=== Alfa Romeo Arna (1983–1987) ===
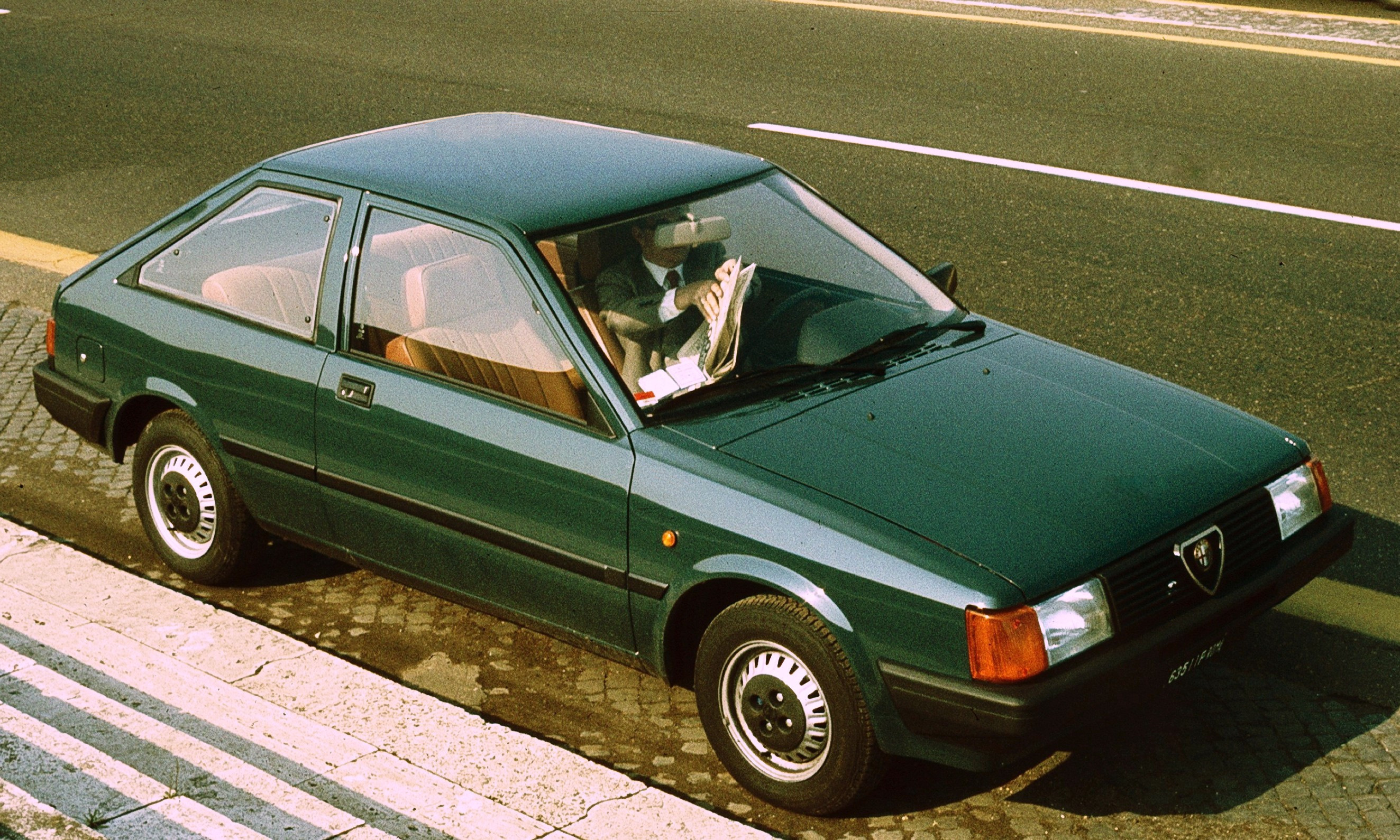
Alfa Romeo Arna

The Alfa Romeo Arna, the product of a joint venture between Alfa Romeo and Nissan, showed promise during development. However, the finished product was merely a rebadged Nissan Cherry hatchback retrofitted with Alfa components and manufactured in Italy. The combination of two sets of problems—the generic styling and poor handling common to Japanese cars of the time, and the poor build quality and reliability that Alfa was known for—was seen as combining the worst qualities of both companies. In an episode of Clarkson's Car Years in 2000, Jeremy Clarkson described the Arna as being a "truly horrific cross-breed" and "one of the worst creations in the whole of history":

It might have worked had they married Japanese build quality with Italian design flair, but they did it the other way around! So what we ended up with was a terribly ugly Nissan Cherry with Alfasud electrics! Can you imagine anything, anything worse?

MSN Autos ranked the Arna first on its list of "Top 10 Disastrous Cars":

A mix of Italian flair and Japanese expertise should have been a match made in heaven, but they clearly decided to divide the tasks by means of a lucky dip. Alfa ended up doing the electronics while Nissan took care of the styling, resulting in an ugly car that didn't work properly.

Car magazine ranked the Arna as one of the worst cars of the past 50 years, writing, "Nissan donated its unlovely Cherry body panels while the Italians lent their exceptionally unexceptional electrical and construction expertise. Result: the most 'bello' Alfa ever." As of March 2018, only three Arnas are known to exist in the United Kingdom, all three of them being covered by Statutory Off Road Notifications (SORNs).

=== Pontiac Fiero (1984–1988) ===
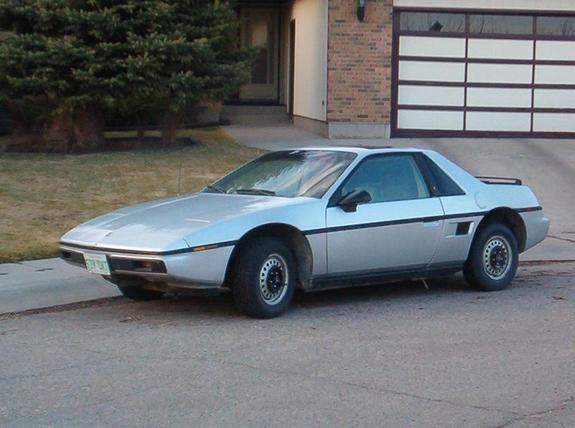
1985 Pontiac Fiero

Introduced for the 1984 model year, the Pontiac Fiero was an immediate hit due to its styling and mid-engined layout. However, the car eventually garnered a negative reputation because of its poor performance, many reliability issues, and a highly publicized recall due to engine fires, in addition to its use of GM's Iron Duke engine. Including the car in Automotive Atrocities, Eric Peters said of the Fiero,

GM's penchant for doing things on the cheap ruined what could have been a great car. The mid-engined Fiero 2M4 looked great and instantly became one of the sensations of the 1984 model year—until people realized those sexy, dent-resistant body panels hid Chevette running gear.

Top Gear writer Richard Porter included the Fiero in Crap Cars, claiming that by basing the Fiero on the Chevette, "Pontiac engineers worked tirelessly to erase whatever excitement [The Fiero's design and layout] might have inspired, chiefly by snuffing out anything that might pass for acceleration."

Edmunds ranked the Fiero as the 58th worst car of all time. In a 2015 retrospective, Road & Track magazine called the Fiero "misunderstood". The magazine noted that the car failed not only because of its poor performance, but also because of the downtrodden image it eventually acquired in American culture; this hampered its long-term reputation by contrast with the similar Toyota MR2:

... the 90s were hard on the poor car. A lot of Fieros were trashed by the mid 90s. The Fiero became a car for divorced 40-year-olds, male or female, who felt they deserved something nice in their lives again. Here was a sporty-looking used car that was more striking than their Mercury Lynx CE14.

=== Yugo (1985–1992) ===
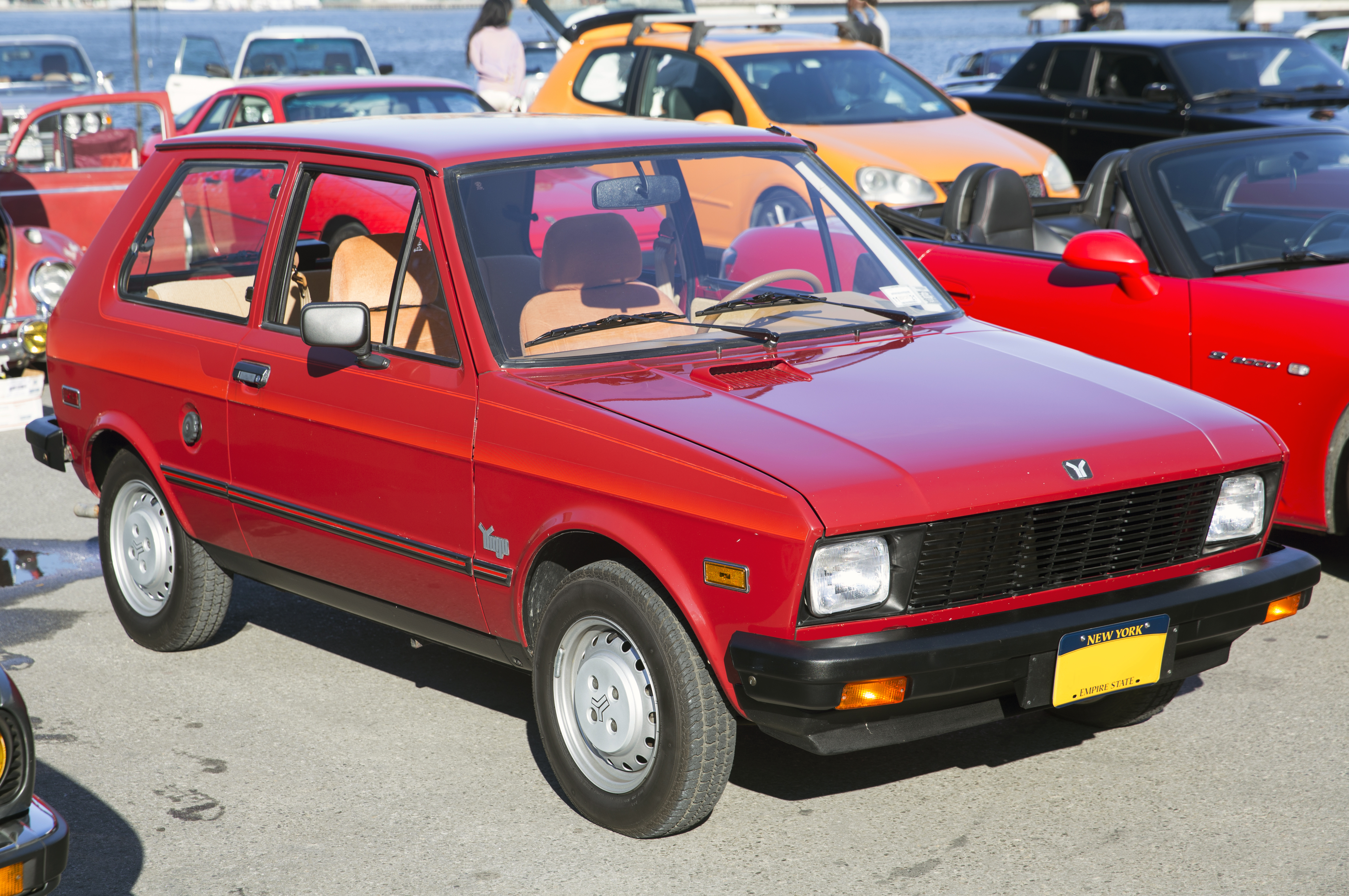
Yugo GV

The Yugo (from Yugoslavia) sold in the United States was roundly criticized for its poor performance, poor build quality, and numerous safety defects, becoming the frequent butt of jokes. The cover of the February 1986 issue of Consumer Reports featured a Yugo being stared down by a Peterbilt truck with the caption "How much car do you get for $3990?" The included review described the car as a "barely assembled bag of nuts and bolts", saying that a used car was a better buy. In 2000, Car Talk voted it the "Worst Car of the Millennium". The Yugo was also included on Time's list of the 50 worst cars of all time and CNN's list of the "10 Most Questionable Cars of All Time". Dan Neil called the Yugo the "Mona Lisa of bad cars", with "the distinct feeling of being assembled at gunpoint." CNN said,

Chinese car companies are now talking about entering the U.S. market, so you'll see the Yugo cited frequently as an example of how not to do it. Lesson number one: There is a definite limit to what Americans will accept in exchange for a low price. The Yugo's reputation for awful build quality—which some dogged defenders still insist was undeserved—quickly became the stuff of legend. Yugo jokes were almost as numerous as lawyer jokes and just as scathing.

In Automotive Atrocities! The Cars We Love to Hate, Eric Peters said that the Yugo was "less reliable than the exchange rate of an African 'people's republic' or a Halliburton financial disclosure", that it "[taught] folks the hard way about getting what you pay for", and that "The Yugo will likely hold in perpetual ignominy the title of 'Worst Car Ever Sold to the American Public'". Jeremy Clarkson drove a Yugo 45 and called it a "hateful, hateful car", describing its performance as so bad "you'll get overtaken by wildlife." Clarkson eventually destroyed the car with a tank. Edmunds ranked the Yugo as the fourth worst car of all time: "A Serbian-made version of the Fiat 127 that couldn't possibly be as awful as its low price suggested. But it was! Currently celebrating its 25th anniversary as shorthand for automotive crap." The story of the car is chronicled in the book The Yugo: The Rise and Fall of the Worst Car in History (2011) by Jason Vuic.

The Yugo brand was launched in the UK in 1981 to compete with the Dacia, FSO, Lada, and Škoda brands at the bottom of the new-car market. The Fiat 128-based Zastava Skala was originally the only model imported into the UK, but the car was joined three years later by the Fiat 127- based version, marketed as the Yugo Tempo. By 1989, an entirely new compact car—styled by Giugiaro and sold as the Yugo Sana—joined the range. The Yugo-badged cars peaked in popularity in Britain during the mid-to-late 1980s. However, the brand could not overcome two challenges: a negative reputation similar to the one it had in the US, and increased competition in the low-cost new-car market from Asian brands such as Daewoo, Hyundai, and Proton. Yugo sales in the UK (along with all other sales to export markets) were halted in 1992 as part of the UN sanctions on Yugoslavia because of wars in the country.

=== General Motors E-Body luxury cars (1986–1993) ===
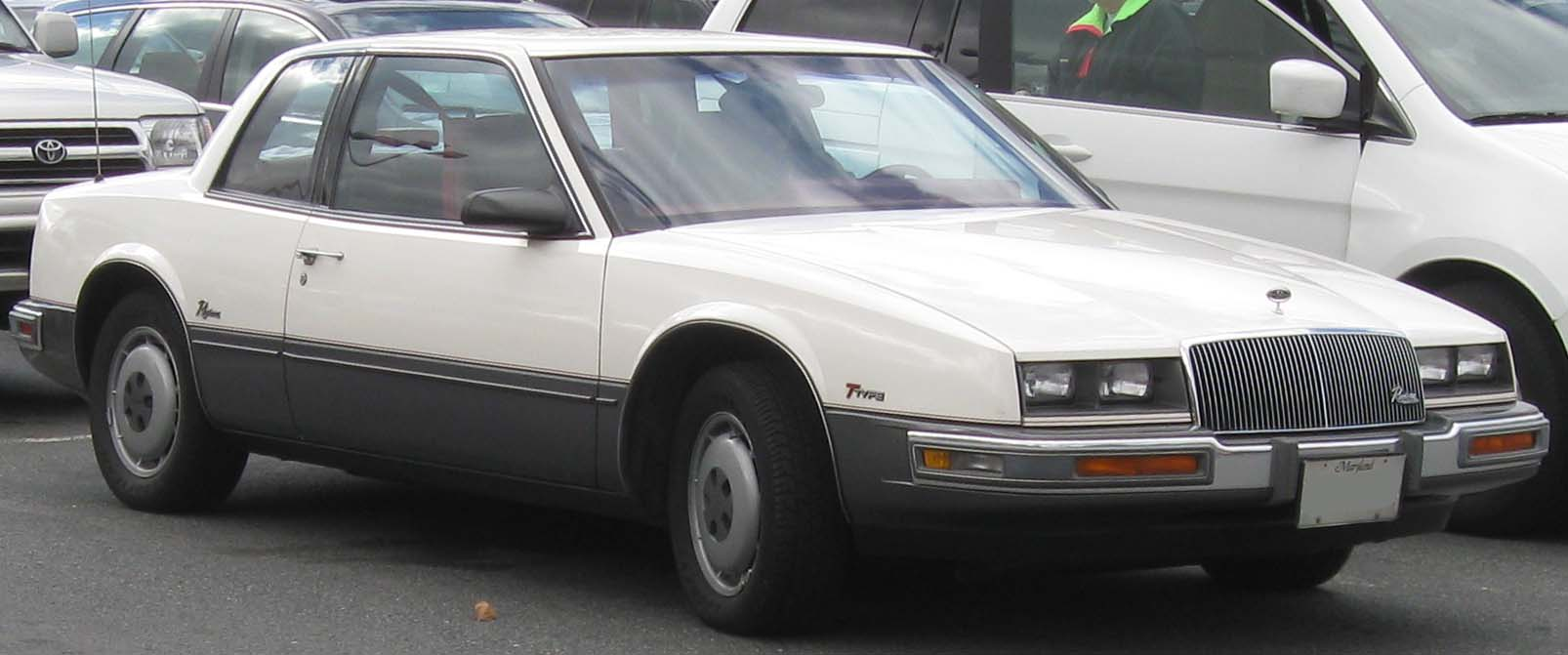
1986 Buick Riviera

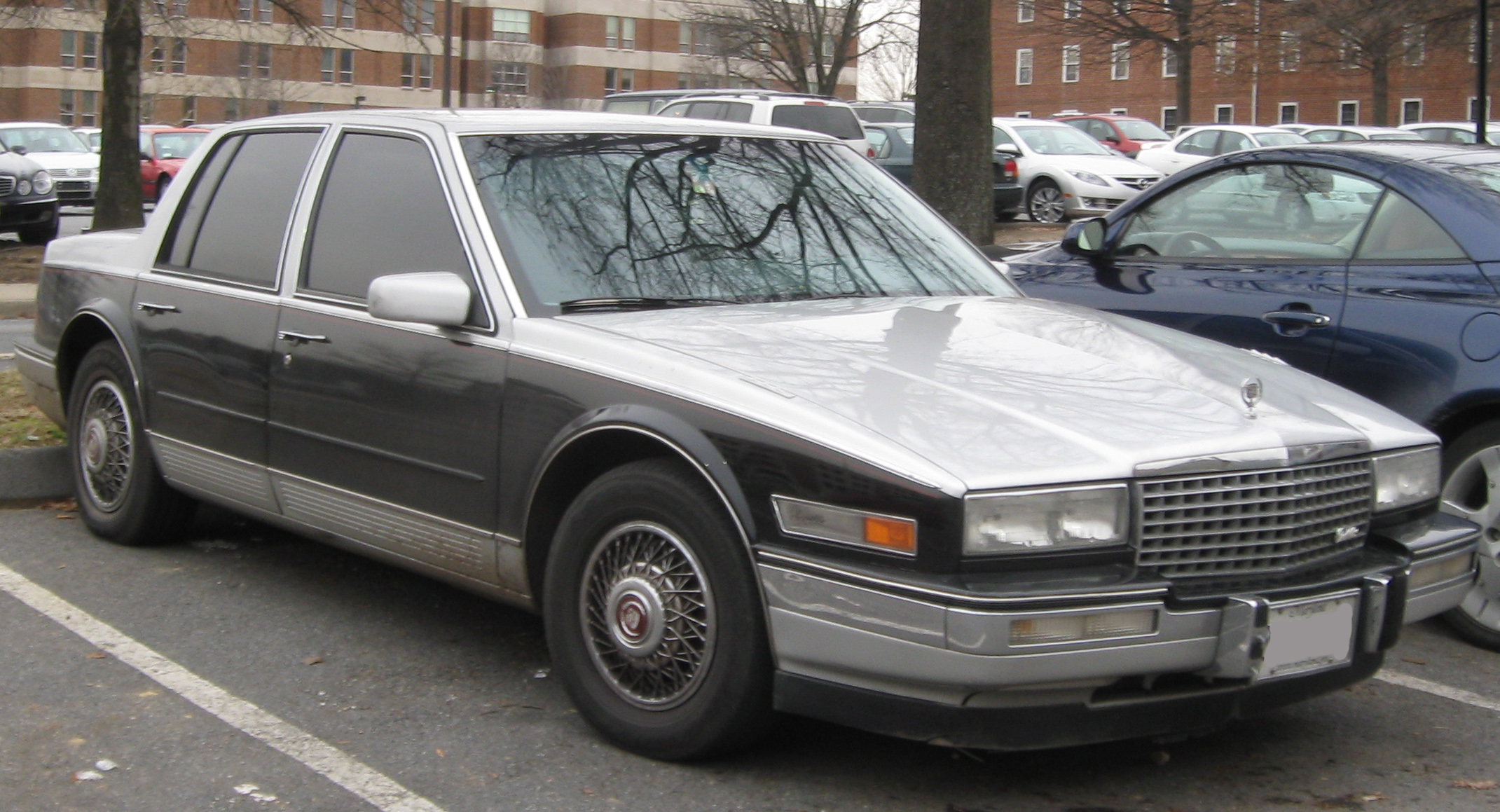
1988 Cadillac Seville

In 1986, General Motors released redesigned, downsized versions of its E-body luxury cars: the Buick Riviera, the Oldsmobile Toronado, the Cadillac Seville and the Cadillac Eldorado. While they were technologically advanced, with the Riviera being the first production car to have a touchscreen computer in the dashboard, these cars were rejected by consumers. Riviera sales halved with the introduction of the new model and dwindled to 8,500 units by 1988, an 87% reduction from 1985, with similar sales drops for the Toronado and the Cadillacs. The Truth About Cars named the 1986 Riviera (and later the 1986 Seville in a separate entry) among the "deadly sins" that led to GM's downfall; the blog struggled to think of another car showing a similar sales drop that was not explained by a recession or an energy crisis:

It wasn't only the loss of sales of these once glorious coupes that was such a mortal blow. It was what these cars once represented: GM as a purveyor of excellent design, desirable image, decent build quality, and a stranglehold on the mid-upper premium market segment. All these were utterly destroyed.

The poor sales of these cars have been attributed to their small size and generic styling, which made them strongly resemble GM's entry-level models:

It wasn't just that the $27k '86 Seville looked too much like an $8k Oldsmobile Calais, which even preceded the Seville by a year. It's also the fact that all these cars just didn't look good, period. [Looking at them] you can't help but wonder what the hell was going on at the once-vaunted GM Design Center.

Popular Mechanics retroactively criticized the Riviera's interior and controls, stating that customers found the computerized dashboard "onerous and distracting". The Oldsmobile Toronado Trofeo is included in the book Automotive Atrocities! The Cars We Love to Hate, with author Eric Peters commenting,

When it appeared in 1966, the front wheel drive Oldsmobile Toronado was a show-stopper—one of those "gotta-have" cars that young men pine for almost as much as cheerleaders. Twenty years later, a miserable pretender appeared, wearing the Toronado name but partaking of none of the old car's glory.

The Toronado was similarly ridiculed by Top Gear writer Richard Porter in Crap Cars.

=== Cadillac Allanté (1987–1993) ===
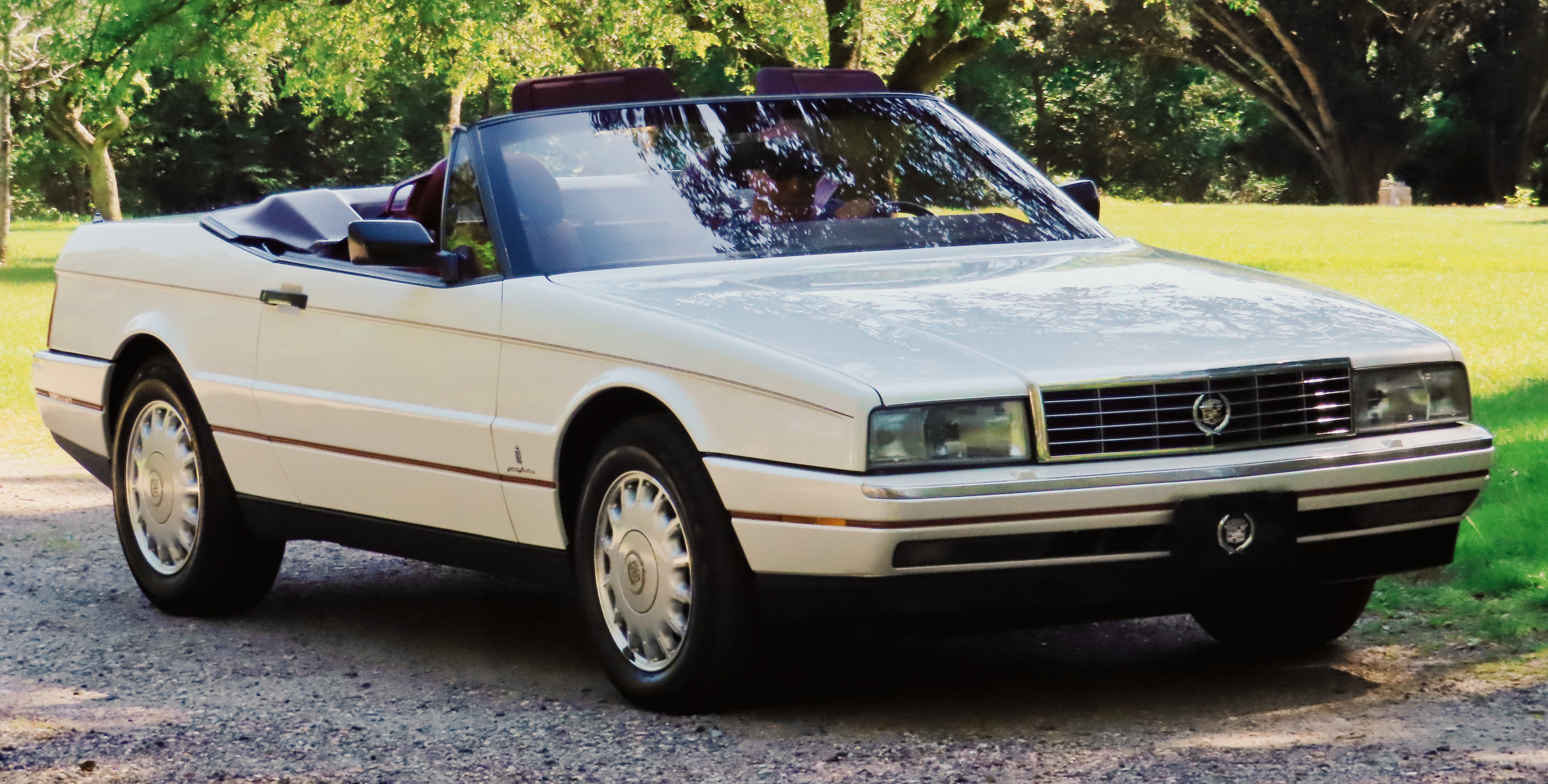
Cadillac Allanté

The Cadillac Allanté, introduced for the 1987 model year, was a top-level convertible intended to compete with the Mercedes-Benz SL. However, the Allanté was a major commercial failure, selling fewer than 5,000 units per year until it was discontinued in 1993. The Allanté was hampered by poor performance—a front-wheel-drive car that was powered by a 170-horsepower engine while weighing 3,600 pounds. Motor Trend measured the Allanté as having a 0–60 time of 10.3 seconds, 4 seconds slower than the Mercedes. This measurement led the press to dismiss the Allanté as "all show, no go". The Allanté was also beset by numerous quality issues, most notably a leaky convertible top—an issue that GM was found to have known about but ignored before the car's launch—and expensive problems with its Bosch anti-lock brakes. Although GM fixed the Allanté's flaws throughout its production run, the combination of its early quality problems, a redesigned Mercedes-Benz SL launched in 1989, and the early 1990s recession (which depressed luxury car sales) led to the car's failure. Including the Allanté in Automotive Atrocities: The Cars We Love to Hate, Eric Peters lamented that the Allanté "coulda been a contender"; "What turned this magic coach into a pumpkin was the car's dreadful initial quality, exorbitant price, and the less-than-world-class performance." In a retrospective article, CarThrottle wrote that "The Cadillac Allanté is considered a poster child of what's wrong with GM."

Describing the Allanté as "wildly overpriced, bland and sloppy handling" that "hit the market with a thud", Curbside Classic wrote of it,

If ever there was a metaphor for GM's deaf, dumb and blind market comprehension, this was it. The fact that the Allanté had to be designed and partially assembled in Europe spoke loud and clear that the solons in corporate HQ had lost touch with their target buyer (and economic reality). Even with its towering $54,000 sticker price, buyers got leaky roofs, troublesome Northstar engines and sluggish acceleration. To beat it all, GM lost money on every Allanté ever made.

Edmunds named the Allanté the 23rd worst car of all time, describing it as "pointless" and an "embarrassing attempt to take on the Mercedes SL".

=== Sterling 825/827 (1987–1991) ===
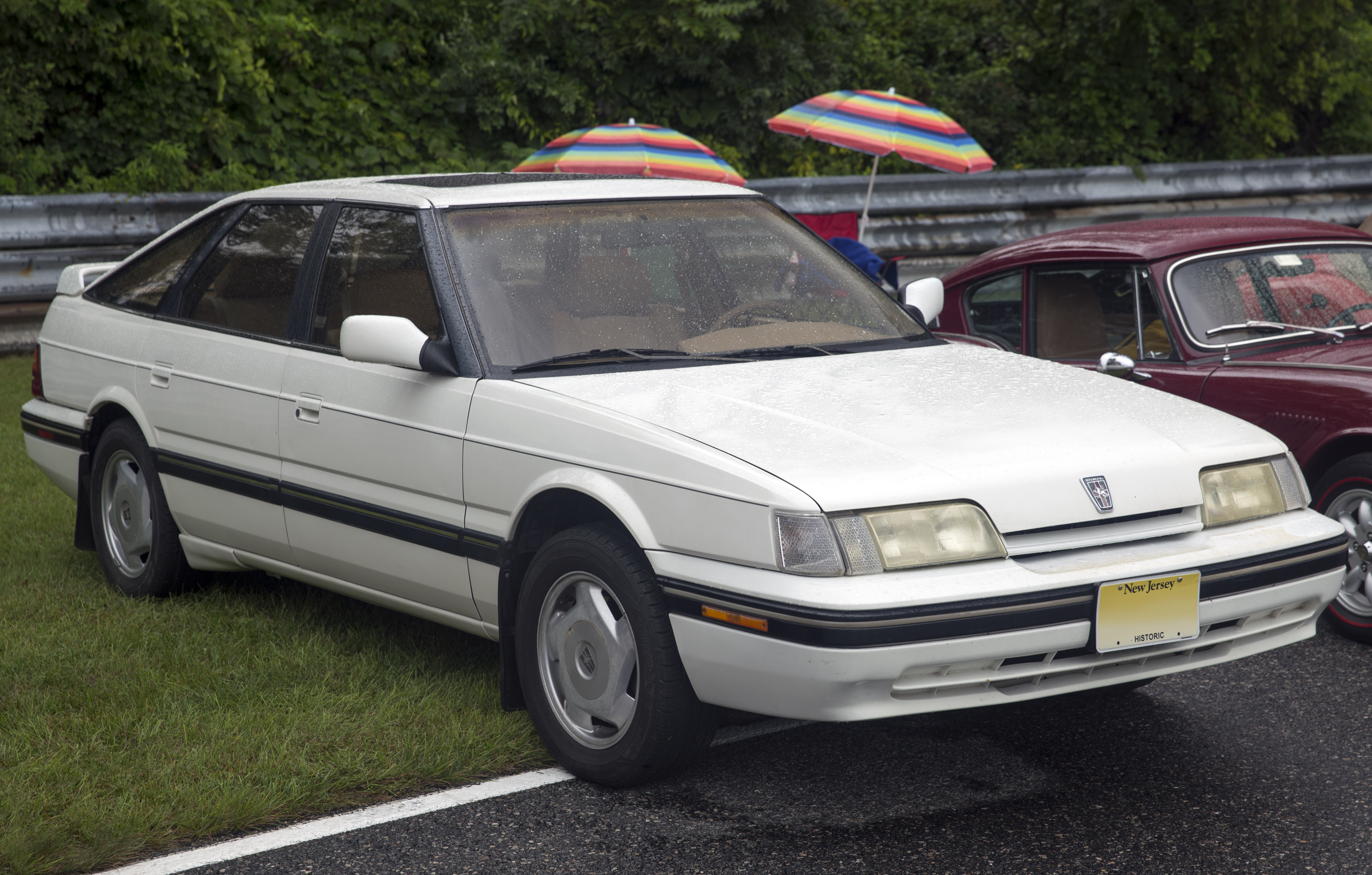
1989 Sterling 827

The Sterling 825 was a lightly modified Rover 800 created for export to the United States. The 800, in turn, was jointly developed with Honda; the car was very similar in design to, and shared most of its mechanical components with, the Acura Legend. The Sterling, suffering from many build quality and reliability problems, ended up a major commercial failure, in sharp contrast with the success of the concurrently launched Acura. Naming it one of the worst failures of the past 25 years, Car and Driver retroactively wrote of the car,

... on paper, it made sense: Take a Rover 800—which was really just a rebodied Acura Legend—rebadge it, and sell it through a network of independent dealers under a new, made-up brand. Japanese reliability, British interior ambiance, and a lack of preconceived notions? How could you lose? Quite easily, as it turned out. Predictably, the problem lay in the car itself—the first Sterlings were nothing short of unreliable, hastily screwed-together nightmares. (Apparently, Japanese engineering doesn't work if you assemble it with equal parts wood glue and indifference. Who knew?)

The online magazine Jalopnik named the Sterling 825 one of the dumbest cars ever imported to the United States, saying to "think of it as a classy but terrible Acura." Autotrader retroactively wrote of the Sterling,

The Rover 825 came to the U.S. in 1987 under the Sterling brand name. Initially, U.S. buyers were intrigued—remember, this was at the height of Reagan-Thatcher cooperation and just a few years after Prince Charles and Princess Di got hitched. The UK was cool in the U.S., and buyers were enticed by the wood-trimmed dash, the leather-lined seats and the slick fastback body not offered on the U.S.-market Acura Legend. Besides, the engine and the mechanical bits were from Honda. How bad could it be? Plainly put, what passed for decent build quality in Britain was pathetic in the U.S. And so it went with the Sterling 825. Trim fell off. Electricals failed. The paintwork was terrible. And after a few short years, the car started to rust. Contemporary J.D. Power surveys told the story: The Sterling was near the bottom, while the Acura Legend was near the top. One of the unique selling points of the Sterling, by the way, was the Sterling Plus Motor Club, which offered hotel accommodations for stranded owners—one marvels that Rover didn't go bankrupt from the lodging bills.

Autotrader also noted that despite the Sterling's failure, the same export initiative also brought the Land Rover to the United States.

Including the car in Automotive Atrocities: The Cars We Love to Hate, Eric Peters noted the Sterling's shared development with the Acura Legend and wrote of it,

While Acura would go on to great things, the half-breed spawn of this odd one-night stand would go down as one of the greatest commercial flops ever. Given Acura's 'Sterling' reputation today as a manufacturer of first-class luxury cars—and the well-known success of the Legend in the United States—it's hard to understand why the essentially similar Sterling 825 and 827 went belly-up so quickly. [Buyers] quickly encountered defeating problems such as dashboards that turned a hideous green in the sunlight and other fit, finish and build quality issues related to the car's chintzy British-sourced [cosmetic pieces].

Including the Sterling 825 in his book Crap Cars, Richard Porter wrote of it,

It seemed like such a good idea. Rover of Britain and Honda of Japan would join forces to make a luxury car. The Japanese would bring the build quality, reliability and precision engineering. The British would garnish it with their talent for suspension tuning and tasteful design. What could possibly go wrong? For Acura, nothing. For Sterling? Absolutely everything. The only bit of the Sterling that was even remotely dependable was the engine. And—surprise, surprise—that came from Honda.

Edmunds ranked the Sterling 825 as the 68th worst car of all time.

The UK version of the car, sold as the Rover 800 Series, was initially popular after its 1986 launch. The car was restyled in 1991, although its popularity was already declining when it was discontinued at the start of 1999, to be replaced by the Rover 75.

=== Eagle Premier (1988–1992) ===
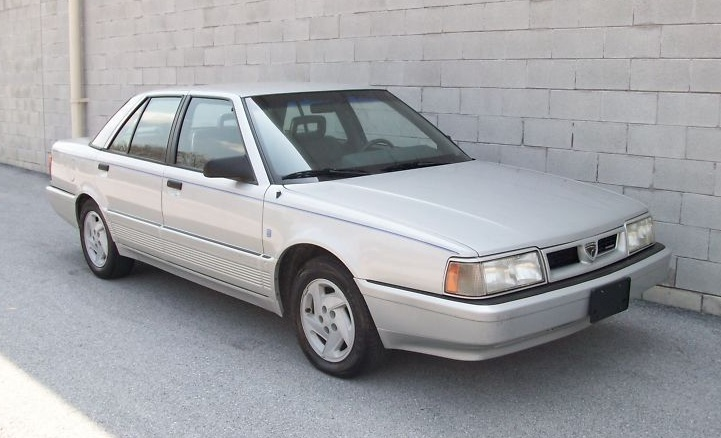
1992 Eagle Premier

The Eagle Premier—also sold as the Dodge Monaco—was a large sedan developed as a joint venture between American Motors and Renault, launched after AMC was bought out by Chrysler. Chrysler established a new brand, Eagle, to market the car. While a commercial failure, the Premier formed the basis of the company's successful LH platform cars: the 1993 Dodge Intrepid, the Chrysler Concorde, and the Eagle Vision. Calling it one of the dumbest cars ever imported to the United States, Jalopnik said that the car was "developed at the final moments of AMC's Renault clusterfuck before Chrysler took over. It's quite a story (seriously, it's even got a high-level Cold War assassination)!"

Autoweek magazine retroactively wrote of the car,

The Premier ultimately fell victim to poor timing—AMC started to unravel just as the sedan entered production. Chrysler would inherit most of AMC, and the very first Premiers left the factory with a mishmash of Renault and Eagle badges attached to various surfaces. The Premier suffered from an identity crisis from the start, and by the time it was suddenly rebadged as an Eagle—an all-new brand created out of thin air for AMC leftovers—and then as a Dodge, consumers weren't really sure what they were buying.

Autoweek also noted that the only place to find a Premier today was at a junkyard; because of the car's poor reliability and the difficulty in finding a shop that could service it, the Premier "disappeared pretty quickly" off American roads. Edmunds ranked the Premier as the 98th worst car of all time, describing it as a "boring box built around the Renault 25 chassis". TheStreet ranked the Premier the worst car of all time, noting its complete lack of redeeming qualities:

You may look at this car and think to yourself, 'that's not that bad.' But what it is that makes this car particularly terrible, it's what it is not. When you get into this car, you feel nothing. There is nothing special or unique about the Eagle Premier. This car looks like the generic silhouette of a vehicle in which you would spot only on a 25-year old poster that has been hanging in tired DMV, generic and apathetic in nature, faded and defeated from years of exposure to florescent [sic] lighting and the restless complaints of impatient souls. It is a symbol of sheer indifference and nothingness.

=== Chrysler TC by Maserati (1989–1991) ===
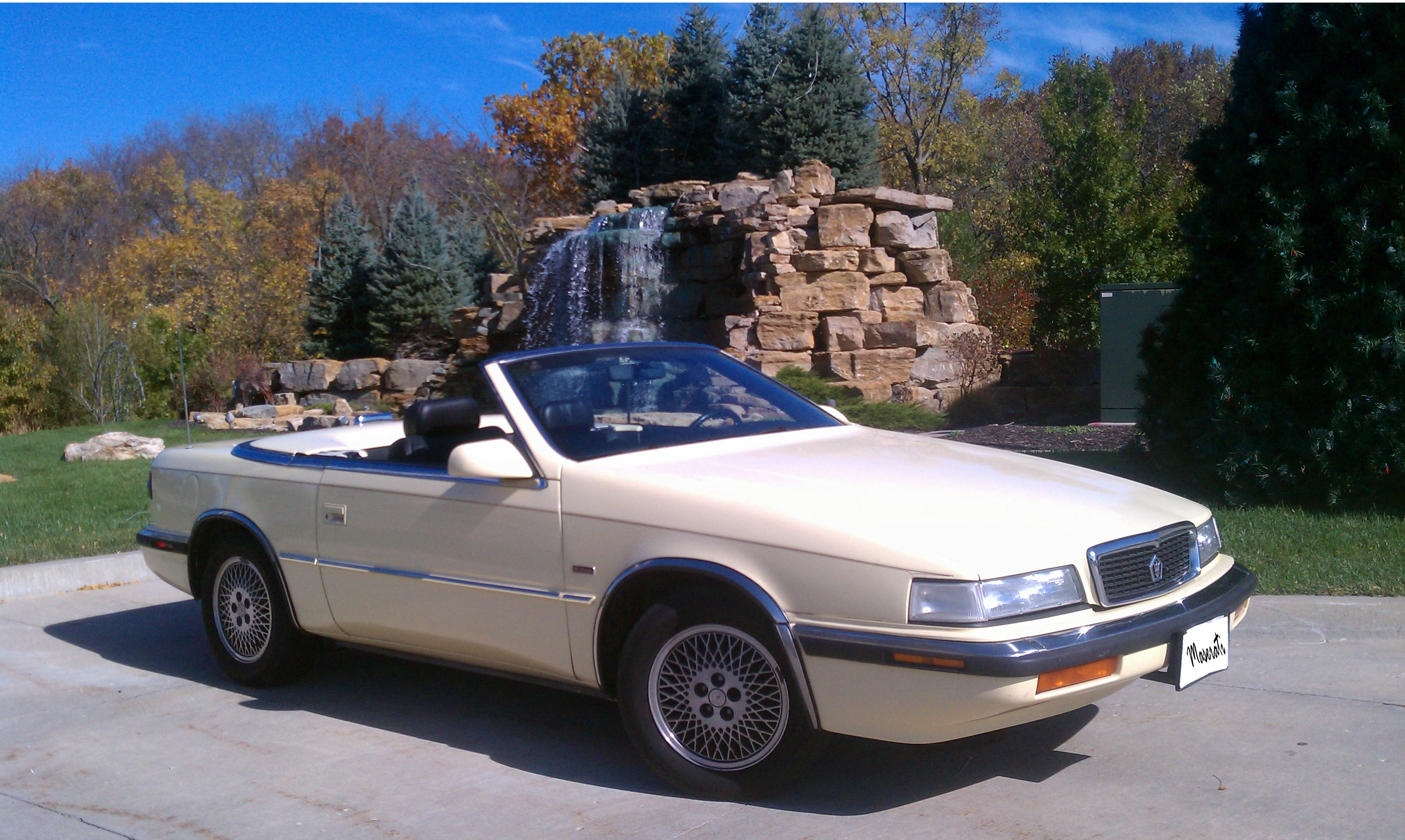
1990 Chrysler TC by Maserati

The Chrysler TC by Maserati was introduced in 1989 after years of production delays; it was the result of a deal between Chrysler CEO Lee Iacocca and his friend, Maserati's head Alejandro de Tomaso, to create a top-line sports car for Chrysler. The resulting vehicle was a commercial and critical failure: it was based on K-car components, strongly resembled the much lower-priced Chrysler LeBaron convertible, and was only marginally more capable than the LeBaron. Including the car on its list of "The Greatest Automotive Flops of the Past 25 Years", Car and Driver said of it,

Arrogance, thy name is Lee Iacocca. In the late 1980s, the Chrysler chairman and perpetual huckster turned a friendship with Alejandro de Tomaso, then president of Maserati, into the most shudder-worthy example of corporate avarice ever to roll off an assembly line. Chrysler's TC by Maserati was little more than a Milan-built K-car with a few pricey underhood components and some styling hackery, a wrinkly grandmother dressed up in custom running shoes and ill-fitting hot pants. The Maserati trident plastered on the grille just added insult to injury.

Including the car in the Automotive Atrocities: The Cars We Love to Hate, Eric Peters wrote of it,

If you slipped a wino into a pair of Bruno Magli shoes, not many people would believe he was actually Pierce Brosnan out for an incognito stroll. Yet Chrysler Corp. thought that a similar quickie Italian makeover would work wonders for its K-car-based, front-wheel-drive LeBaron coupe. [Expecting a buyer to pay significantly extra for the TC over a LeBaron] was like expecting people to pay $20 for a Quarter Pounder with cheese if it was called a Royale with cheese and served on a china plate instead of purveyed to you wrapped in greasy paper.

Peters also noted that the TC is the only Maserati car to have no collectible value. The TC was featured in Crap Cars, in which Richard Porter wrote of it, "Best of all was an advertisement for the TC that claimed that this crock was 'built and handcrafted'. Built and handcrafted? So they bolted it all together, and then added the handcrafted bits?" Edmunds ranked it as the 15th worst car ever made: "Stupid combination of front-drive K-Car bits, indifferent Maserati assembly in Italy and a two-seat roadster body that was indistinguishable from a LeBaron. It's both the worst Maserati and worst Chrysler ever." Dan Neil described the TC as being "a flaccid, front-drive, four-cylinder loser-mobile with the proud Mazzer Trident on the nose".

== 1990s ==
=== Ford Escort MK V (European version) (1990–1992) ===
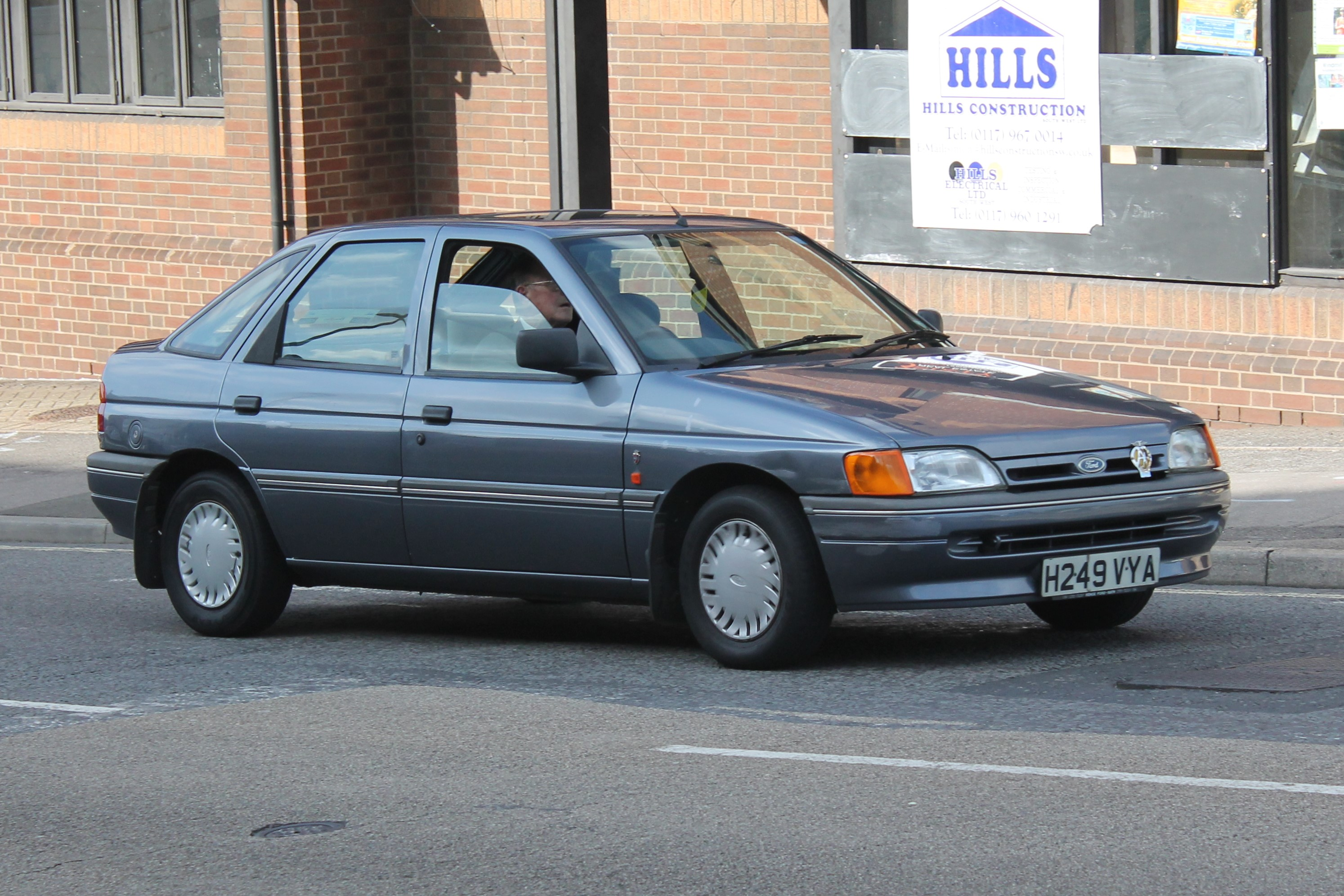
Ford Escort

In 1990, Ford of Europe launched the fifth generation of the Ford Escort, which had consistently been the best-selling car in markets (including the United Kingdom) during the 1980s and was thus desired by the public. However, the new Escort was widely considered a major disappointment when it went on sale in September 1990. The car was criticized for using carried-over ageing and low-performance engines from the previous Escorts despite its new body; the car was also criticized for its disappointing ride and handling, bland styling, and failing to improve on its predecessor. Top Gear's Jeremy Clarkson called the Escort's steering a "joke", while Autocar magazine headlined a comparison as "Escort Meets Its Rivals And Loses".

The car's bad press reception led Ford to undertake an emergency facelift, with the updated model going on sale in September 1992, much improved, with new 16-valve fuel-injected Zetec engines. This improvement helped improve the car's poor image, although the car still failed to become as successful as hoped. Despite its bad reception, the car sold well in Europe, especially the UK; this was mostly due to the car's competitive pricing, which was the only real advantage it had over acclaimed rivals including the Citroën ZX, the Rover 200 Series, the Vauxhall/Opel Astra and the MK3 Volkswagen Golf. In 2015, the British website Driving put the car on its list of the 10 "worst production cars of all time". The Escort was updated again at the beginning of 1995, and it remained in production until 2000, two years after the launch of its successor, the Focus.

=== General Motors U-platform minivan (1990–1996) ===
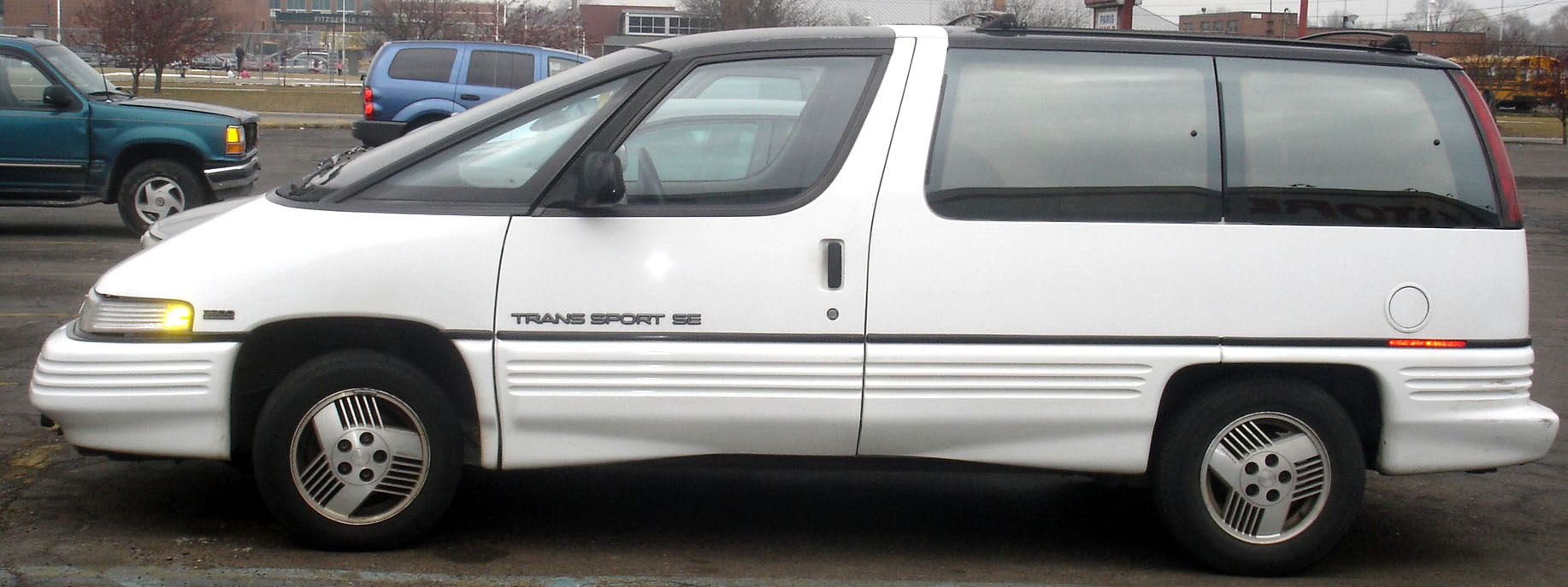
An early Pontiac Trans Sport, whose side view may explain why the van was commonly nicknamed the "Dustbuster".

The General Motors U-platform minivan—sold as the Chevrolet Lumina APV, the Pontiac Trans Sport, and the Oldsmobile Silhouette—was introduced in the 1990 model year to provide a stylish alternative to the Dodge Caravan. However, the minivan was strongly criticized for its awkward driving position and strange styling. The first generation of U-body vans quickly gained the derisive nickname "Dustbusters" from press and public alike, because of their resemblance to a popular handheld vacuum cleaner with the same name. In Crap Cars, Richard Porter describes the van as "an enormous Dustbuster with detailing work by a group of lightly trained monkeys".

CNBC included the Trans Sport on its list of the "10 Ugliest Cars of All Time". Curbside Classic named the Lumina APV as one of the "deadly sins" that led to GM's downfall:

There are two primary reasons GM vehicles have failed. They either arrived with deadly flaws in their quality/reliability, like the Vega, Citation and quite a few other models. Or they were conceived in GM's notorious bubble of hubris, where its product planners and designers were seemingly perpetually stuck in a Jetsons-Futurama mind set, convinced that they could wow Americans with more advanced design and technology. What Americans really want is a minivan that looks like a space shuttle! Not. The most obvious feature of these vans are their extremely long noses, the huge low-slope windshield, and the set-back front seats. The combination of the three created a very distinctive visual effect from the outside that caused them almost instantly to be dubbed 'Dustbusters'. The effect from the front seats was also disconcerting, as there was a ledge in front of the dashboard that seemed to go on for eternity, creating the feeling of sitting in the second row of more typical minivan. It would have made a nice platform for a bed if these were autonomous.

Edmunds, describing the van as "stupid-looking", ranked it the 86th worst car of all time. The van was parodied in a 1997 episode of the American TV series The Simpsons and in the 1995 film Get Shorty. The Trans Sport proved popular in Europe, particularly France, because its styling and layout were similar to the contemporary Renault Espace.

=== Vector W8 (1990–1993) ===
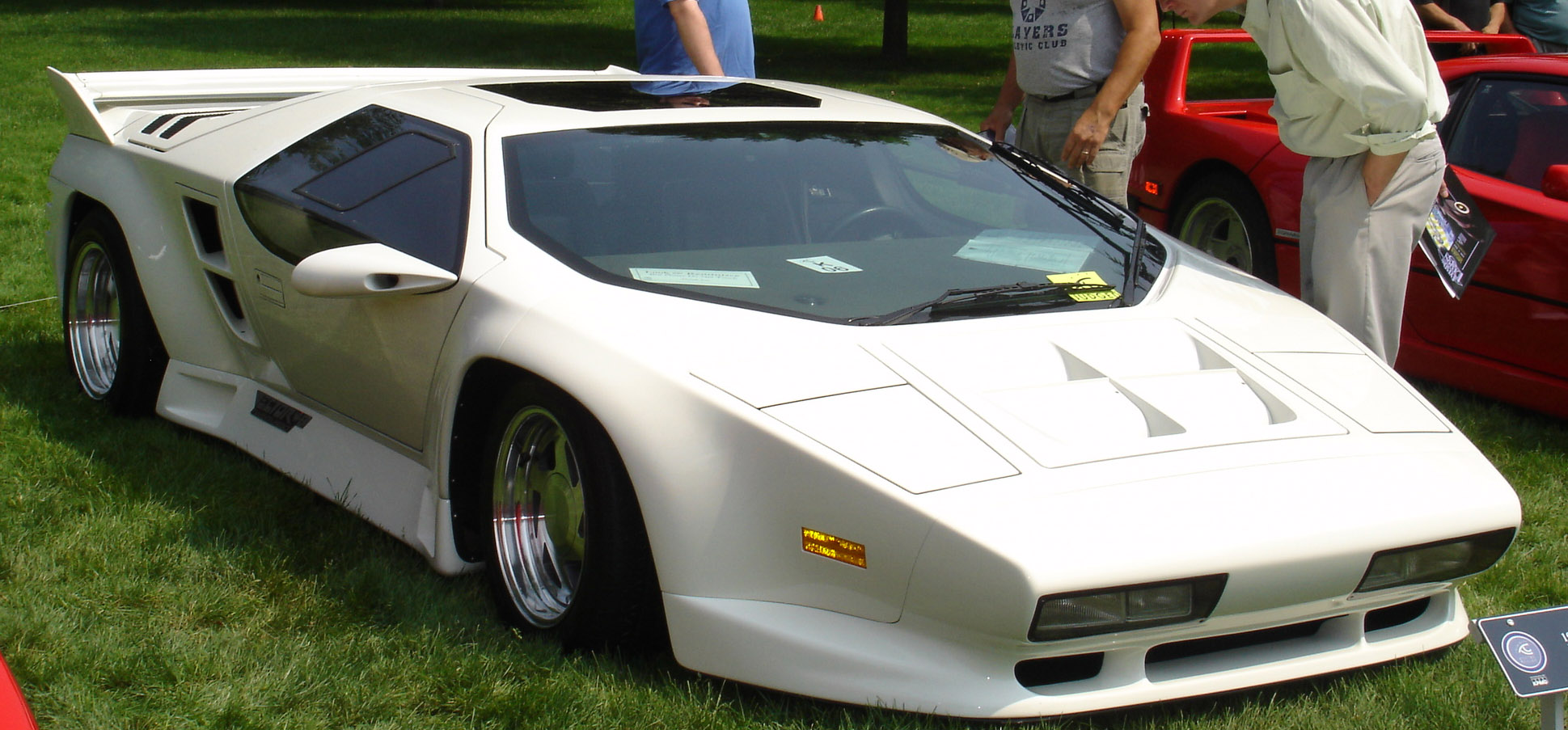
Vector W8

The Vector W8 was a supercar built by American manufacturer Vector Motors. Developed through the 1980s and promoted with its Vector W2 prototype, the W8 was delayed numerous times and did not go into production until 1990. Only 17 vehicles were completed before the company collapsed. The car received negative publicity almost immediately after one of the first models, purchased by tennis star Andre Agassi, nearly caught fire the first time that he drove it. Agassi described the car as a "death trap"; he went to Vector's founder and CEO, Gerald Wiegert, returned the car, and demanded a refund, which Wiegert provided. Car and Driver attempted a road test of the W8 in 1991, but all three production models that had been supplied broke down in different ways during testing.

In a 2017 article, Car and Driver described the W8 as "vaporware"; apologized for the positive publicity that the publication had given Vector during the 1980s; and claimed that the car is the reason why the publication never accepts a manufacturer's claims about a new model without testing it directly. Jalopnik included the W8 on its list of "Ten Totally Bogus 90s cars", saying, "When they were running, they may have been great cars, but the W8 was a combination of 80s style with 70s quality, making it the most backward sports car of a forward-looking decade." Edmunds named the W8 the 93rd worst car of all time: "Gerald Wiegert's 625-horsepower, $400,000-plus folly was obsolete by the time it finally hit production. Only 17 reached customers—and they needed to be shadowed by a flatbed."

=== Ford Scorpio (1994–1998) ===
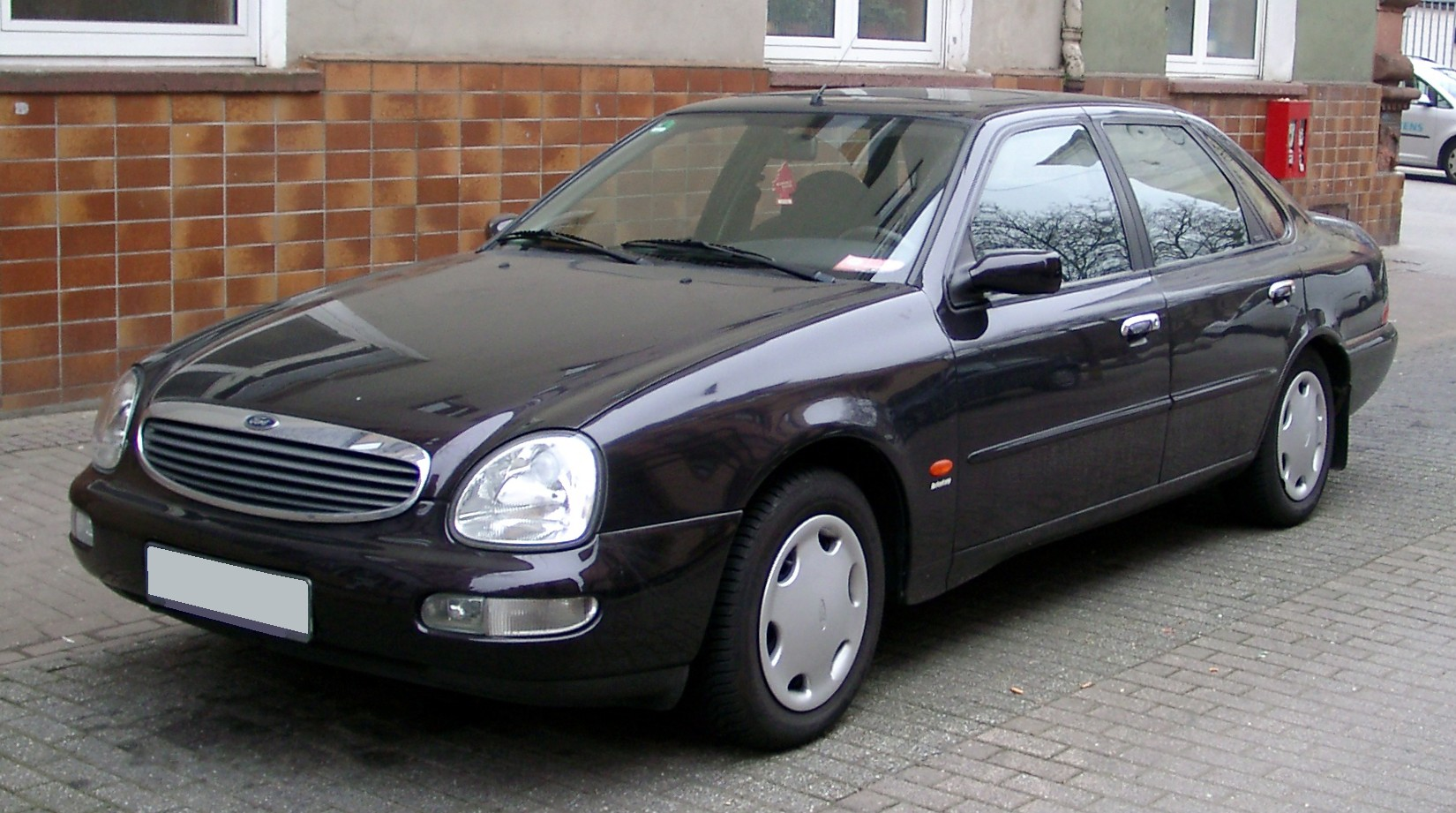
Ford Scorpio

The second generation of the Ford Scorpio executive car made by Ford Germany was positively received for its luxury interior, handling and performance; however, the public's and the press's reactions to its unconventional styling, especially the "frog-eye" front, were largely negative, which made it a sales failure. After only four years, the car was discontinued without a successor, making Ford Europe withdraw from the executive car market. Jeremy Clarkson said of the Scorpio:

In many ways the Scorpio wasn't a bad car. It was well made, it was extremely well equipped, and considering its size, it was good value for money. But, for some reason, it went on sale with a face of such unparalleled awfulness, that very few people ever actually bought one. Why would you? Why would anybody deliberately buy a car that they knew would make their children cry? We've had cars styled to look like jaguars and sharks in the past, but never, until this came along, had one ever been styled to look like a frog... but with its gormless mouth and its stupid headlights, this was a first. If you were going to run a competition to find the world's ugliest car, this would probably win it. So it's not a good looking car...

Moreover, Clarkson said that "There's no escaping that loopy face, a face that its parents don't seem to like either" and described it as a "gopping hideous monstrosity". The British website Retro Motor called it "gargoyle-ugly" and said that

... the Scorpio resembled something that David Attenborough might reveal from a dank cave in Borneo. The front end was particularly troubling, your eyes irresistibly drawn to it before your brain fought over whether to focus upon the globular triangles of its headlights, or the reptilian gurn of its grille. With a face like this, the new Scorpio's oddly fat flanks were easy to pass over until you arrived at a plump rear end that resembled a giant cushion.

The Scorpio is often considered one of the worst and ugliest cars ever built, with The Times newspaper calling it "the ugliest manmade vehicle of all time". Driving ranked the car 14th on its list of the 23 ugliest cars ever made; Auto Express ranked it fifth on its list of the ten ugliest cars ever made; and Drive.com.au included it in an article on the worst cars of the 20th century, calling it "one of the silliest-looking cars of the century".

=== Suzuki X-90 (1995–1997) ===
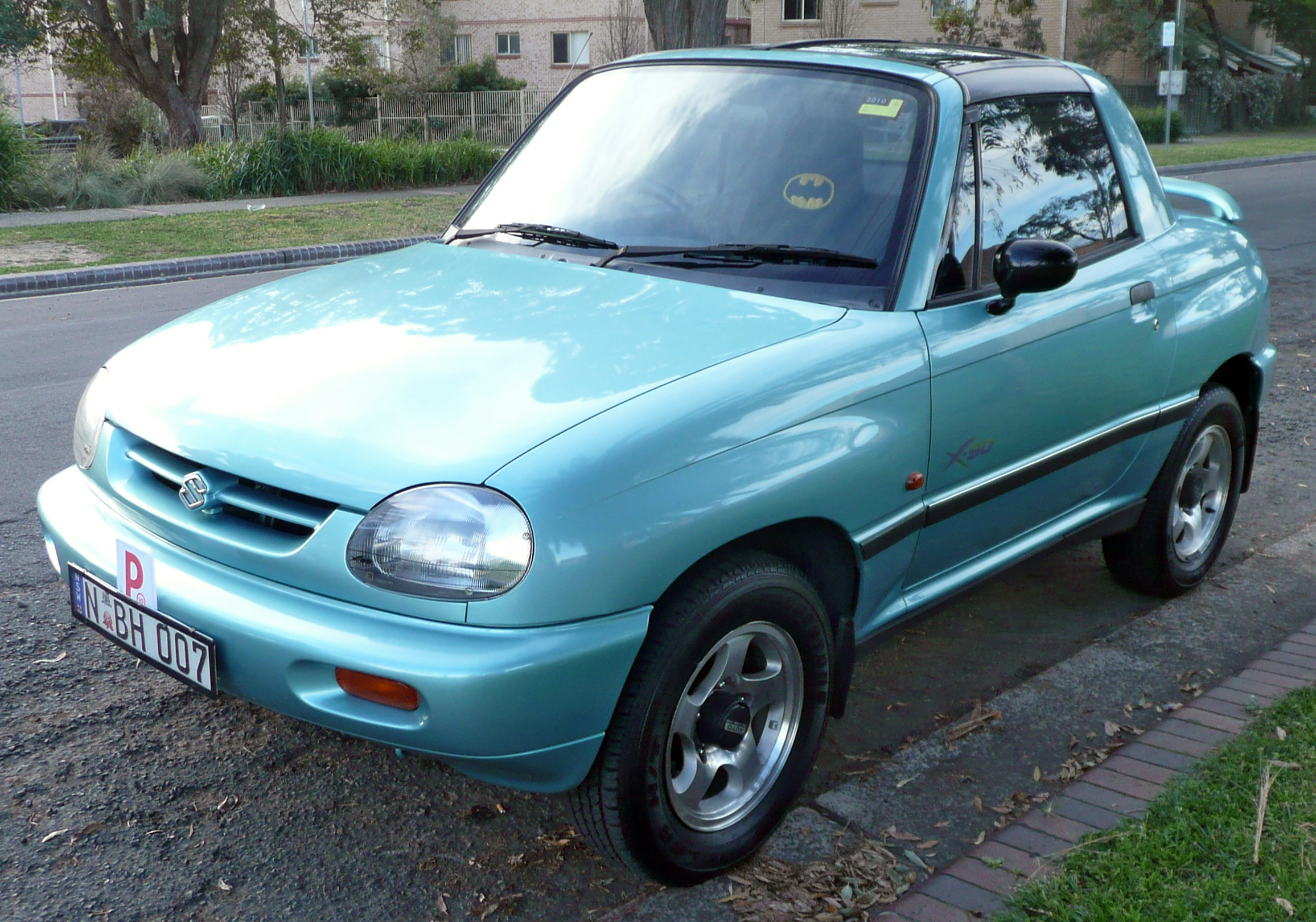
Suzuki X-90

The Suzuki X-90 was a small sport utility vehicle (SUV) based on the popular Sidekick/Vitara. The X-90 was a crossover between an SUV, a roadster, and a buggy (with a T-top roof), and it replaced the Samurai in the US market. The X-90 was intended to be an enjoyable two-seat leisure car, but it was heavily criticized for its sparse interior space, small trunk, poor performance, bad road handling, lack of driving enjoyment, and controversial styling. The car was also priced higher than the Sidekick, which featured four seats, more interior room, and a bigger trunk. The X-90 was featured in the books The Worst Cars Ever Sold by Giles Chapman, Crap Cars by Richard Porter, and Naff Motors: 101 Automotive Lemons by Tony Davis.

In October 2013, Top Gear magazine ranked the X-90 10th on its list of "The 13 worst cars of the last 20 years", saying, "Evil progenitor of the pre-TOWIE Essexmobile, the Vitara SUV, the X-90 compounded Suzuki's reputation for marketing-led myopia and wobbly handling." TheStreet ranked the car 15th in its list of the 20 Worst Cars of All Time, saying,

After looking at this car, it may not be a surprise to anyone that Suzuki no longer produces cars in the U.S. Not only does the car look near exactly the same going forward as it does going backward, it is almost as if the manufacturers simply forgot the middle part of the car.

The Telegraph newspaper ranked the car seventh in its list of the "10 worst cars ever sold in Britain", commenting, "Who wanted a two-seater convertible mini-SUV? Nobody, especially when it had awful handling and zero off-road ability." Stuff included in an article on Cars that should never have been built, saying, "Suzuki did wonders with the X90 by redesigning the early Vitara to look like a back-scrubbing shower accessory, on the way halving its passenger capacity and turning an excellent new junior 4x4 into a blobby, saleproof nightmare."

=== Vector M12 (1996–1998) ===
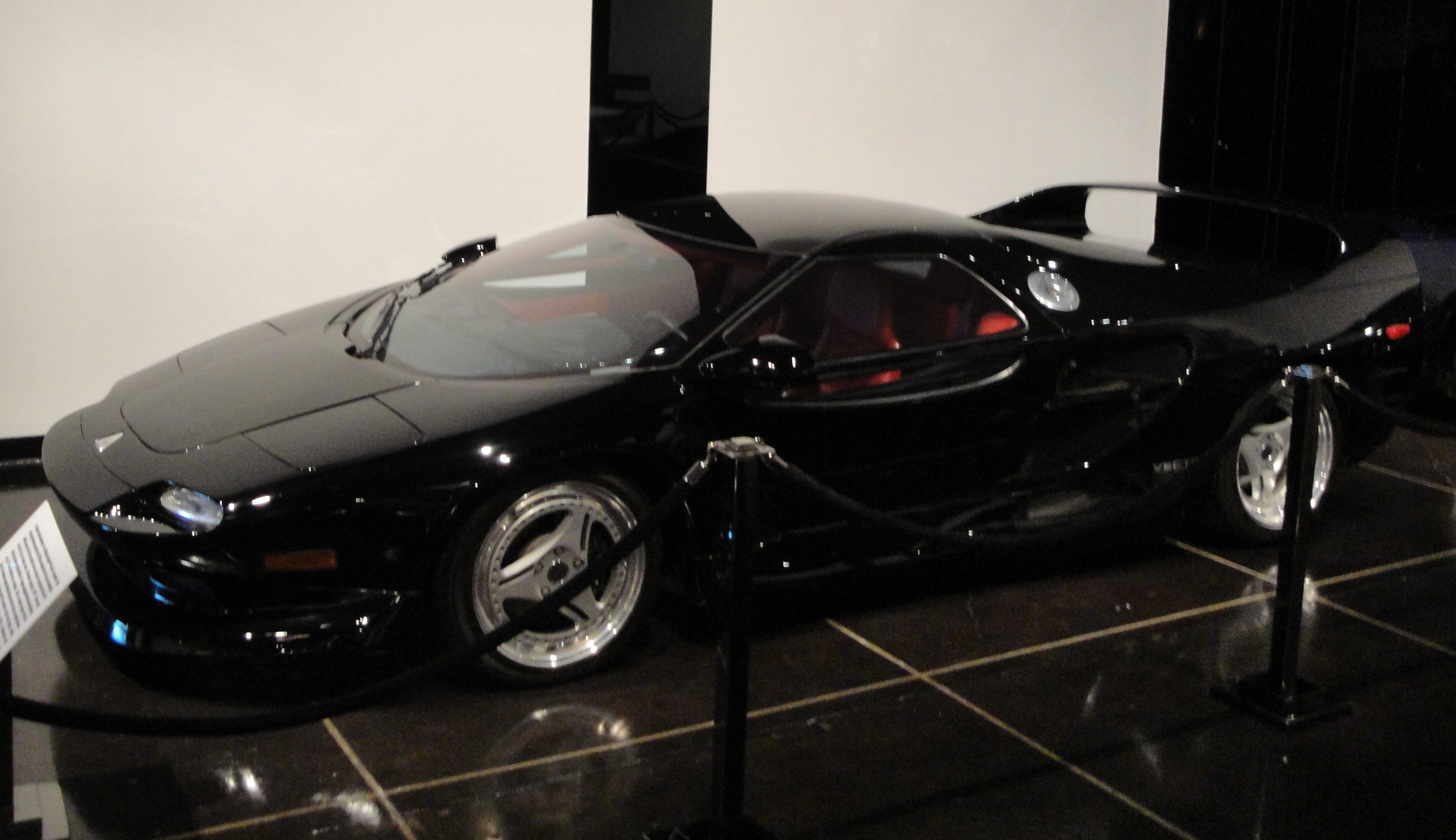
Vector M12

The Vector M12 was a repurposed Vector WX3 prototype, manufactured after the company's hostile takeover by Indonesian company Megatech. A number of the car's mechanical parts, including its V12 engine, were borrowed from the Lamborghini Diablo. In a period review for Top Gear, Jeremy Clarkson gave the M12 a negative mark, claiming that it "was cooked by a man who learned everything there is to know about quality control in a Bulgarian power station." Clarkson noted that the air conditioning system did not work properly; the driver's door did not fit; one of the heating, ventilation, and air conditioning (HVAC) vents could be pushed into the dashboard; and he could smell gasoline inside the car. While noting that the M12 could be enjoyable to drive around a track, he judged it not worth buying.

Autoweek deemed the M12 the worst vehicle that the publication had ever tested. Vector entered the M12 in auto races to establish brand equity, but the car received additional negative publicity; due to engine failure, the M12 never completed a single race. Only 17 vehicles were built before Vector went into receivership because it could not afford to pay Lamborghini to ship more engines. In a retrospective article, CarThrottle described the M12 as a "botch job" and noted, "would-be customers found it hard to justify spending $189,000 on a canoe-bodied car that was slower, uglier and of lesser build-quality than [the Lamborghini Diablo]." MSN Autos included the M12 on its list of "The World's Worst Supercars". Despite the car's negative reputation, it was included as a purchasable vehicle, along with the Vector W8, in the video game Gran Turismo 2, for 1 million credits.

=== Cadillac Catera (1997–2001) ===
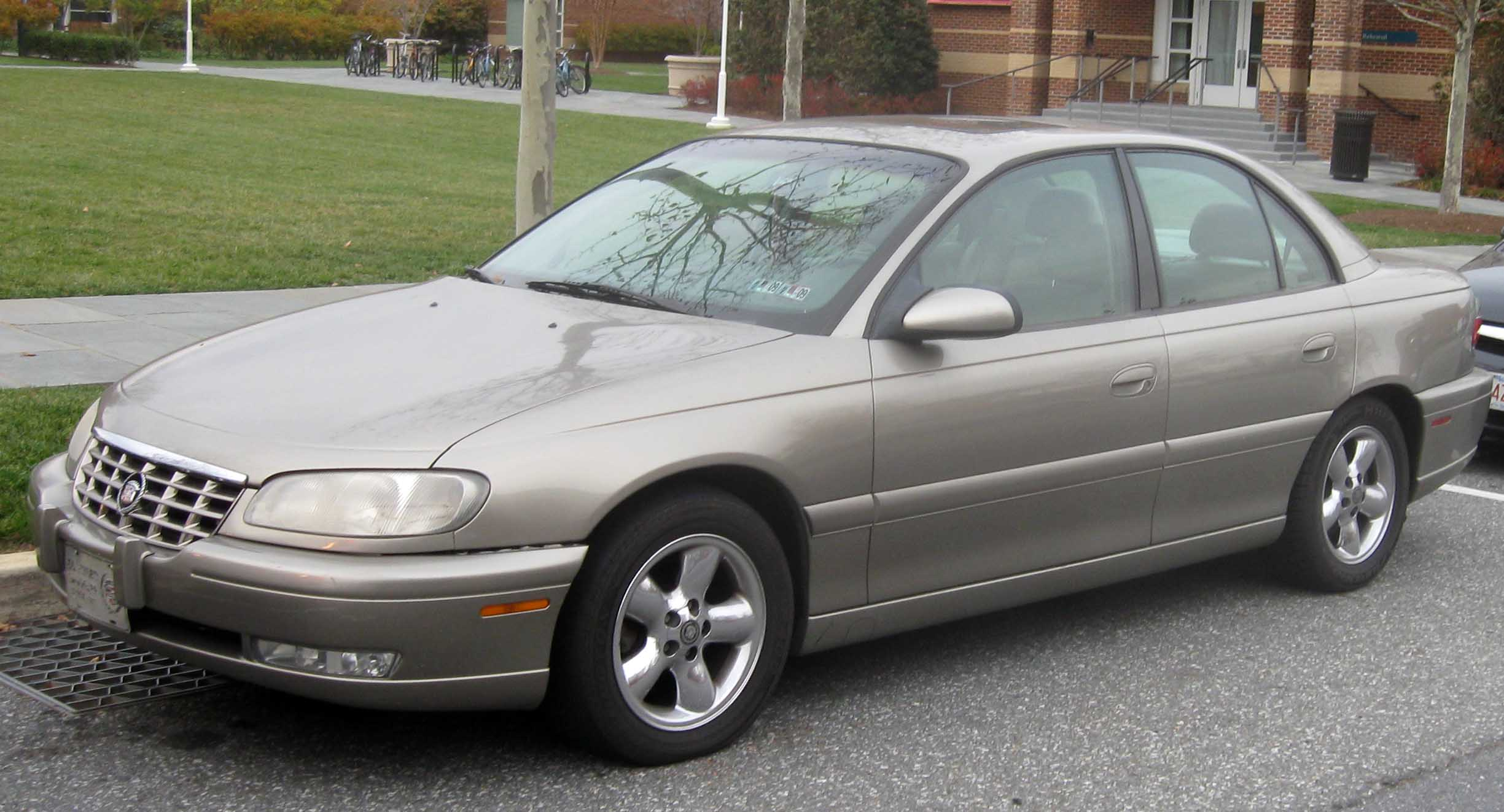
Cadillac Catera

The Cadillac Catera was the brand's second attempt to market a smaller, sportier model to a younger demographic, after the failure of the Cimarron during the 1980s. A modified version of the 1994 Opel Omega, the Catera was targeted to compete with compact German luxury cars such as the BMW 3 Series. While the Catera was better received by critics than the Cimarron, the Catera was a commercial failure; it could not match its German rivals in performance and capability, and it failed to appeal to Cadillac's existing customers. The car's unorthodox marketing campaign, featuring model Cindy Crawford and a cartoon duck named "Ziggy", has been cited as a factor in the Catera's failure. In addition, the Catera quickly developed a reputation as unreliable due to the 3.0L engine’s proclivity to fail due to the timing belt tensioner failing, causing the engine to trash itself; one vehicle broke down multiple times during a test by Automobile magazine.

Naming it one of the "10 Most Embarrassing Award Winners in Automotive History", Car and Driver retroactively wrote of it,

Despite an ad campaign that featured both Cindy Crawford and animated versions of the ducks found on the Cadillac crest, there was just no way to hide the fact that the Catera was a snoozer. The styling was generic and gelatinous, the interior bland, and the chassis response lackadaisical, and the 3.0-liter V-6's 200 hp had to strain against a nearly 3900-pound curb weight. About the only thing truly interesting about the Catera was its calamitous reliability record.

Autoweek described the Catera as a "badge engineered bomb". Popular Mechanics described the Catera as "a car that couldn't zag into obscurity quickly enough", including the car on its list of "10 Cars That Deserved to Fail". Jalopnik named the Catera one of the worst German cars of all time.

U.S. News & World Report magazine listed the Catera's "Princess" advertisement as one of the worst car commercials of all time, describing Ziggy as "a bargain-basement imitation of a Looney Tunes character" and Crawford's character as a "sexist representation of women". Curbside Classic noted that the Catera strongly resembled the much cheaper 1997 Chevrolet Malibu that was launched around the same time. The website described the car's "The Cadillac That Zigs" ad campaign as "stupid", and the website noted that the car's poor resale value caused large financial losses for GM, since a majority of the cars were leased. However, the website also noted that the Catera convinced GM to continue making Cadillacs smaller and sportier, leading to the critically acclaimed Cadillac CTS, which led to the brand's resurgence as competition against German imports during the 2000s. Edmunds named the Catera the 22nd worst car of all time.

=== Jaguar S-Type (1999–2007) ===
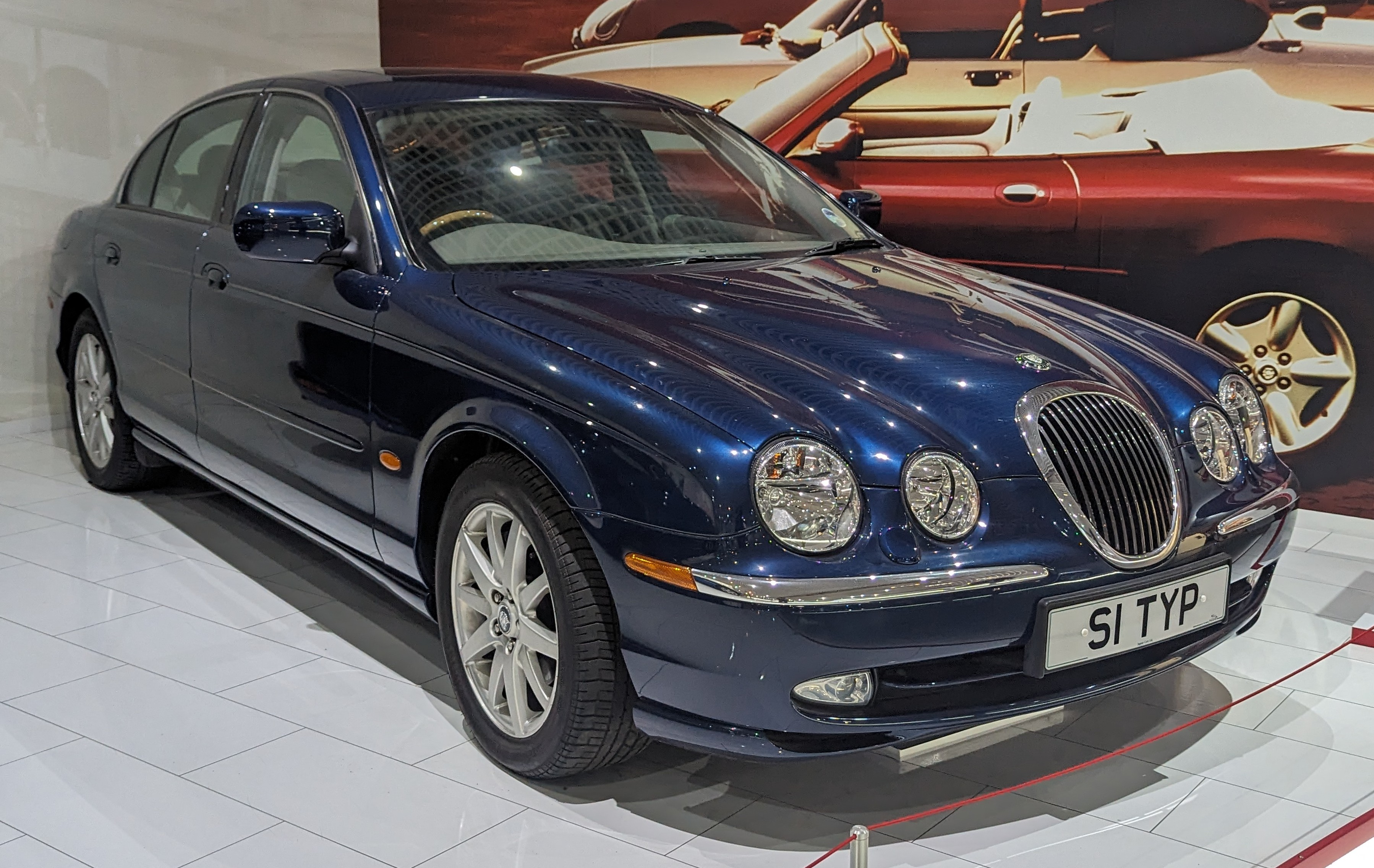
Jaguar S-Type

The Jaguar S-Type, launched at the beginning of 1999, was an executive car with retro styling that revived the S-Type nameplate first used by Jaguar in 1963. The car was praised on its release for having a "luxurious interior", a "creamy composure", and a "class-leading" "cosseting ride". The 2.7 V6 twin-turbo diesel engine, in particular, was described as "a paragon of refinement, quietness, and fuel economy" by the European automotive press, with enough "refinement and performance to wean anyone off petrol power".

The car's initial positive reception faded as time passed, and the car attracted significantly more negative commentary as it aged. The retro design also earned a mixed reputation, with some comparing it unfavorably to the design of the Rover 75, which featured a contemporary design. Motoring Research said of the S-Type's styling:

[Rover] unveiled the 75 at the [1998] Birmingham Motor Show where Jaguar had just revealed its S-Type, and it was gradually dawning on the attending press that one of these cars was rather more convincing than the other. And it wasn't the Jaguar. The S-Type's retro references to the 1960s S-Type look forced to the point of awkwardness, and its cabin was almost bereft of the kind of beautiful detailing, and quality, that makes a Jag cabin so appealing.

In 2004, James May said that "in 15 or 20 years' time we'll look at the S-Type, and we'll think 'That's really awful'"; Jeremy Clarkson replied, "I think the S-type is basically like Beaujolais nouveau—awful when it came out and then just gets steadily worse as time passes". In addition, Clarkson strongly criticized the car in 2003 as "Jaguar's weakest hour", and the "weakest Jaguar ever"; he said that he particularly disliked the styling. James May harshly criticized the car, saying that he believed it was designed to appeal to the American and German markets, and that the styling pandered to common stereotypes of the United Kingdom held in those countries. Describing the radiator grille as 'goppingly awful', he said that the car 'sums up everything that's wrong with Jaguar', adding that the vehicle annoyed him and was bettered by its successor.

== 2000s ==
=== Pontiac Aztek (2001–2005) ===
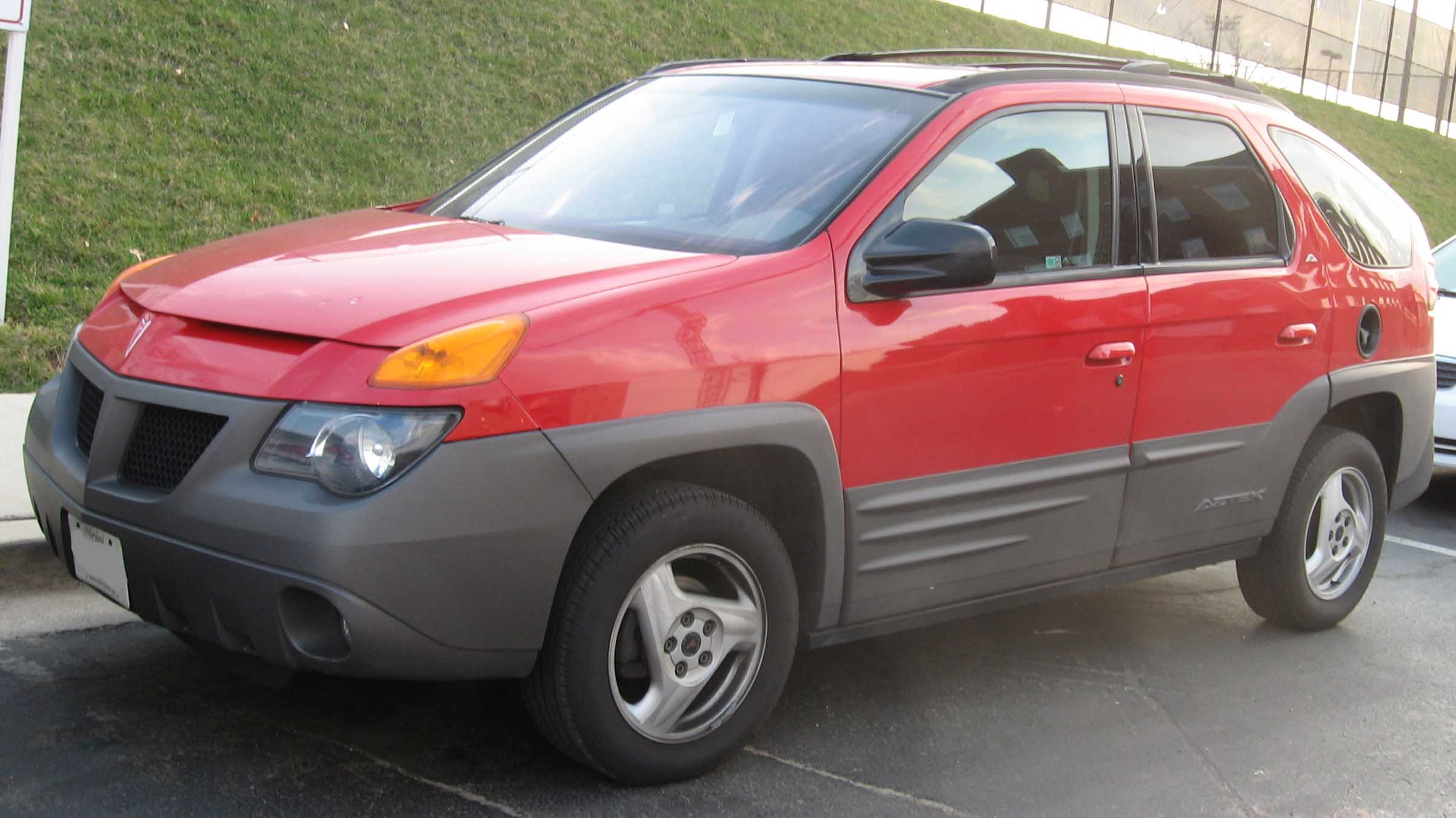
Pontiac Aztek

From the time it was unveiled in 2000, the Pontiac Aztek met with a strongly negative reception, mainly for its controversial styling, which former General Motors executive Bob Lutz described as resembling an "angry kitchen appliance". Autoblog listed the Aztek second on its list of "The 20 Dumbest Cars of All Time", criticizing its styling and stating, "GM execs cheaped out here, and were leading a system which minimized the influence of competent designers, and maximized the influence of accountants to produce cars at the cheapest cost." In the car's entry on Time's list of the 50 worst cars of all time, Dan Neil wrote,

I was in the audience at the Detroit auto show the day GM unveiled the Pontiac Aztek and I will never forget the gasp that audience made. Holy hell! This car could not have been more instantly hated if it had a Swastika tattoo on its forehead.

In a later piece, Time named the Aztek one of the 50 worst inventions of all time. The Los Angeles Times named the Aztek the "Worst Car Ever Sold in America".

The book Sixty To Zero by Alex Taylor III, which details the fall of General Motors, prominently features an Aztek on the cover. CNBC listed the Aztek as one of the 10 ugliest cars of all time. Popular Mechanics listed the Aztek as one of the 10 cars that damaged GM's reputation, because the Aztek's styling hampered GM's attempt to get a head start in an emerging market. In the last entry in Automotive Atrocities! The Cars We Love to Hate, Eric Peters says of the car, "The only vehicle to look like it's been in a bad accident even before it left the factory, the Aztek will be remembered as evidence that advanced degrees in automotive design are not necessarily indicators of good taste—or spelling ability." In 2014, Consumer Reports revealed that it conducted most of its testing of the Aztek at night because staffers were embarrassed to drive it; the organization added that this Aztek was still in its possession because it could not sell it when liquidating that year's test fleet. Edmunds ranked the Aztek as the worst car of all time:

Drive one and you quickly realize that the Aztek's exterior design is its best feature. It's the very worst car of all time because it's the only car on the list to kill an 84-year-old car company. It's undeniable that the Aztek's utter hideousness drove the biggest and last nails into Pontiac's heavily side-clad, plastic coffin.

=== Hummer H2 (2002–2009) ===
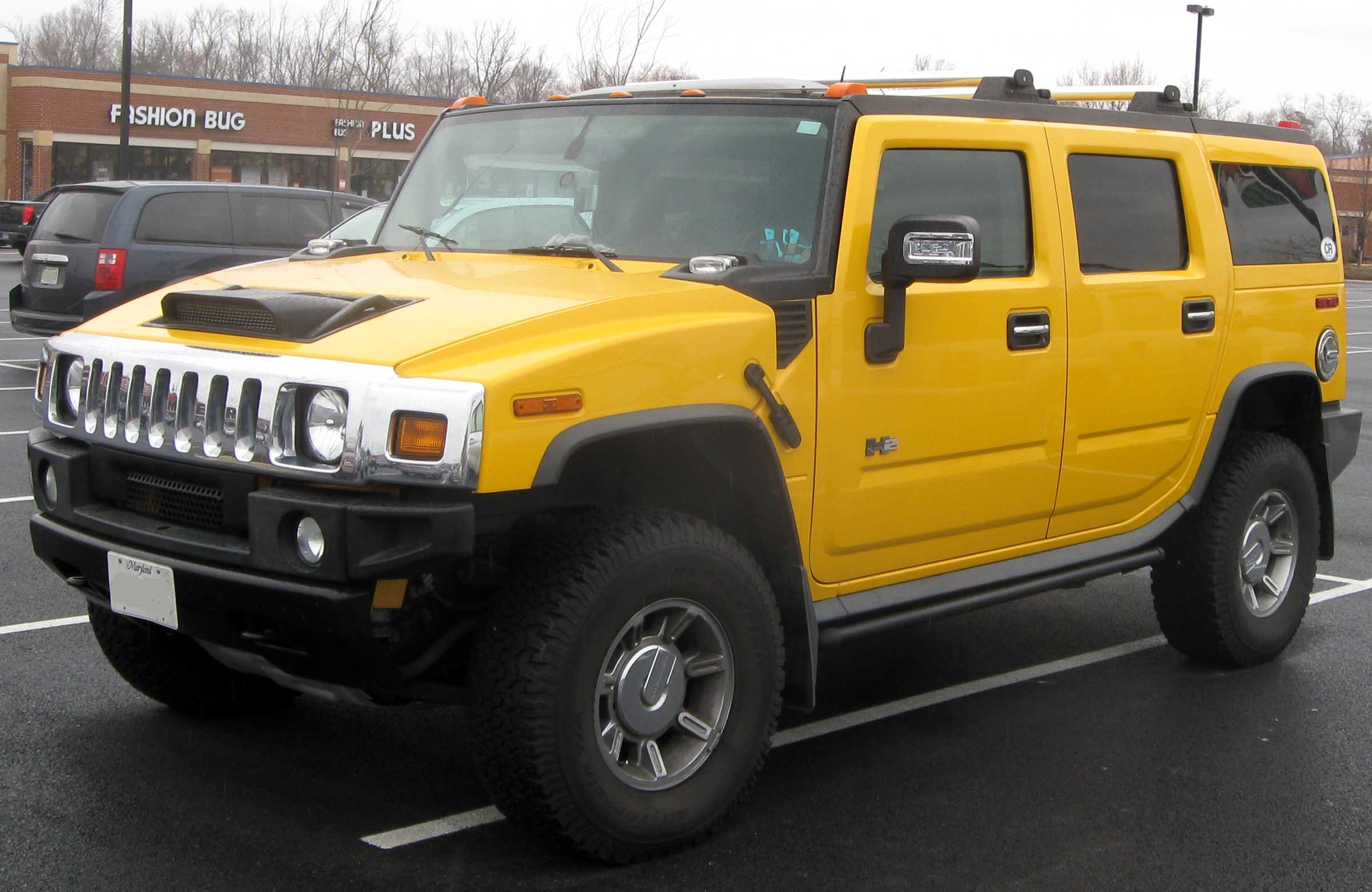
Hummer H2

The Hummer H2, built on the GMT800 platform, was introduced in late 2002 for the 2003 model year. The H2 was polarizing when introduced, and it has since gained a strongly negative critical reputation, as well as a negative social and political image in the United States. Including it on Time's list of the 50 worst cars of all time, Dan Neil wrote,

One struggles to think of a worse vehicle at a worse time. Introduced shortly after 9/11—an event whose causes were tangled in America's unquenchable thirst for oil — the Hummer H2 sent all the wrong signals. It was/is arrogantly huge, overly militaristic, openly scornful of the common good. As a vehicle choice, the H2 was a spiteful reactionary riposte to notions that, you know, maybe we all shouldn't be driving tanks that get 10 miles per gallon. The H2 was also a PR catastrophe for GM, who happened to be repossessing and crushing the few EV1 electric cars at the time. It all contributed to GM's emerging image as the Dick Cheney of car companies.

Popular Mechanics listed the H2 as one of the 10 cars that damaged GM's reputation, noting how the car was launched around the same time as the Toyota Prius; was "politically incorrect in an era where the forces of political correctness [were] winning"; and used styling that resembled a military vehicle as a selling point while opposition to the Iraq War was at a fever pitch. These problems were compounded by the large financial losses that the Hummer brand caused when sales collapsed during the 2000s energy crisis, leading the magazine to summarize the H2 as "a self-inflicted headache GM [didn't] need".

Jalopnik named the H2 one of the 10 worst cars of the 2000s:

Say hello to the Sierra Club's Antichrist: The H2 is the younger brother of AM General's massive Hummer H1. GM birthed this overfed monstrosity in an effort to bring the H1's street cred and off-road talent to America's middle class.

Jalopnik noted that the H2 had excellent off-road capabilities, but "The interior is cramped, chintzy, and claustrophobic. Frame and mechanicals are largely last-gen Chevy Tahoe/GMC Yukon bits, only they carry more weight and complain more often." Autoblog included the car on its list of "The 20 Dumbest Cars of All Time", stating,

The Hummer H2 may have tried to appeal to outdoorsy adventure seekers, but what it attracted were mostly people who advocate for tofu to be actually banned by law. [The H2 eventually became] the poster cars for American excess and environmental insensitivity. Few other vehicles created such a visceral response from others than the Hummer H2. The whole vehicle was in really bad taste, though we understand there are plenty of state militia and World Wrestling Federation fans who think otherwise.

ConsumerGuide included the H2 on its list of "The Ten Worst Cars in the Past Ten Years":

Though reasonably capable off-road, the H2 wasn't actually fun in the wild. It was difficult to see out of, and far too wide to navigate the type of twisty trails most often enjoyed by Jeep enthusiasts. Additionally, the H2's cabin was made mostly of hard, industrial-grade plastic, and its thirst for fuel was exacerbated by the need for pricey premium gas. The worst part, though, was driving a vehicle that became the poster child for vehicular conspicuous consumption.

Forbes included the car on its list of "12 Most Embarrassing Cars", noting that the Hummer H2's "wretched excess" arrived at a time when the large-SUV fad was fading. The Australian used-car review website ReDriven ranked the H2 first on its list of "The 5 Worst Cars You Can Buy Right Now", stating that the H2 was more about image than substance. The website added that the H2 was by far the most complained-about vehicle in the research and interviews it conducted when compiling the list. The H2 is parodied in the video game series Grand Theft Auto as the Mammoth Patriot, which features extravagant American flag decals and a description on an in-game website stating,

The original and best way to invite the loathing of every liberal and peacenik on the interstate, the Patriot is three tons of solid liberty coming straight out of the days when you could still afford a tank of gas.

In 2017, Autotrader published an article and accompanying video entitled "The Hummer H2 Is the Most Embarrassing Car You Can Buy", in which automotive writer Doug DeMuro rented an H2 from Turo and drove it around Florida:

I simply had to know what it was like; I had to know how it felt; I had to know if everything I ever assumed about it was true. And I'm happy to report that it is true—that the H2 is just as bad as you could've ever expected. Now you can feel like you're justified when you see one driving down the road and you start to chuckle.

=== Jaguar X-Type (2001–2009) ===
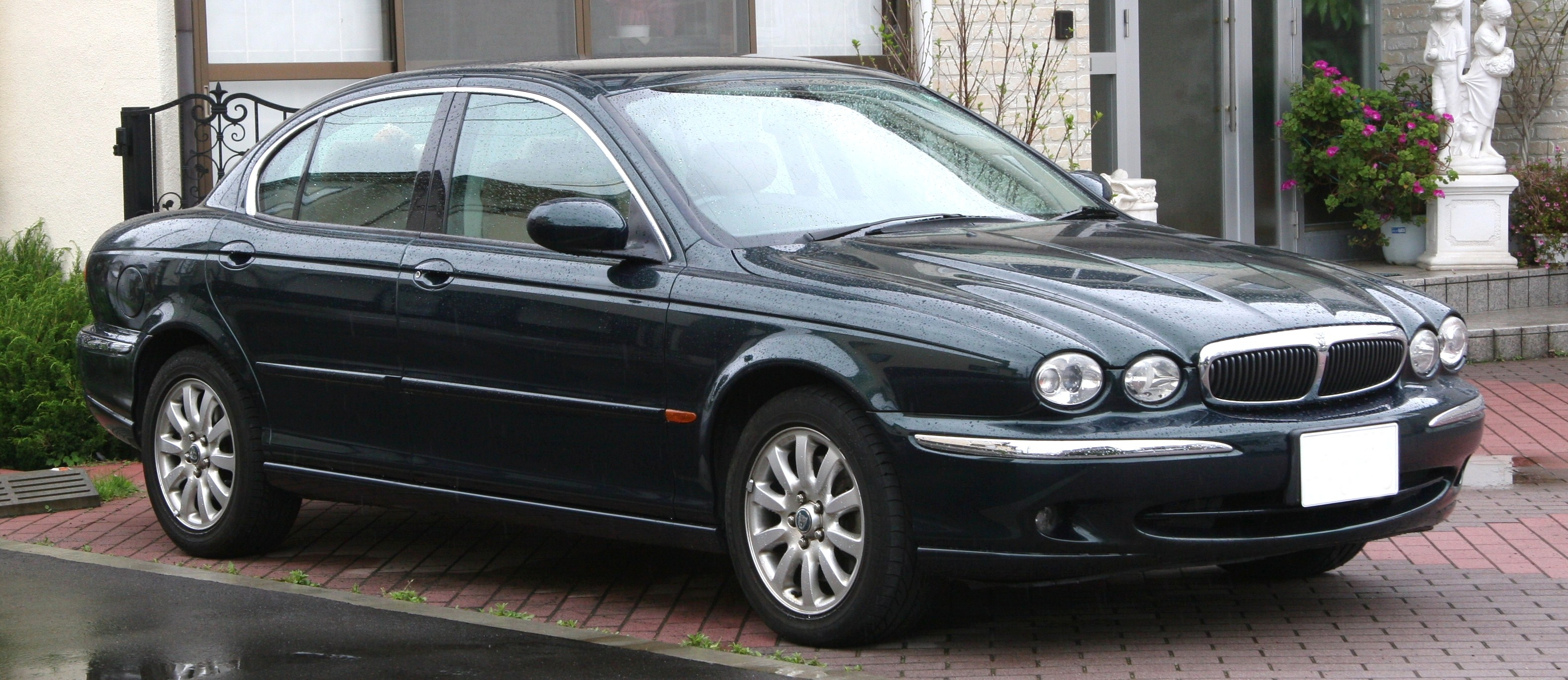
Jaguar X-Type

Launched in the summer of 2001, the Jaguar X-Type—designed to compete with compact luxury cars such as the Mercedes-Benz C-Class—was a commercial failure that has earned derision for being based on the more downmarket Ford Mondeo. Named one of the 50 worst cars of all time by Time, Dan Neil wrote of it,

In its attempt to turn [the Mondeo] into an "all-wheel drive" sports sedan, Jaguar ran smack into the limits of platform engineering. The result was the English version of the Cadillac Cimarron, a tarted-up insult to a once-proud marque and a financial disaster for the company.

The New York Times dubbed the X-Type "The Worst Car of the Decade". AOL UK named the X-Type one of the worst cars of the 2000s.

Car and Driver wrote of the X-Type,

Engines seized, interiors collapsed, transmissions exploded, and driveshafts—oh, the countless, countless driveshafts—ate their U-joints so regularly that you could set your watch by them. At a time when Jaguar reliability was finally approaching respectable, the all-wheel-drive X-type was the lone, laughable holdout. It was obnoxiously underbuilt, remarkably overpriced, and about as charming as a hernia.

Australian used car review site ReDriven included the X-Type on its list of "The 5 Worst Cars You Can Buy Right Now", noting its Mondeo origins and many documented reliability problems while describing it as "dishonest" and "a great example of luxury brands not necessarily equating to quality products". Edmunds ranked the X-Type the 84th worst car of all time, describing it as Jaguar "Spitting on its own heritage".

The X-Type remained on sale for eight years. After production ended in 2009, Jaguar did not launch a replacement model until the arrival of the Jaguar XE in 2015.

=== Lincoln Blackwood (2002) ===
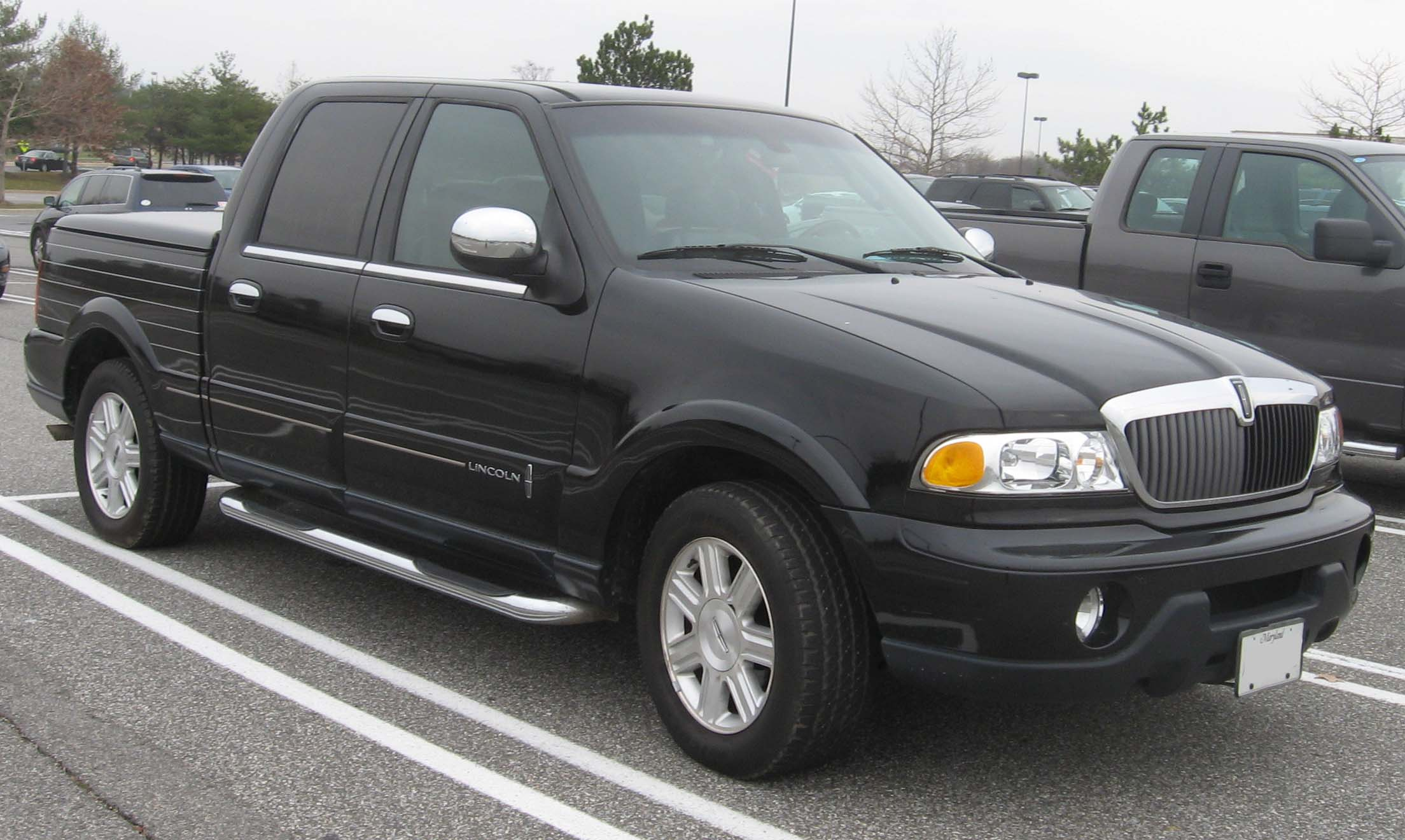
Lincoln Blackwood

The Lincoln Blackwood is a pickup truck version of the popular Lincoln Navigator SUV and Ford F-150 SuperCrew. The Blackwood was a major commercial failure, withdrawn from the market within a year; selling off the remaining inventory took two more years. Reviewers wrote about the truck's lack of utility and off-road capability. Listing the Blackwood as one of "The 20 Dumbest Cars of All Time", Autoblog stated,

Ford CEO Jacques Nasser and his luxury brand chief Wolfgang Reitzle thought it was a great idea: a luxury Lincoln branded pickup truck with a trunk instead of a flat bed and pin-stripe painting to mimic a business suit. [The Blackwood was] one of those vanity projects hatched at the top.

Car and Driver named the Blackwood one of the worst failures of the past 25 years, saying, "Check out the cargo box: It's lined in carpet and gen-yoo-wine stainless steel. That's stainless—means it can't be stained. You can't carry nuthin' heavy or dirty in it without uglying it up, but it makes for a nice trunk, see?"

Jalopnik included the Blackwood on its list of "Ten Cars That Should Have Never Left the Factory", saying,

Riding the cheap upgrade, big margin wave of the Navigator, Ford gave its F150 the same treatment, calling it the Blackwood. Except they stripped out every ounce of actual utility from the vehicle, save for towing, by making it a RWD only pickup with an Aluminum lined, carpeted, power tonneau'd bed. This was where they decided to pour their resources rather than refining their new RWD LS sedan. This is a symbol of the fall of the brand. Now we're stuck with a lifeless shell of a company, making badge engineered Fords that bastardize the Mark (MK?) name.

=== Renault Avantime (2002–2003) ===
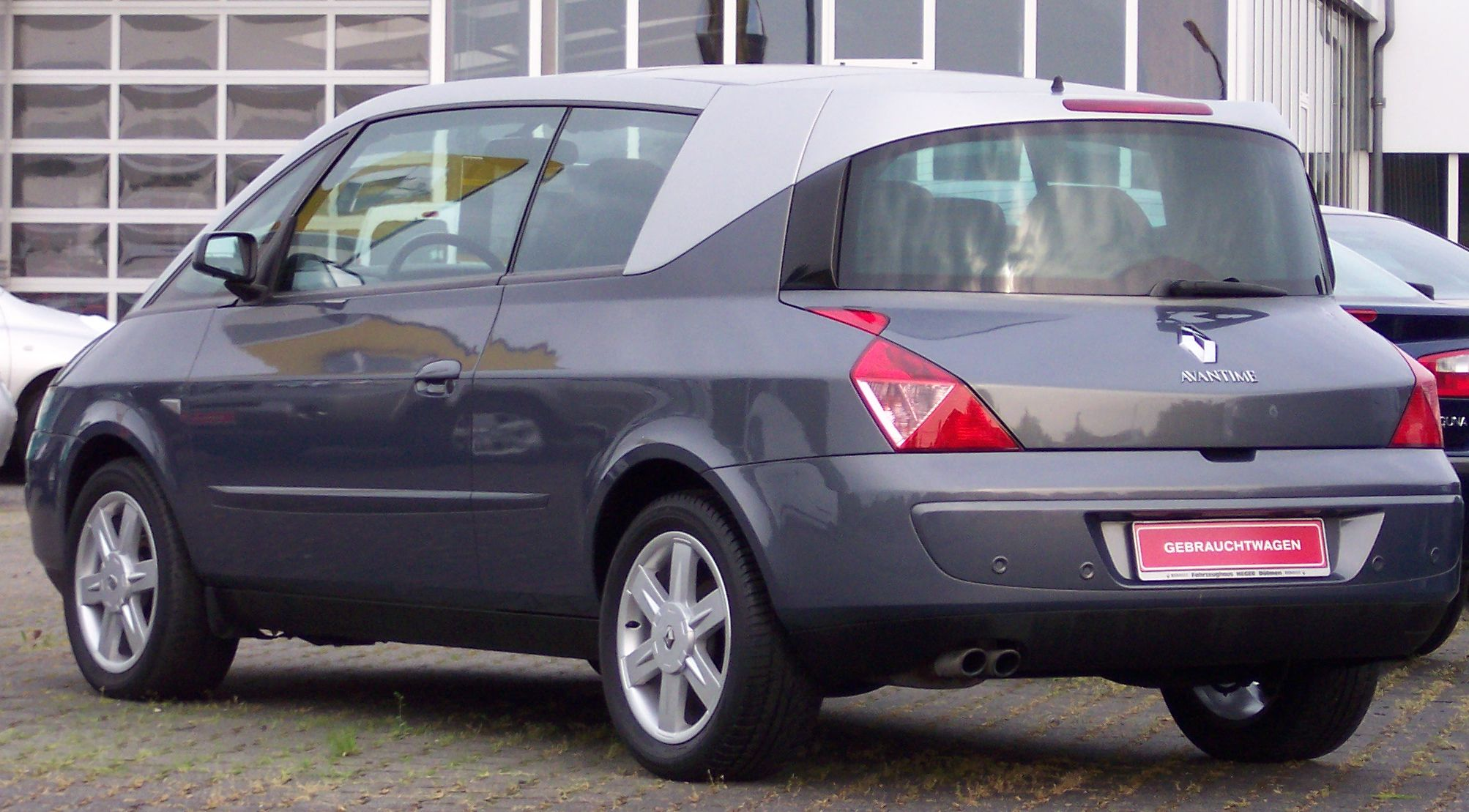
Renault Avantime rear view

In the late 1990s, Renault started manufacturing its new generation of Espace multi-purpose vehicle (MPV) in-house instead of at Matra, which then needed a new product to build. Renault chose to create a luxury coupe based on the old Espace. According to Craig Cheetham in World's Worst Cars, "the car was doomed to failure by its very concept." Despite being based on the same platform as the Espace minivan, the car was designed for only four people, and rear legroom was disappointing. Retaining the height of an MPV, the car appeared tall and ungainly. The Renault Avantime became one of the biggest sales failures in automotive history. Only 8,557 units were sold, making it numerically rarer than some models of Rolls-Royce or Ferrari. Production ended in 2003 when Matra's car production company went bankrupt.

=== Renault Vel Satis (2002–2009) ===
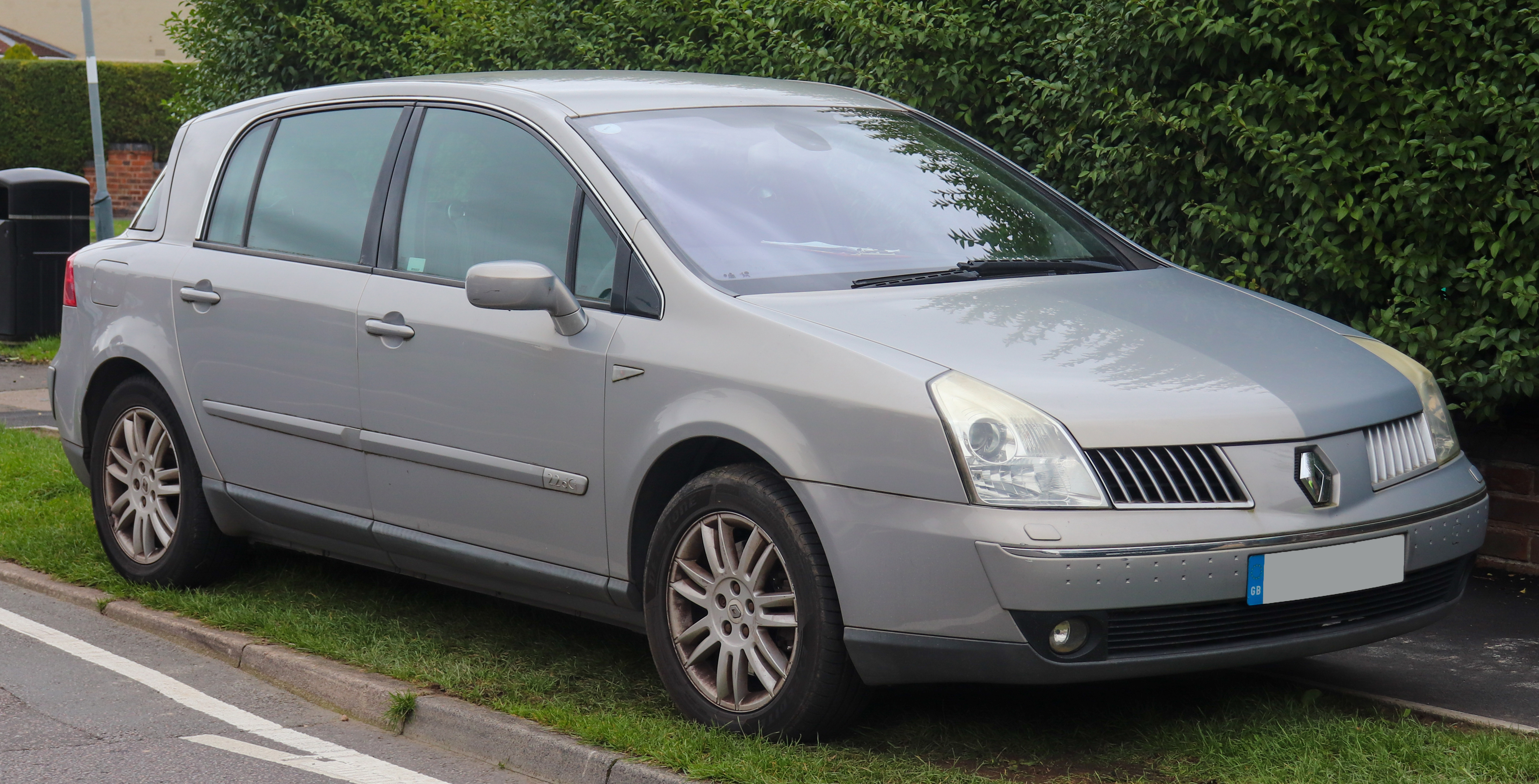
Renault Vel Satis

Renault's other effort to tap into the luxury market was a more conventional, but still oddly designed, four-door hatchback limousine called Vel Satis. It received some praise for its high level of comfort, but its road handling was considered poor; moreover, its design was often ridiculed, because designer Patrick Le Quément was primarily interested in presence rather than elegance. AOL ranked the Vel Satis the ninth worst car of the 2000s:

the French company was off to a loser from the off thanks to the Vel Satis's ugly looks and driving dynamics that were way off the pace. The most distinctive but unattractive design features include the large front headlight units and bloated rear styling.

The Oxford Mail included the Vel Satis in its "The worst cars Evah!" series, saying that it

looked like a cartoon with a radiator shaped like a gaping tooth-filled mouth. All it needed was a Gauloises cigarette wedged on one side and the image would have been complete. Even the French thought Renault had gone mad and sales were disastrous. Instead of being sexy and sophisticated, it was seen as fat and ugly.

Autocar included the Vel Satis in the article on "The worst cars of the decade", commenting, "Lumpy looks and a lumpy ride, for both the occupants and its maker." Jalopnik said,

What's the worst French car ever? Obviously, it's the Renault Vel Satis, an overpriced, under-luxurious stinkbomb that beat Toyota to the uncontrolled-acceleration issue by about five years. Worse than that, it was completely charmless, and charm is usually a French car's saving grace.

The car received a facelift in 2005, when Renault stopped making the right-hand-drive version. The revised model continued until 2009. It had no direct successor, leaving Renault without an executive car until the 2010 release of the Renault Latitude.

=== Rover CityRover (2003–2005) ===
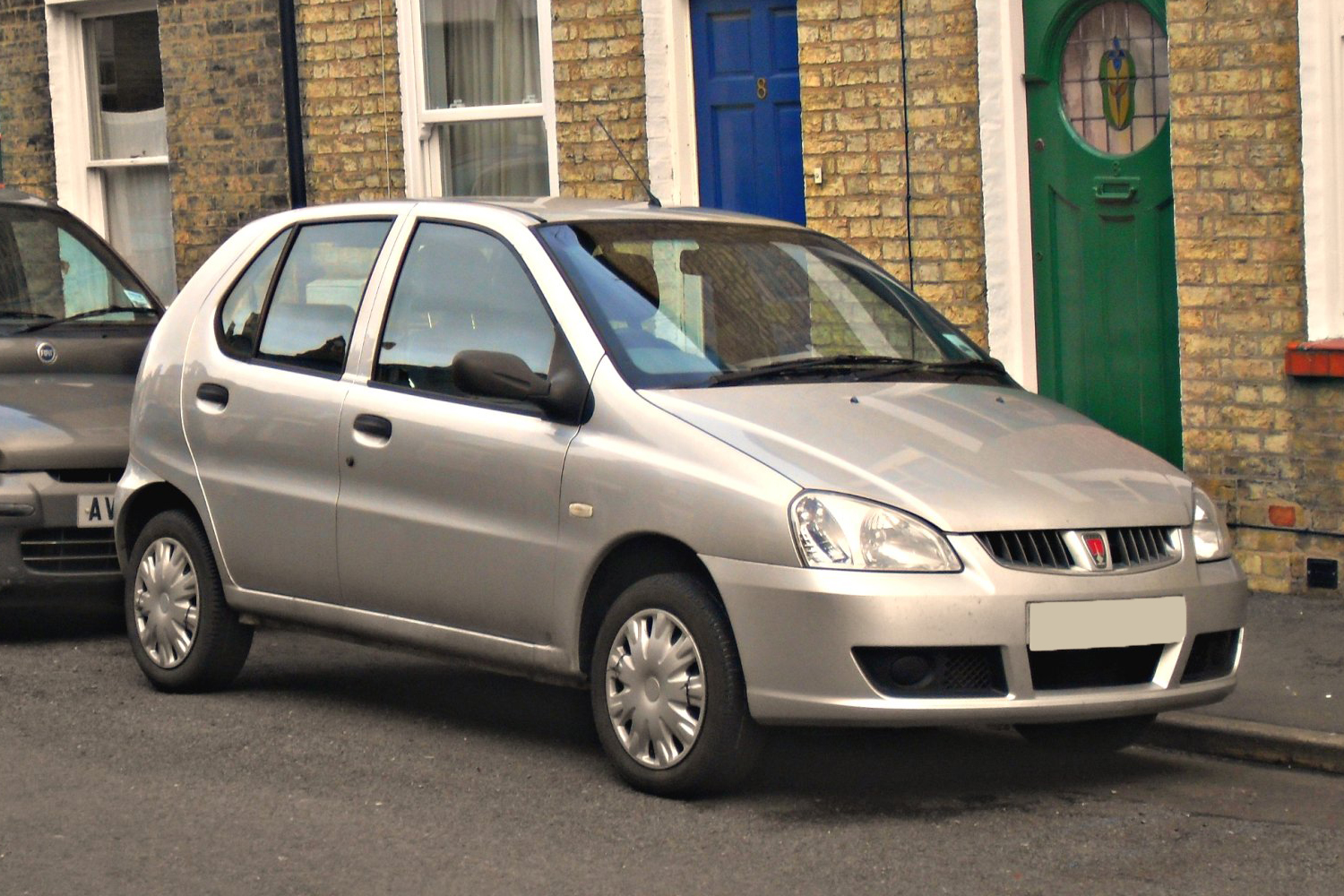
Rover CityRover

The Rover CityRover was a rebadged Tata Indica that was tweaked for European regulations, and it was sold in the UK, Ireland and a few countries in Continental Europe. The car resulted from MG Rover wanting to offer a new small car after the Rover 100 was discontinued in 1998 and the Mini was discontinued in 2000; however, because the company was in financial trouble and lacked the funds to develop a new small car by itself, the company entered into a deal with Indian Tata Motors. MG Rover reportedly paid Tata £3,000 for each car and—despite each model featuring a Rover corporate nose and revised suspension settings—the £6,495 starting price was considered too high. In May 2004, Rover refused to lend a CityRover to Top Gear for testing, so James May went undercover and test-drove one at a dealership while carrying a hidden camera. May then said that the CityRover was the worst car he had ever driven on the program. Sales were well short of MG Rover's targets, so the CityRover was given an upgrade for the 2005 model year, with more standard equipment. In December 2004, prices were reduced by £900, confirming that the car's previous pricing had not been competitive.

According to car reviewer Parker's, the CityRover was the worst-rated Rover car from MG Rover, with a rating of two out of five. In October 2013, Top Gear magazine ranked the CityRover sixth on its list of "The thirteen worst cars of the last twenty years", stating,

The Rover CityRover—almost certainly not the inspiration behind the Ferrari LaFerrari—wasn't so much the last roll of the dice as the final nail in a faux-walnut coffin. The problem was the sheer cynicism with which it was piloted to market: you needed nine grand for a decently specced one.

In a 2016 Auto Express poll, the CityRover was voted the sixth worst car ever, with the article saying,

The end of MG Rover was comprehensively hastened by the launch of the CityRover, a small car with few redeeming qualities. Even though the Rover badge carried some prestige, buyers were not convinced by the CityRover's poor quality. The Indian-market Indica had already been in production for five years when the CityRover was launched, too, so it felt dated even as it first appeared in showrooms. Poor quality, modest performance and vague handling all counted against the CityRover, especially as it was priced so highly.

=== Chevrolet SSR (2003–2006) ===
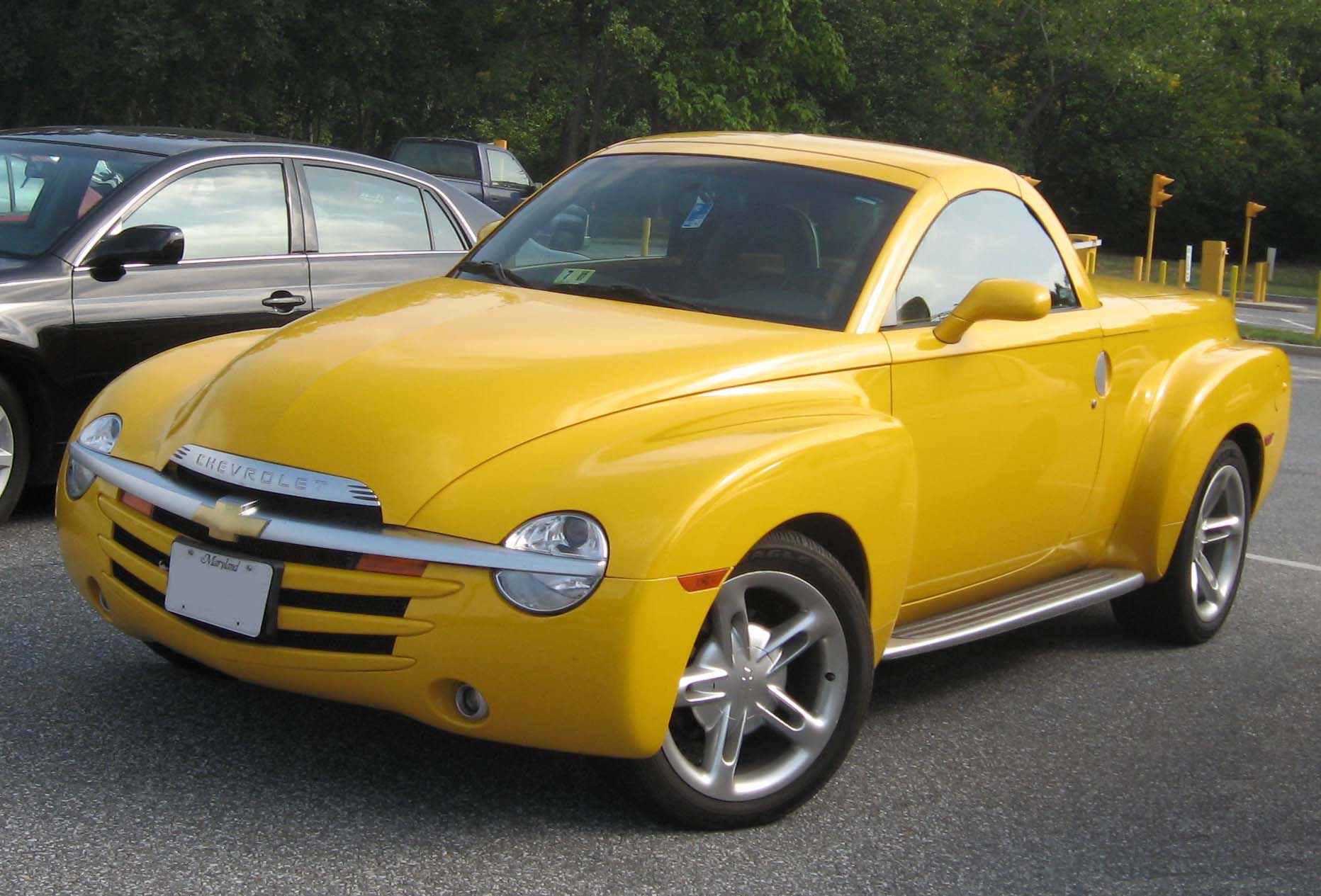
Chevrolet SSR

Launched for the 2003 model year, the Chevrolet SSR was a retro-styled hot-rod pickup truck based on the Chevrolet Trailblazer. The SSR was a commercial failure and met with lasting derision from critics because of its Trailblazer origins and poor performance. Naming it one of the 50 worst cars of all time, Time's Dan Neil described it as being "heavy, underpowered and unforgivably lazy. It was no more hotrod than Britney is the next Helen Mirren." Autoblog included the SSR on its list of "The 20 Dumbest Cars of All Time"; "The SSR answered the question no one asked. Who needs a retractable hardtop convertible roadster/pickup?"

Car and Driver, stating that the SSR "failed miserably", named it as one of the biggest failures of the past 25 years:

It's a convertible. It's a pickup. It's a car. It's yet another example of how the American people refuse to pay for anything even remotely corporate where hot-rod culture is concerned. Yep, that's right: It's the Chevrolet SSR, and we can hear you yawning already.

Edmunds listed the SSR as one of the worst automotive failures of the last decade:

Is it a pickup or a roadster? Neither, because both of those can justify their existence. The retro-styled Chevrolet SSR is one of the oddest vehicles ever squeezed from Detroit's loins. Some say that the SSR stood out on the highway. So does a car fire.

Edmunds also named the SSR the 60th worst car of all time.

=== Saturn Ion (2003–2007) ===
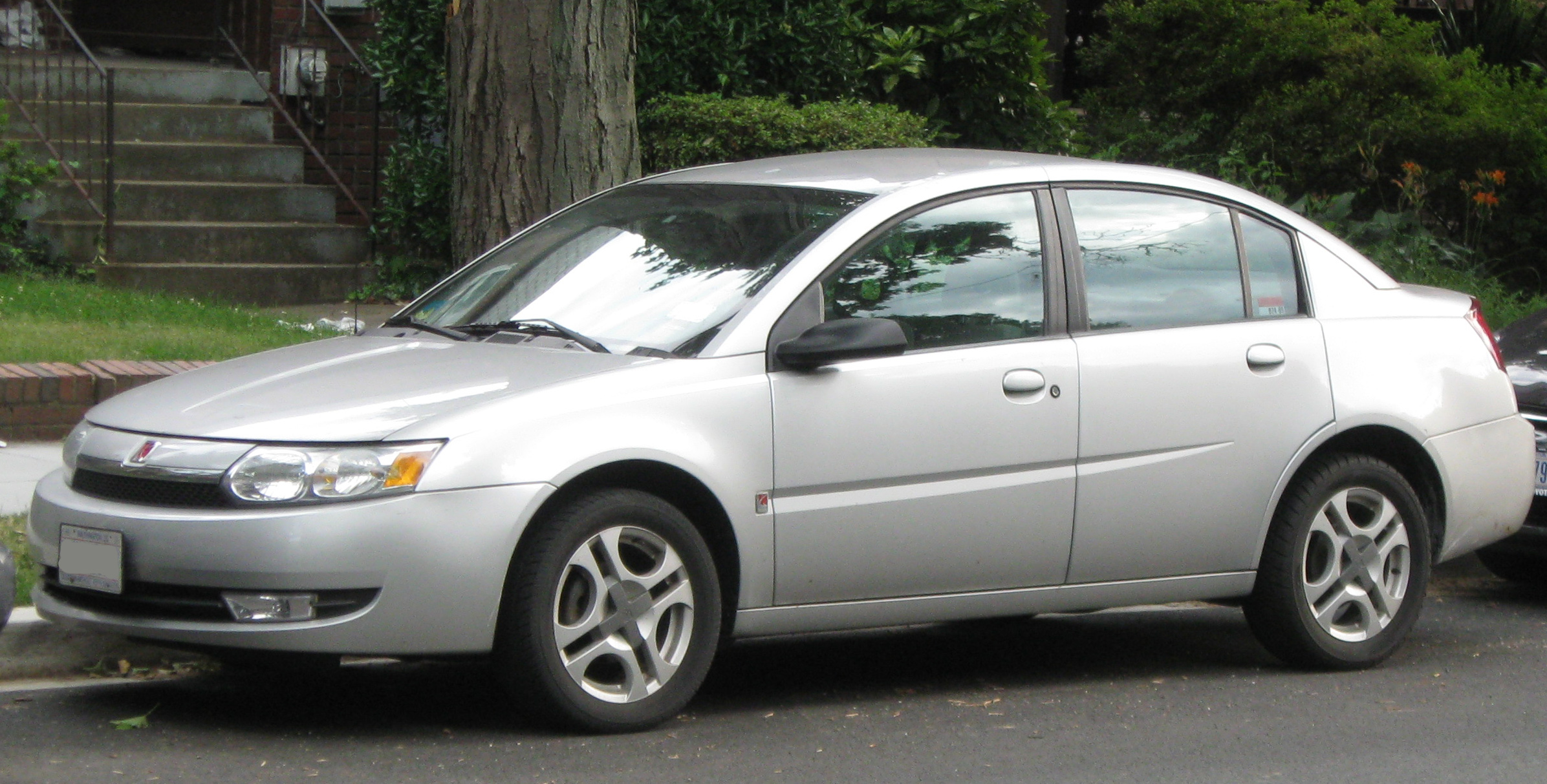
2003 Saturn Ion

Unlike its successful and critically acclaimed predecessor—the Saturn S series—the Saturn Ion, based on the GM Delta platform, garnered largely negative reviews for its poor design, poor quality, and poor driving dynamics. The car was considered a reason for the downfall of the once-successful Saturn marque, which was discontinued by its parent company General Motors in 2010. The Ion was notable for its quality, safety, and construction problems that led to a total of 12 recalls, including one for a faulty ignition switch that led to many deaths among all GM Delta-based cars.

Another issue was the Ion's unusual design: the instrument panel with the speedometer and all other gauges was placed above the center console, rather than in the usual location in front of the driver; this placement received particular criticism. Edmunds ranked the Ion the sixth worst car of all time; the Los Angeles Times ranked the car fifth on its list of the 10 worst cars ever sold in the United States; Best Life ranked the car the 19th worst of the 21st century; and MotorBiscuit ranked the car first on its list of the "25 most hated cars of all time". After only four years on the market, the Ion was replaced by the Astra, a rebadged Opel Astra H imported from Europe.

=== Pontiac GTO (2003–2006) ===
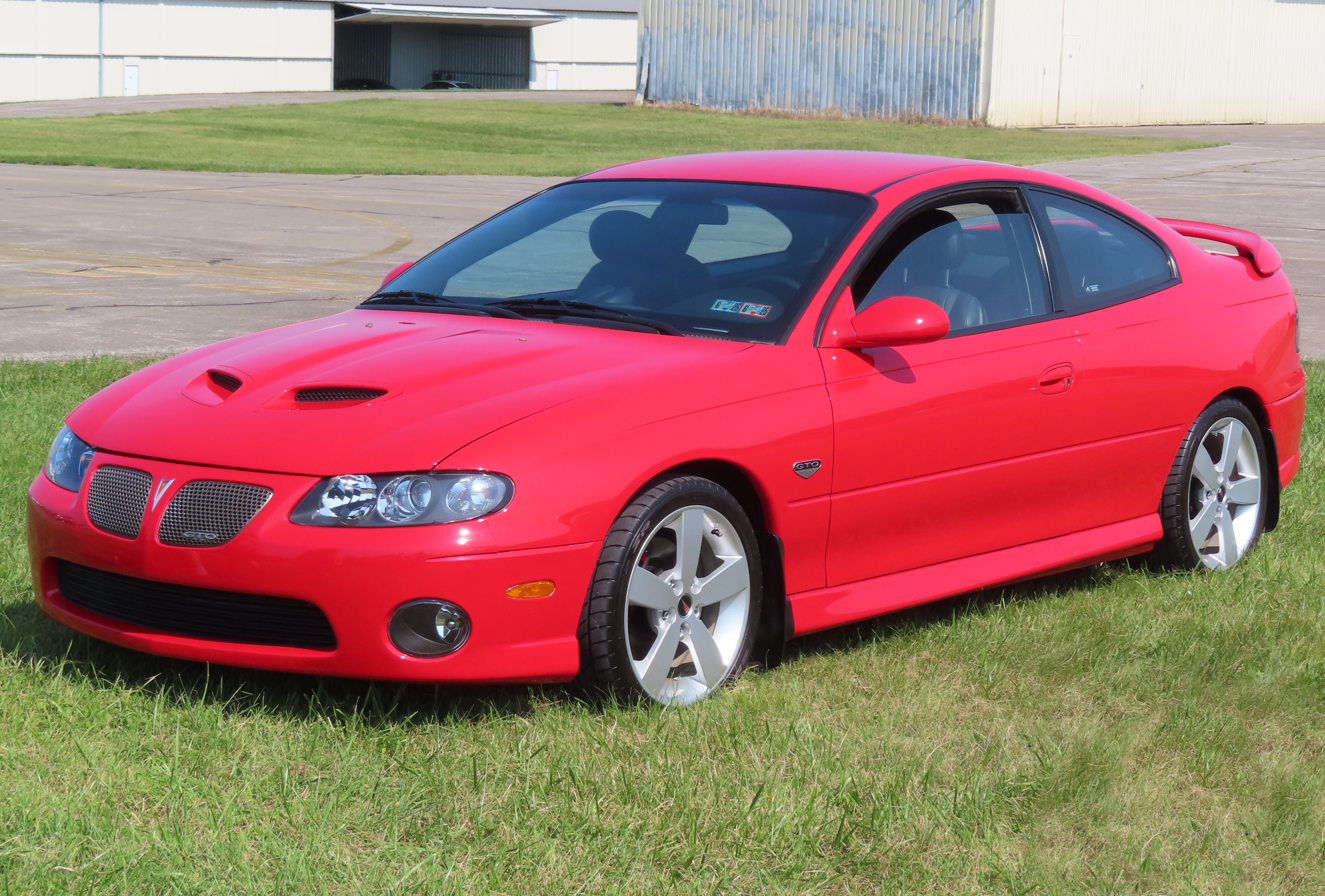
2006 Pontiac GTO

In 2003, Pontiac revived the once-successful GTO muscle car by importing a slightly modified Australian Holden Monaro, equipped with a 5.7L LS1 V8 engine, to the US. Sales remained far behind expectations, which was mainly blamed on the car's bland design, poor quality, comparatively high price, and Australian origins. It was also based on the Opel Omega B, which had previously been unsuccessfully imported to the US as the Cadillac Catera. Only 13,000 vehicles were sold in the first year, against a planned 18,000, and only about 40,000 were sold during the three years of production.

Car and Driver included the car on its list of "The 20 Biggest Automotive Flops of the Past 30 Years", saying, "The long-awaited return of a legendary nameplate, the Pontiac GTO arrived not with a bang but with a whimper." and "Styling that said 'bloated Chevy Cavalier' more than 'muscle car' didn't help, either. That ability to disappear in traffic, more than the indifferent quality control, interior oddities, or lack of options, probably kept the goat a rare beast." Popular Mechanics included the car on its list of "6 Retro Flops, and 6 Concept Cars That Should Have Replaced Them", saying,

Potential buyers were waiting for a modern beast with a retro edge, something like what Ford did with Mustang in the 2000s. But the GTO looked like a bloated Chevy Cavalier, not a hard-edged, heart-pumping take on the 1960s classic. ... A Sport Appearance Package tried to add some visual excitement, but the new GTO's looks just never found a passionate audience.

The website TheThings ranked the car 15th on its list of "The 15 Worst American Sports Cars Of All Time".

=== Chrysler Crossfire (2004–2008) ===
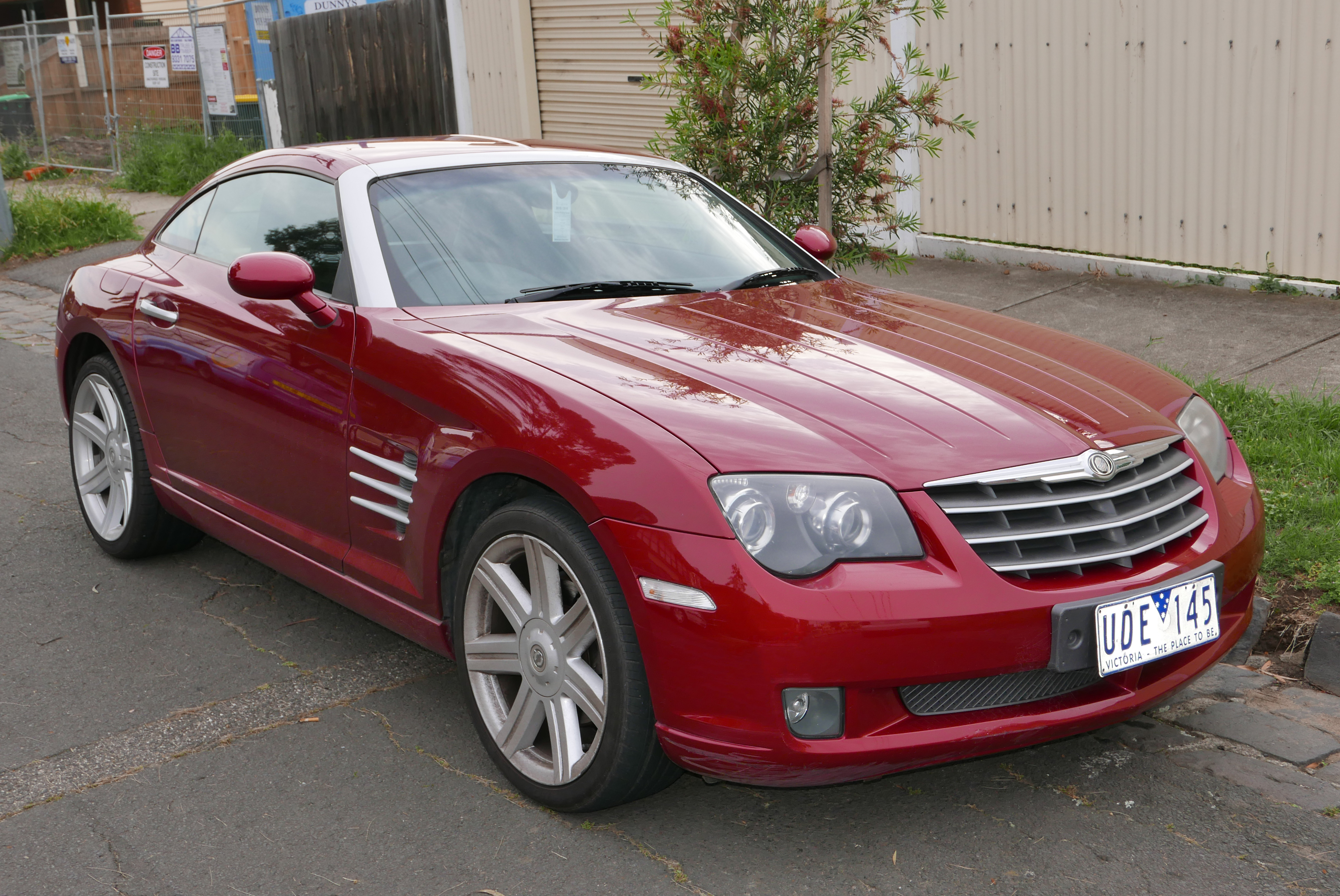
Chrysler Crossfire

The Chrysler Crossfire is a sports car manufactured by Chrysler that was effectively a Mercedes-Benz R170 with a new body. The Crossfire was a commercial failure, with dealers having a 230-day supply of the model by November 2005, prompting Chrysler to start selling it on the website Overstock. Top Gear magazine, citing a review by Jeremy Clarkson, included the Crossfire on its list of "The 13 Worst Cars of the Past 20 Years", describing it as

A half-decent concept that failed to make the grade in the real world. A first-gen Merc SLK underneath, it was outdated before it was even launched. The ultimate triumph of style over content, only without the style. Or much content.

The Daily Telegraph auto critic Stephen Bailey wrote about the Crossfire in a 2004 review:

This is indubitably the worst car I have ever driven. It beggars belief that the aristocrats of engineering, the artistes formerly known as Mercedes-Benz, have associated their name with such an aesthetic, functional and social atrocity.

Naming it one of the worst car failures of the past 25 years, Car and Driver wrote of it,

What do you get when you combine a bunch of rehashed, last-generation Mercedes-Benz chassis components with overwrought styling and a bit of D-town pride? This bright-eyed hunk of weirdness, that's what. Potential buyers were put off by the art-deco looks and the $35,000-plus buy-in, and many simply bought an SLK instead. Or an Infiniti G35 or a BMW 3-series, both of which were more fun to drive than the Crossfire, and neither of which looked like a dog in the middle of a life-altering dump.

Edmunds named the Crossfire one of the top automotive failures of the last decade:

The antiquated recirculating-ball steering made it slow to respond, handling was disappointing and at the same time, the ride was harsh. To further pile on the drawbacks, the interior fell short of expectations, as did overall performance and everyday convenience. In the end, not even Celine Dion could save the Crossfire, and the final insult came when remainders were sold off on overstock.com and eBay.

AOL UK named the Crossfire the worst car of the 2000s.

=== SsangYong Rodius (2004–2013) ===
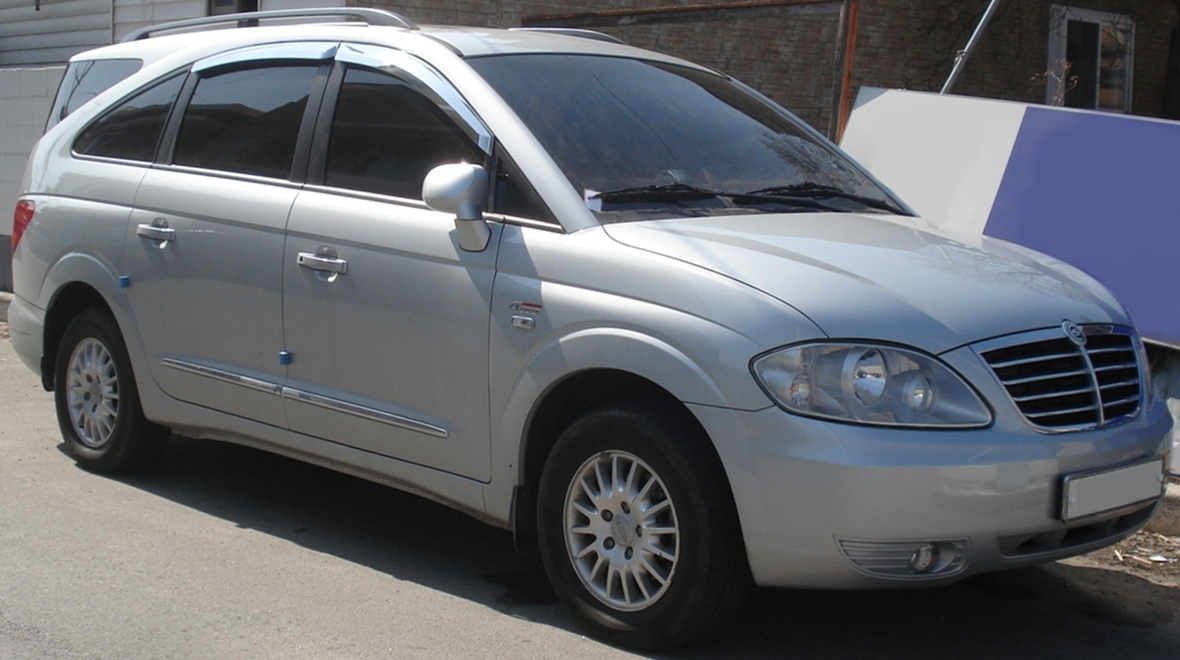
SsangYong Rodius

The SsangYong Rodius was a minivan and was SsangYong's first venture into the MPV segment. The car was praised for its roomy interior and utility, but highly ridiculed for its unconventional styling. It was voted the ugliest car in the UK in 2005, with an article on Jalopnik calling it an "R-Class with Down's Syndrome". Top Gear said, "The Rodius is so ugly that almost everyone knows what it is; they don't know its name, but they recognize it as the car Top Gear called the ugliest car in production today." Top Gear magazine also ranked the Rodius ninth on its list of "The 13 worst cars of the last 20 years". The Daily Telegraph ranked the car first in its list of the "10 worst cars ever sold in Britain", commenting, "'Looks like a melted hearse,' is the best description of the visually challenging SsangYong Rodius we've ever heard. If it were human, not even its mother could love it."

=== General Motors U-body minivans (third generation) (2005–2009) ===
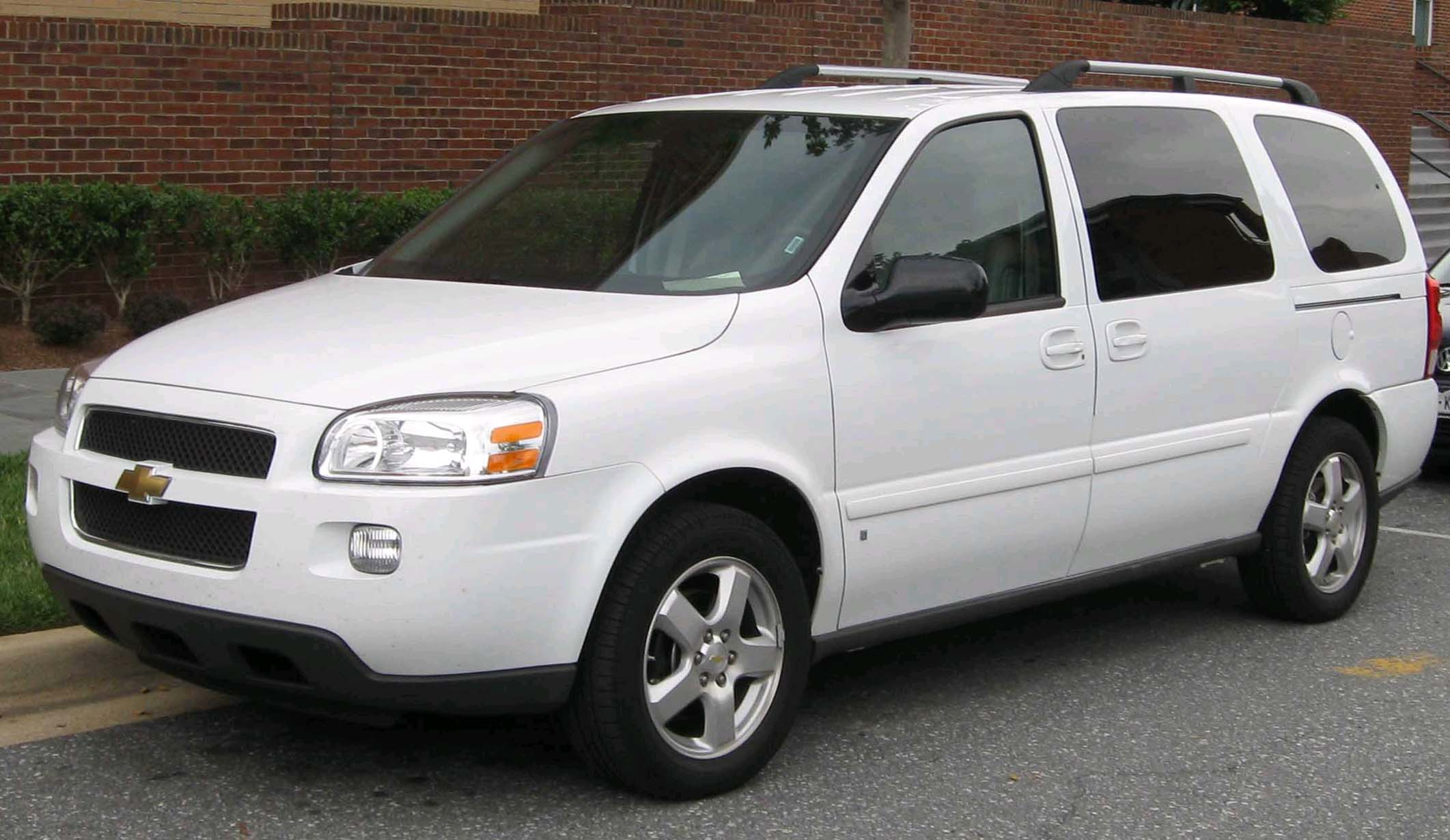
Chevrolet Uplander

In 2005, General Motors released a new generation of U-body minivans—which consisted of the Chevrolet Uplander and its rebadged derivatives, the Saturn Relay, the Buick Terraza, and the Pontiac Montana SV6—as successors to the successful previous generation, including the Chevrolet Venture. The car's reception was largely negative, mainly due to two factors: a poor design that attempted to be more like an SUV but was disliked by the public, and a technical layout that was partly based on the previous generation, making this layout outdated on launch. The Truth About Cars ranked the minivans first on its 2006 list of "Ten Worst Automobiles Today (TWAT) Awards", saying,

Talk about retro-design. Rather than simply cop styling cues from bygone classics, GM built the Chevrolet Uplander, Saturn Relay, Buick Terraza and Pontiac SV6 using 25-year-old engineering. (Though not literally true, it's true enough.) In terms of dreadful driving dynamics, contemptible aesthetics and torturous ergonomics, no other vehicles sold in America can compete with these ridiculously named "Crossover Sport Vans. For their antique engineering, woeful looks, cancerous effect on not one but four GM brands and their abject inability to hold a candle to their foreign-owned competition, GM's minivans earn The Truth About Cars' accolade as the worst vehicles currently for sale in America.

The New York Daily News named the Chevrolet Uplander one of the ten worst Chevrolet cars of all time. Jalopnik ranked the Uplander 10th on its list of the 10 worst GM cars ever built. The poor reception, as well as a general decrease in minivan sales due to the ongoing sales boom in SUVs, led General Motors to take two actions: exiting the minivan market in 2009 (except for China, where the Buick GL8 continues to be sold); and offering the Chevrolet Traverse, GMC Acadia, Buick Enclave, and the now discontinued Saturn Outlook SUVs as replacements.

=== Jeep Commander (2006–2010) ===
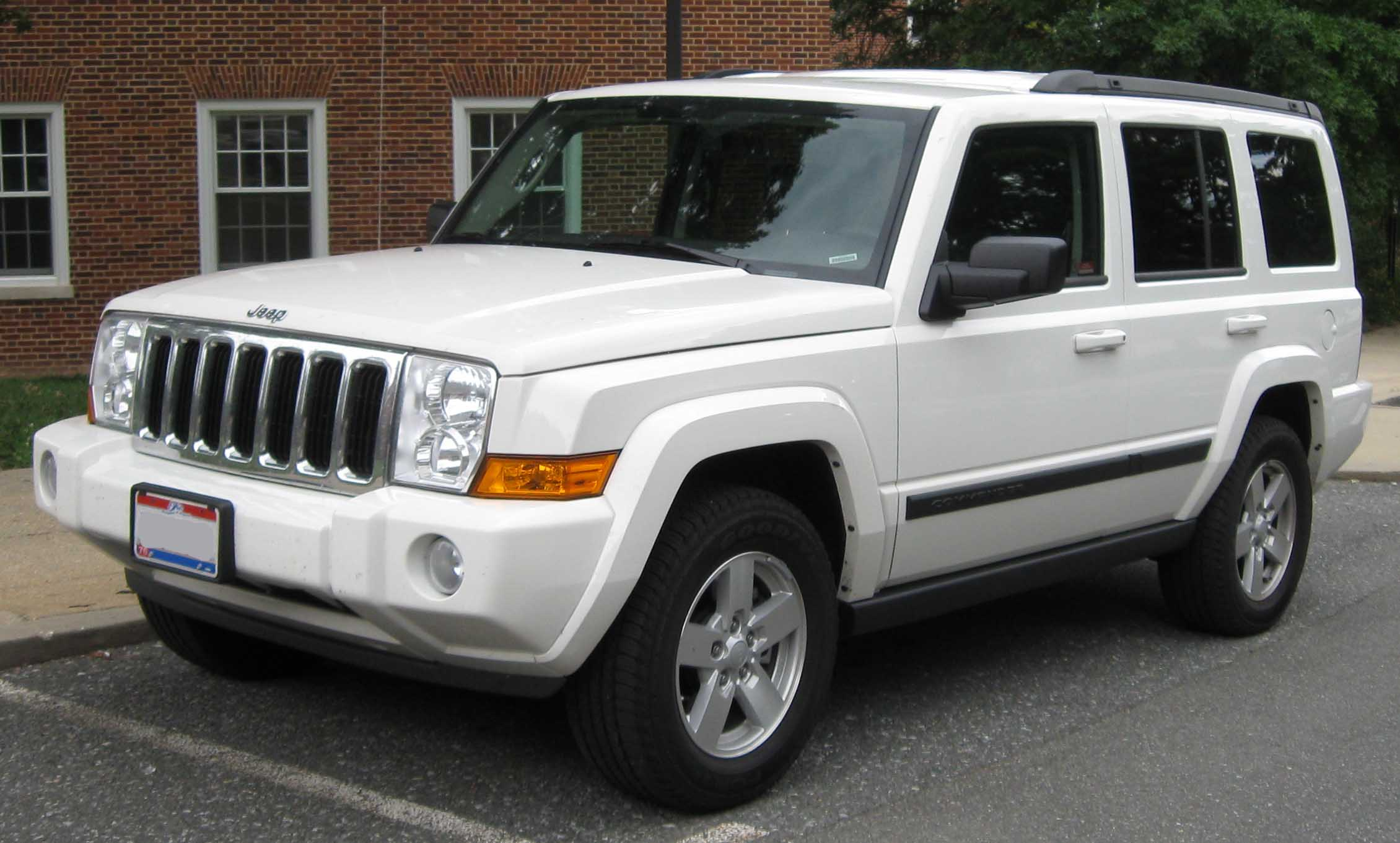
Jeep Commander

The Jeep Commander is a 3-row SUV based on the Jeep Grand Cherokee, introduced for the 2006 model year. Launched during the onset of the 2000s energy crisis, the Commander was a commercial failure that was withdrawn after four years on the market and received poor retroactive reviews. ConsumerGuide named the Commander one of the ten worst cars of the 2000s, describing it as "the big brother Jeep's Grand Cherokee never needed" and noted that even equipped with its smallest V6 engine, the car only achieved 14 miles per gallon (MPG) in testing.

New York Daily News and Four Wheeler both included the Commander on their lists of the 10 worst Jeep vehicles, both criticizing the Commander's poorly designed interior and the cramped feeling in all three rows of seats. New York Daily News described the Commander as "poorly designed" and "useless" and said of it, "Think of it this way: The Commander was only 2 inches longer than the Jeep Grand Cherokee, but about 400 pounds heavier. If ever there was a car that needed a diet and a treadmill, the Commander was it." The Truth About Cars named the Commander as a runner-up on its 2008 list of the ten worst cars on the market. Some of the harshest criticism of the Commander came from Chrysler CEO Sergio Marchionne: he ended production within months of taking over the company and shortly thereafter said of it, "That vehicle was unfit for human consumption. We sold some. But I don't know why people bought them."

=== Jeep Compass (first generation) (2007–2016) ===
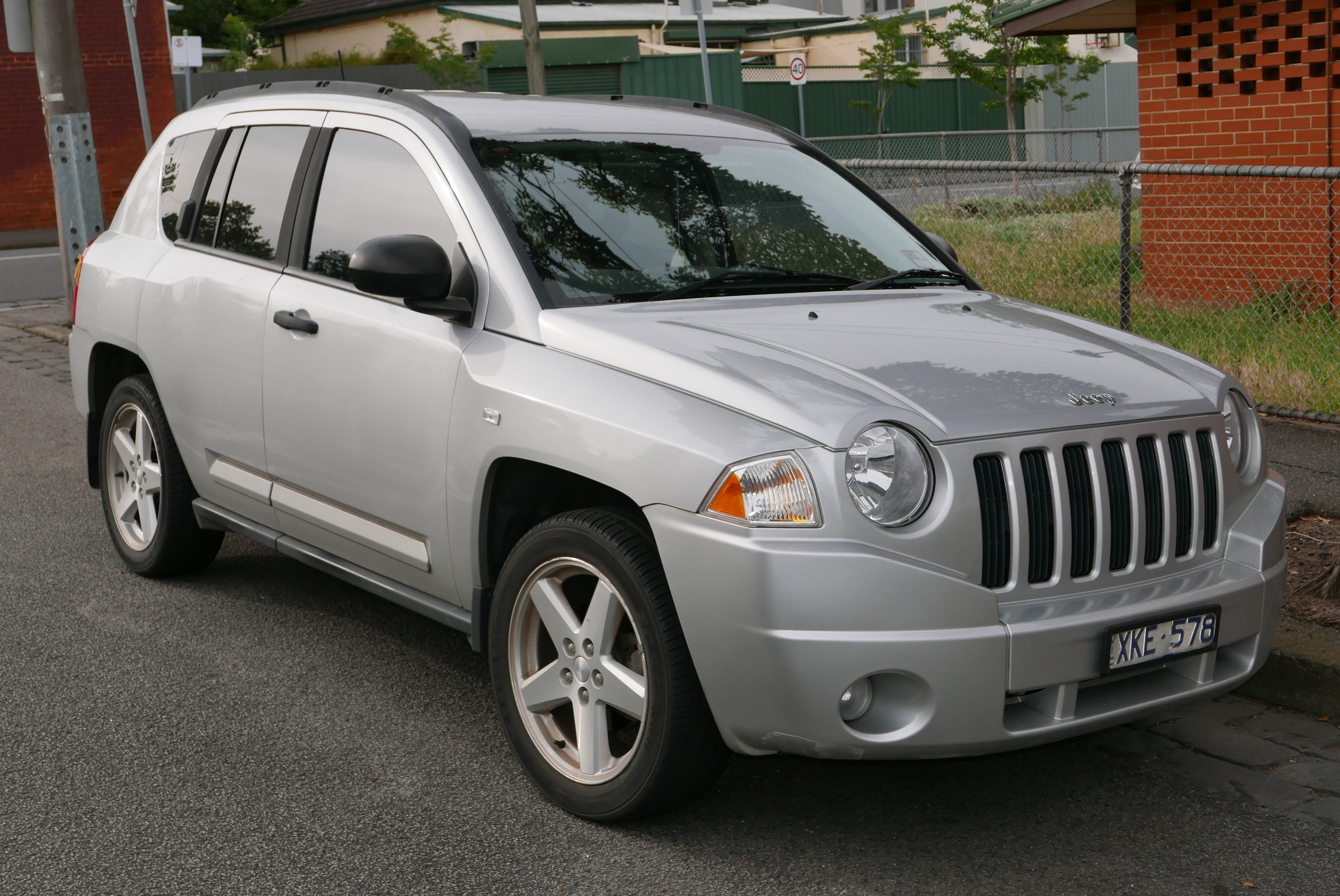
2008 Jeep Compass

The Jeep Compass was one of Jeep's first attempts to produce a compact crossover SUV, but it was criticized for poor design, poor quality, and the absence of good off-road capabilities, because it was largely based on the Dodge Caliber compact car. Thus, the Compass was the first Jeep with front-wheel drive and independent suspension, making it the first Jeep to be designed primarily for good road performance. The Truth About Cars ranked the car second in its "Ten Worst Automobiles Today Award (TWAT)" list in 2006, saying,

In this horror story, Dr. Frankenstein (played by the mustache-twirling Doktor Z) grafts round headlights and a seven-slot grill onto the face of a mediocre high-riding sedan (a.k.a. the Dodge Caliber). He throws the switch and an ugly, gangly, underpowered, mud-aversive half-breed staggers into the light, turning all who see it– or God forbid buy it– into grotesque, bobble-headed morons. The Compass stomps all over Jeep's reputation as America's purveyor of authentic off-road vehicles. It's time to get out your pitchforks.

Best Life named the Compass the worst car of the 21st century in 2018, saying,

This abomination was an affront to die-hard Jeep lovers everywhere. It looked like an as-seen-on-TV plastic appliance that one buys in a late-night stupor and condemns to the pantry for the rest of existence. Plus, in the ultimate insult to Jeepsters, this vehicle had no off-road prowess (to say nothing of how it handled on-road).

Jalopnik headlined a 2016 article about the arrival of the second generation with "Burn In Hell, Jeep Compass", saying,

A brand new Jeep Compass is upon us, meaning the old one— a universally derided conglomerate of hard plastics, weak suspension parts and just general automotive incompetence—is on its way out. Thank god. ... even though you could say the Compass paved the way for the fairly-decent new Cherokee and Renegade, the history books won't be kind to the Mitsubishi GS-based crossover. Though many early reviews weren't horrible—in part because the automotive climate in the U.S. in 2006 dulled many journalists' senses into thinking terrible hard interiors, poor NVH and uninspired handling were acceptable, and because fawning early reviews remain common in the sycophantic world of auto writing—within a few years, the Compass became the laughing stock of the industry.

=== Chrysler Sebring (2007–2010) ===
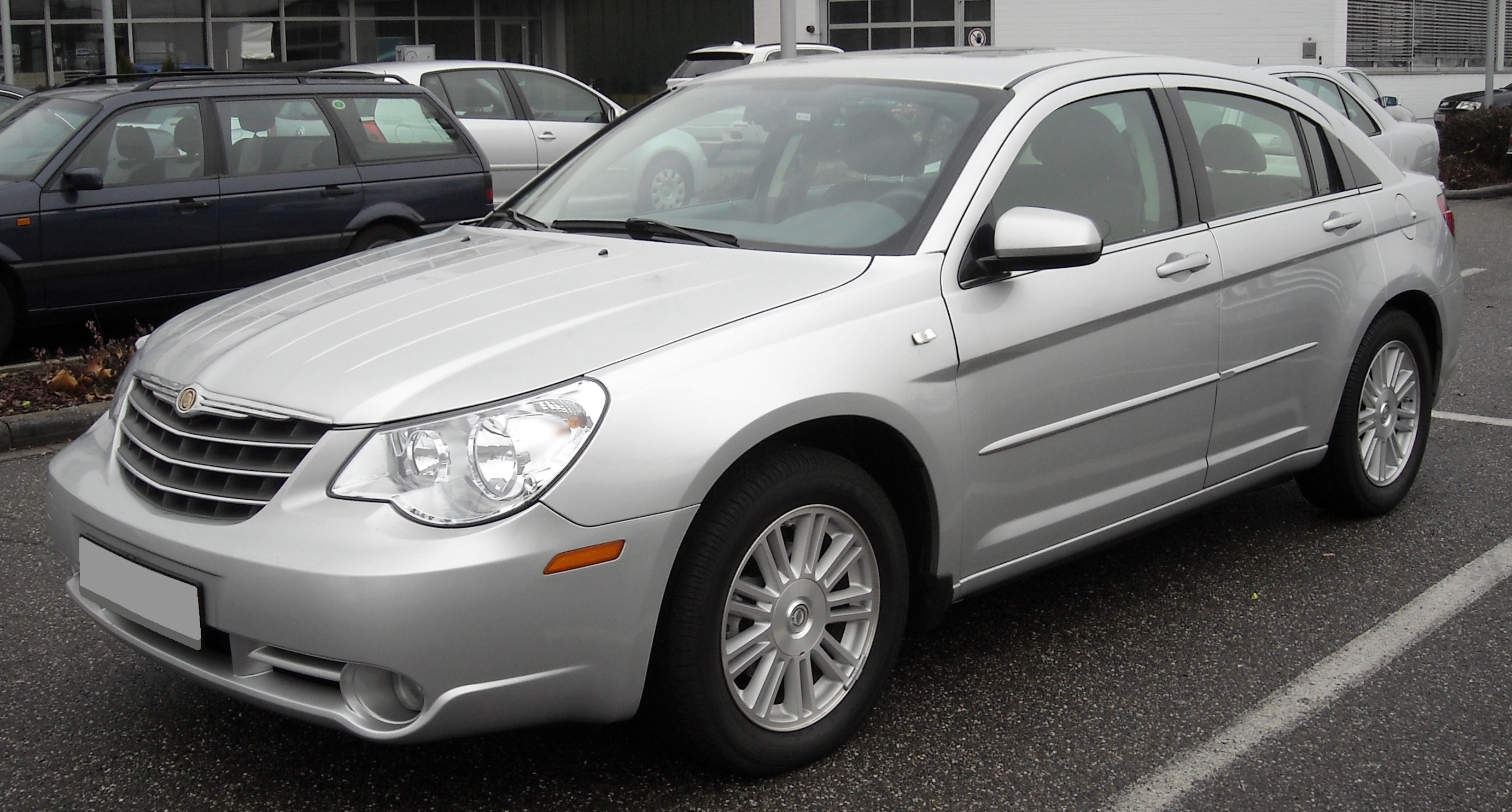
Chrysler Sebring

The 2007 Chrysler Sebring met with derision from critics upon launch. When The Truth About Cars reviewed the Sebring in late 2006, writer Jonny Lieberman criticized it harshly and said,

I don't get it. DCX must be trying to kill Chrysler. ... Do I sound insane? Paranoid? Delusional? I cannot think of another remotely credible reason why any carmaker, knowing full well that the Camry and Accord are out there, would bring such a tired dog to market. Seriously, how profitable can rental cars be?

The Truth About Cars subsequently included the Sebring on its 2007 and 2008 lists of the worst cars on the market. In a 2007 comparison test, Car and Driver ranked the Chrysler Sebring last, stating,

Everyone who climbed aboard the Sebring felt it was aimed at buyers for which Buicks had become too racy" and that the interior looked like it had been "constructed from the parts of five different cars to look like the lobby of the Chrysler Building.

In a later review, Car and Driver said,

However, the Sebring is one of the least appealing cars in its class, finishing last in a recent Car and Driver comparison test of four-cylinder mid-size sedans. The engines are not especially refined, the handling and the ride are mediocre, and the interior quality is substandard. It doesn't even look that good, which is disappointing given that Chrysler used to have a reputation for excellent styling, not to mention the Sebring's handsome predecessor.

Jeremy Clarkson reviewed the Sebring convertible in 2008, saying that it was "the worst car in the world today". He continued, "All [the powertrain] did was convert fuel into noise"; it had "the overwhelming sense from everything you touched that it had been built by someone who was being deliberately stupid or who was four years old"; and to buy a Sebring convertible over a Volkswagen Eos a person would have to be "so window-lickingly insane that you'd be banned from handling anything other than crayons."

Jalopnik in 2009 listed the 2007 Sebring as one of the 10 worst cars built in the 2000s:

Hailed at its launch as the cornerstone of Chrysler's post-300 renaissance; ended up a thorough disappointment and the closest thing to an Aztek-like styling catastrophe seen in years. The Sebring's spec sheet is impressive — it sports things like standard side-curtain air bags, a six-speed automatic, and an available hard-drive-equipped stereo — but it can't overcome the car's substantial faults.

In a separate article, Jalopnik singled out the Sebring and named it the worst car of the decade:

We're going to get this out of the way right off the bat and say yes, the second-generation Chrysler Sebring is the worst car of the decade because it's a car so awful we can't believe anyone, anywhere is still buying them.

Following a major refresh of the Sebring for the 2011 model year, the car was renamed the Chrysler 200 because of the significantly negative brand equity around the "Sebring" name.

=== Dodge Caliber (2007–2012) ===
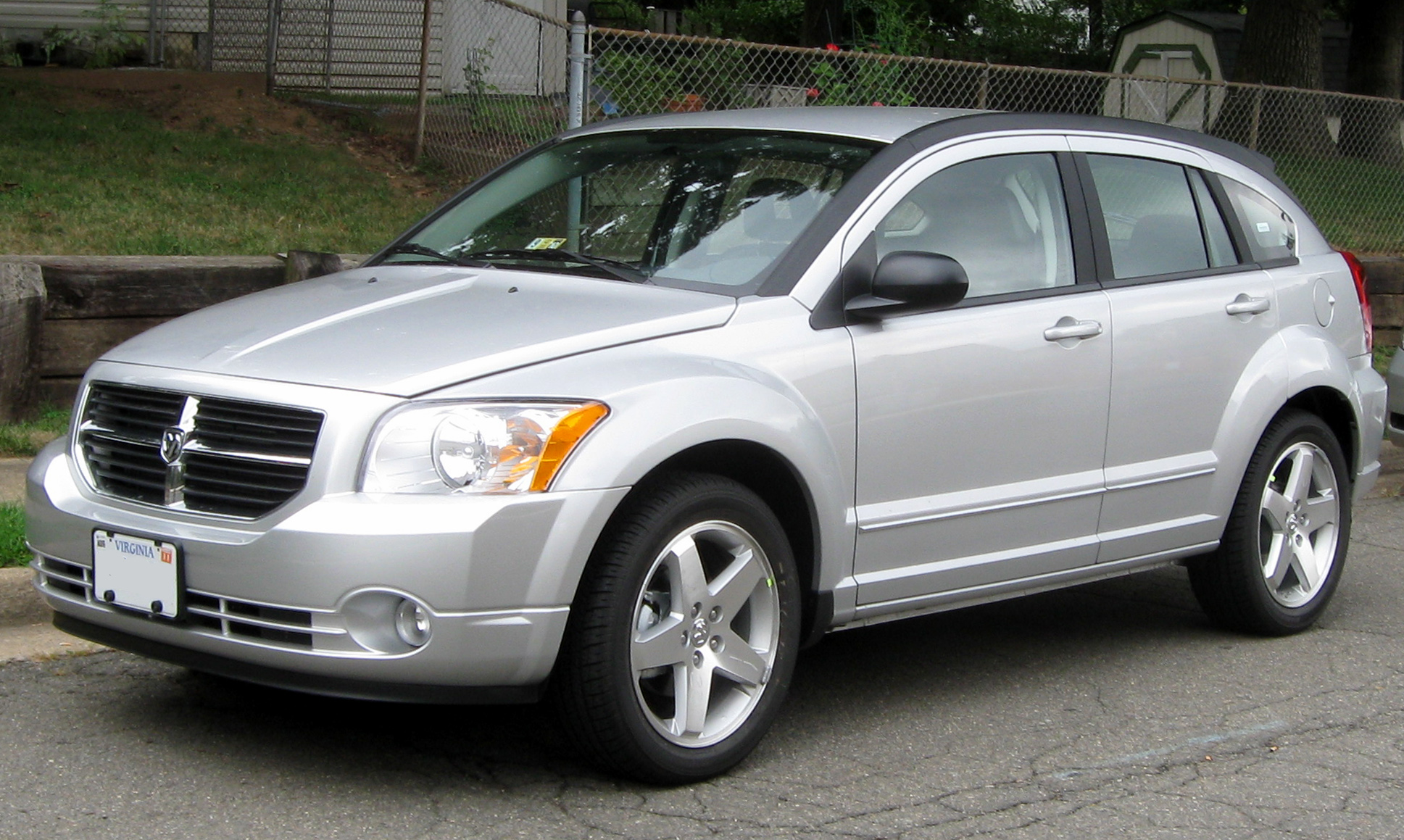
Dodge Caliber

The Dodge Caliber, a compact hatchback released for the 2007 model year to replace the critically acclaimed and popular Dodge Neon, was less successful in the marketplace. Reasons included its bad styling, cheap and poorly made interior, poor performance, and unrefined power trains. The Truth About Cars strongly criticized the Caliber across multiple reviews, stating that "the Caliber shows that bad Detroit habits are hard to break, firing blanks in this latest battle of the econobox wars" and that "Despite an independent rear suspension, the car displays all the grace of a sumo wrestler on figure skates." In another review, The Truth about Cars concluded with, "If DCX is to rally its troops and remain competitive in these fuel-conscious times, they'll have to do better than this." The blog subsequently named the Caliber as one of its "Ten Worst Autos of 2008"; in a review of the updated 2010 model, the blog said that the Caliber is "a vehicle that a lot of folks would justifiably consider to be a loser car from a loser car company." Car and Driver placed the Caliber second to last in a 2007 comparison test of entry-level cars, claiming that the Caliber handled poorly and felt underdeveloped, and noting that "as our test wore on, the Caliber wore thin".

In a subsequent review of the higher-tier Caliber R/T, Car and Driver stated that "the Caliber isn't all that good." ConsumerGuide listed the Caliber as one of the worst cars of the past 10 years, with the writer describing it as "the loudest, crudest, and cheapest-feeling compact car I may have ever driven." In 2009, Jalopnik listed the Caliber as one of the worst cars of the 2000s, stating, "It's a thoroughly depressing, indifferently built car, the kind of vehicle that Detroit needs to quit building, and quit building now." Jalopnik also noted that the Honda Ridgeline pickup truck generated better skidpad numbers and that even Chrysler engineers viewed the Caliber with disdain. In 2016, Jalopnik published an article about taking a road trip in a Caliber titled "Three Hours Of Terror In One Of The Worst Cars Sold In The U.S. This Millennium"; this article described the Caliber as "a rolling symbol of American industrial decline". Top Gear magazine ranked the Caliber as the third-worst car of the past 20 years, describing it as "kind of like Kid Rock in car form, although marginally less annoying". Edmunds named the Caliber SRT-4 as the 42nd worst car of all time, claiming that it was "too big and too ugly" to be a desirable performance car.

=== Dodge Nitro (2007–2012) ===
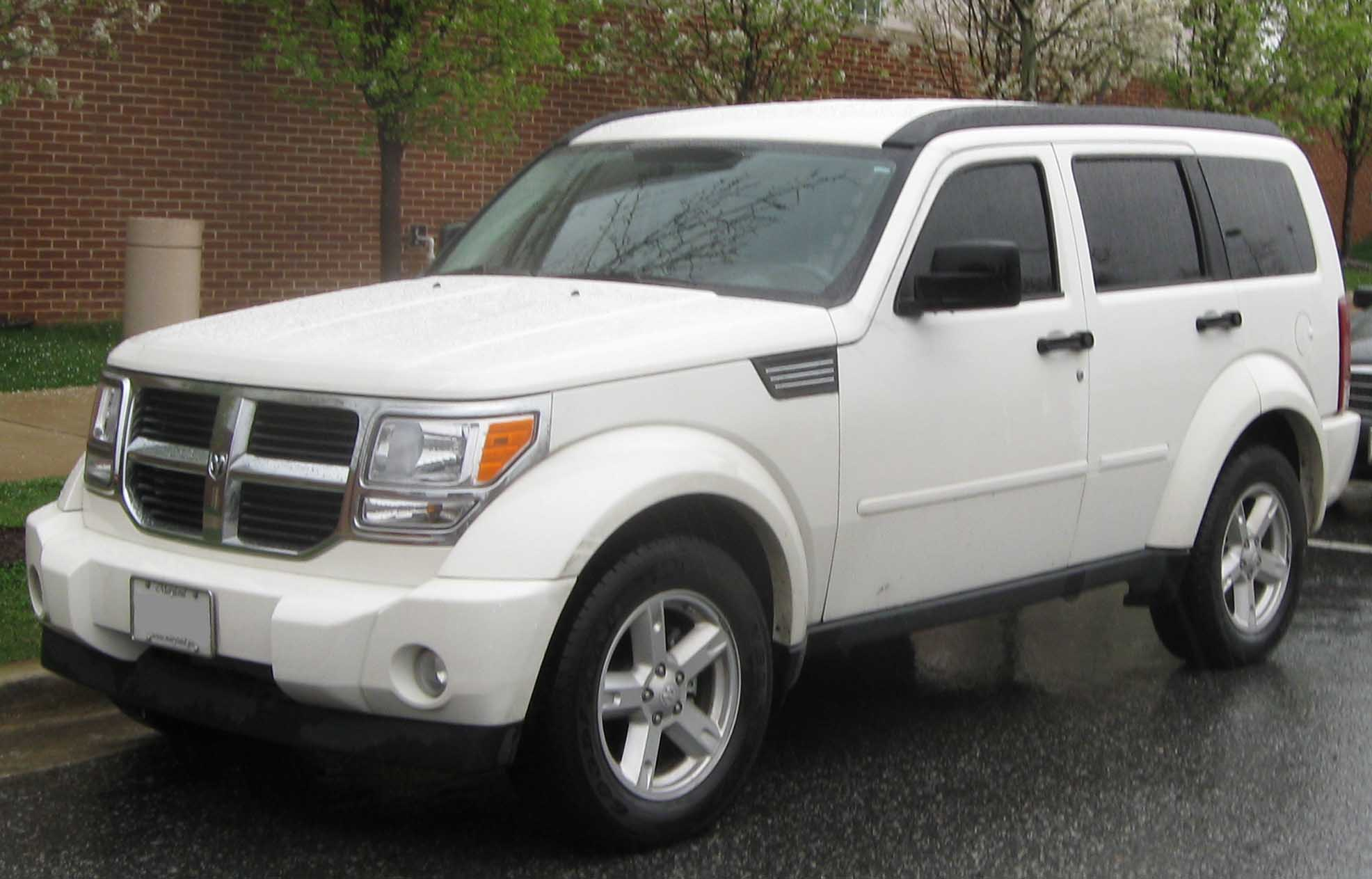
Dodge Nitro

The Dodge Nitro, released in 2007, was a badge-engineered variant of the Jeep Liberty with most of the off-road equipment removed. Consumer Reports stated that the Nitro's cramped interior and sluggish engine made it "a chore to drive", and the organization could not name a single redeeming quality that the car possessed. Forbes subsequently named the Nitro one of the worst cars on the market in 2007. The Truth About Cars listed the Nitro as one of the 10 worst cars of 2008, saying of it,

Do you think [the French] care that we put panties on a few prisoners' heads? No, they abhor our conspicuous consumption and tough-guy dress-up routines. To show them we have a sense of humor, we should send them the Dodge Nitro: a slow, cramped, artless knockoff of a HUMMER H2.

ConsumerGuide named the Nitro one of "The Worst Cars of the Past Ten Years":

Desperate to compete in the exploding crossover market, Dodge tapped Jeep for a vehicle it could restyle and make its own. The result was the Nitro, an SUV that inherited all of its host vehicle's flaws without the promise of serious off-road capability.

ReDriven ranked the Nitro second on its list of "The 5 Worst Cars You Can Buy Today", describing it as "utter crap" with "horrifically shoddy build quality" while raising questions about service and parts, given that the Dodge brand no longer did business in Australia. The article concluded, "The only viable reason for buying a Dodge Nitro is [to utilize it for scrap metal]."

=== Hyundai i10 (2007–2015) ===
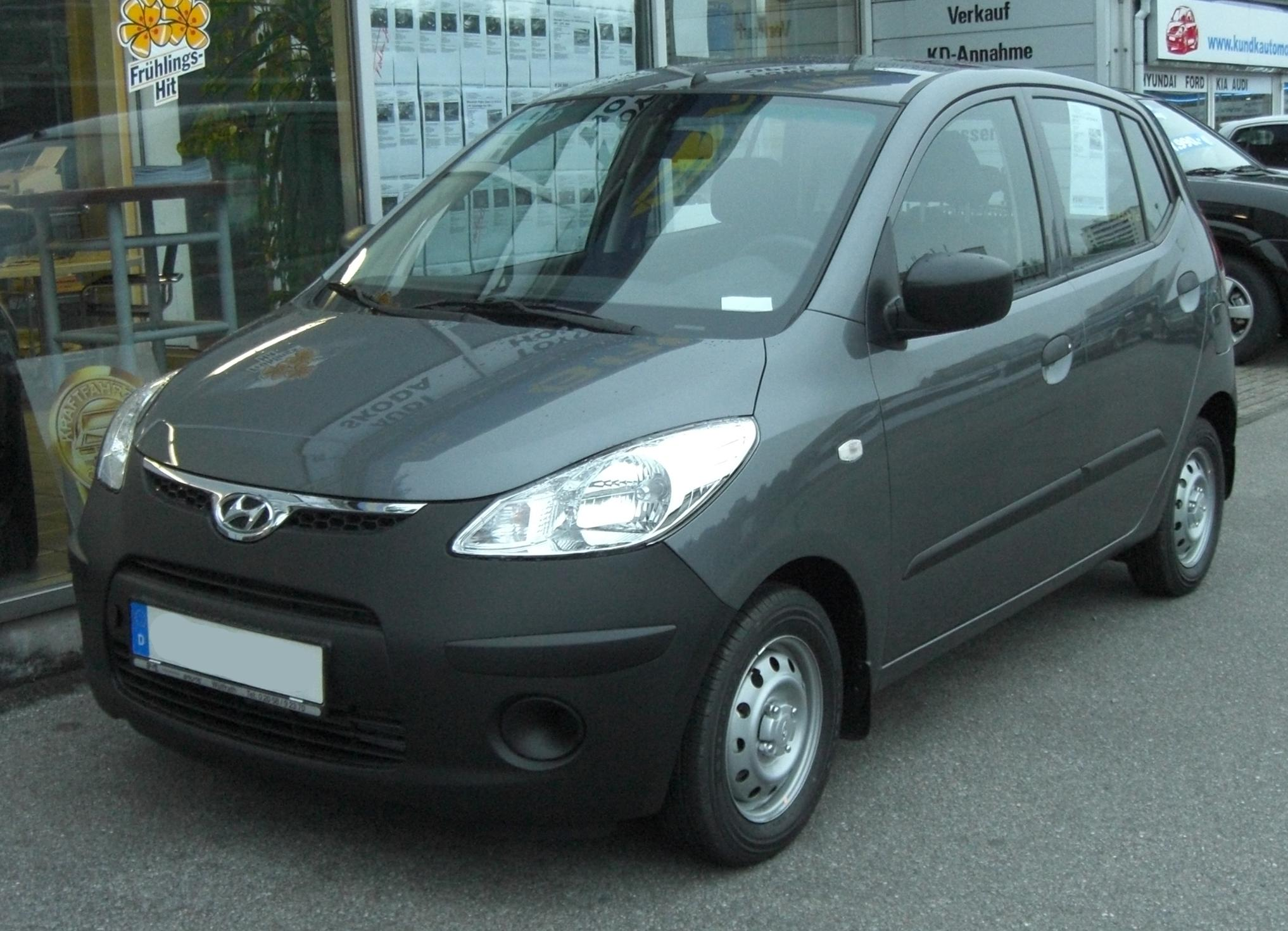
First-generation Hyundai I10

The Hyundai i10 was introduced in 2007 as the successor to the Hyundai Atos. This car has received a strongly negative response from the press. CarGuide named it one of "The Worst Cars of the Past Ten Years":

Power from the 3-cylinder engine is predictably limited, but fuel economy is the more troubling issue. Since it weighs just 2039 pounds (925 kg) and wields just 65 horsepower, one would assume the tiny i10 would see 50 mpg (21 km per liter) on a regular basis. Sadly, in CarGuide testing, we never broke 39 mpg (17 km per liter).

Janusz named the i10 one of the worst cars of the decade, stating that,

For a small little grandma it's good unless she doesn't have legs or eyes. Cabin too cramped even for a baby, while the interior plastics too cheap and will degrade after 5 years, while the exterior is impossible to look at.

Autochat included the I10 on its list of "The 10 Dumbest Cars of All Time": "For people who like to park, the Hyundai i10 is the perfect vehicle. However, if you have to drive anywhere, it won't be a fun trip." CarGuide strongly criticized the i10 and stated in a 2014 video that the i10 is one of the worst cars ever made. Kelihers.com ranked the i10 the 36th worst car of all time.

== 2010s ==
=== Nissan Juke (first generation) (2010–2019) ===
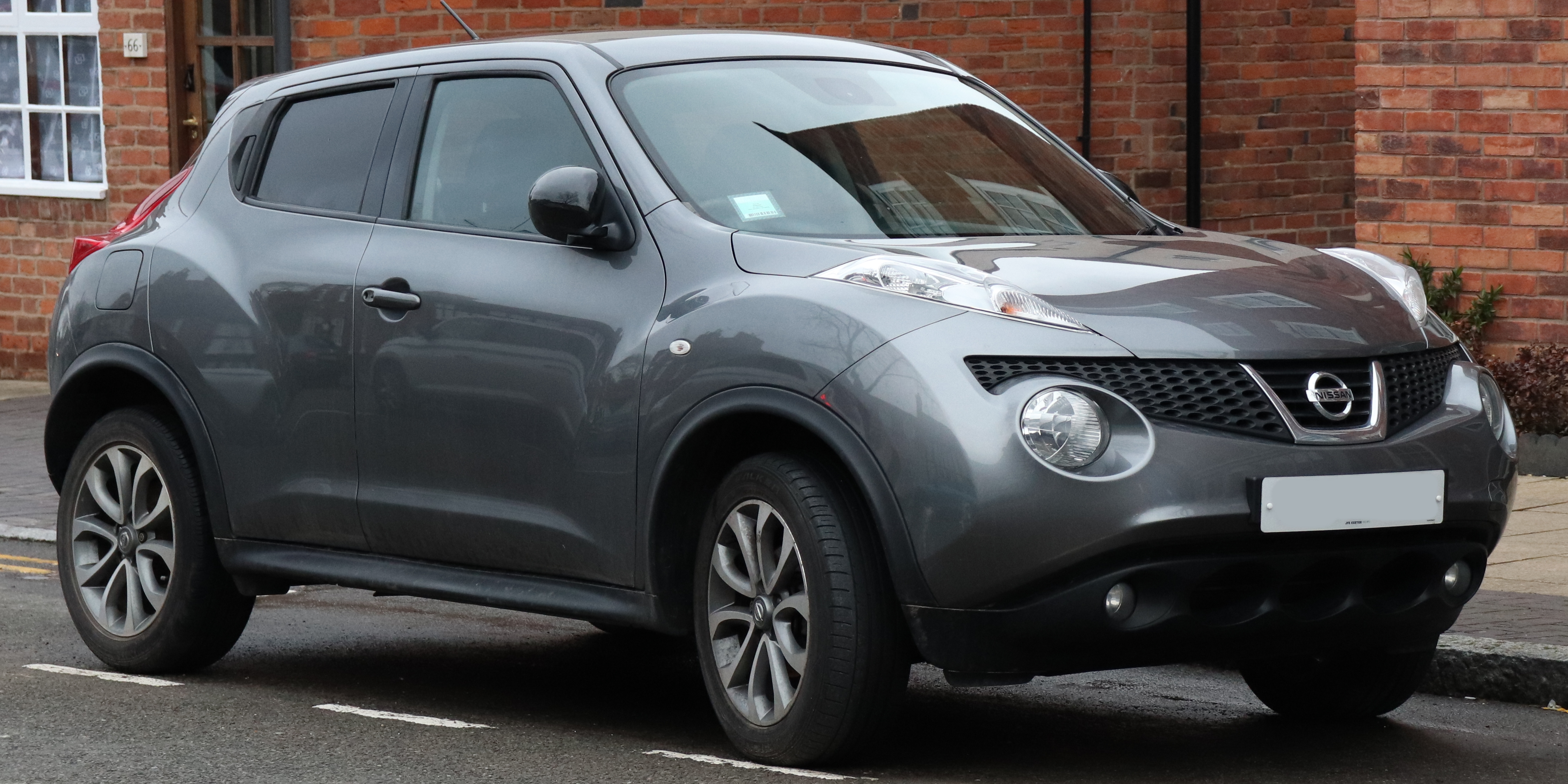
Nissan Juke

The Nissan Juke is a subcompact crossover SUV. Despite being a success for Nissan in Europe, where the Juke was reported to be the company's second best-selling car behind the Qashqai in 2015, the Juke received much criticism for its reliability, practicality, and appearance. The first-generation Juke had several recalls in response to various faults, and some common issues were costly to repair. Reported issues include continuously variable transmission (CVT) gearbox failures, turbocharger failures, fuel leaks, oxygen sensor problems, battery issues, and stretched timing chains. The consumer choice organization Which? reported that diesel versions of the first-generation Juke had a 20% failure rate of certain fuel system components, compared to a 3.45% fault average in all 3–8-year-old diesel cars included in the organization's survey.

Much of the criticism around the Juke was focused on its unusual exterior styling. HotCars ranked the Juke among its list of 'Ugliest New Cars On Sale In 2021', commenting, "The frog-shaped Nissan Juke is undoubtedly not a very pleasant sight to keep your eyes on for long". In a survey, CarThrottle found that the Juke was ranked among 'The Top 10 Ugliest Cars Ever Made'. Time commented, "... the Nissan Juke has quickly ascended to the top of many automotive enthusiast lists. Not in terms of reliability or fuel economy or value—but for sheer ugliness" in its article "Nissan's Ugly Little SUV: Now Uglier Than Ever". In terms of practicality, the Juke was criticized for its lack of space and poor ergonomics despite its relatively large size. Commenting on both the Juke's appearance and its practicality, Heycar said, "The old Nissan Juke sold by the bucketload despite having looks only a mother could love and an interior like a reverse Tardis." Particular attention was paid to the poor trunk space, the lack of headroom for rear passengers, and the inability of the steering column to extend.

More generalized criticism was leveled at the Juke as well. The Telegraph referred to the first-generation Juke as 'the worst car Nissan made'. The television series The Grand Tour, during its end-of-year awards in 2017, named one of its awards the 'Nissan Juke Award for Worst Car of the Year'. After considering a number of cars from various manufacturers, the winner was announced as the Nissan Juke, with Richard Hammond stating, "A deserved award—the judges were particularly impressed with its consistent awfulness. It was awful when it was first launched seven years ago, and it continues to be awful to this day." Hammond was an outspoken critic of the Juke, writing the article "I Hate The Nissan Juke" in 2017.

=== Aston Martin Cygnet (2011–2013) ===
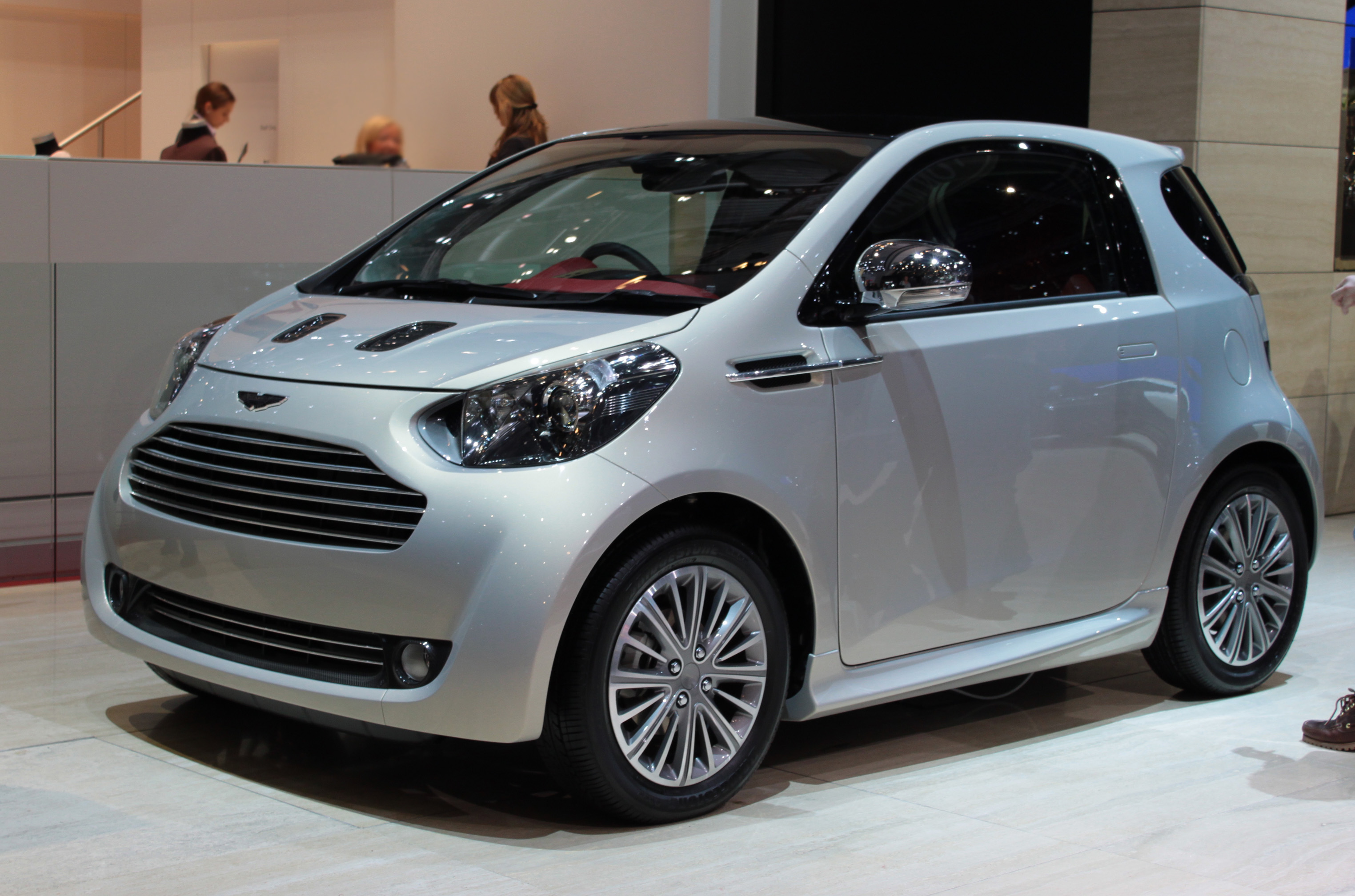
Aston Martin Cygnet

The Aston Martin Cygnet was a rebadged variant of the Toyota/Scion iQ that was marketed by Aston Martin starting with the 2011 model year. The Cygnet was a luxury small car marketed as a second car for wealthy people, which allowed Aston Martin to comply with emissions regulations on fleet averages that the European Union imposed in 2012. The car was largely identical to the iQ, but at £30,000, it cost about three times as much. The Cygnet was discontinued in 2013 because of disastrously low sales, selling 150 units in the UK and about 600 across Europe, against an annual target of 4000. Doug DeMuro called it "the most ridiculous exotic car ever". Top Gear included the car in its "Fail of the century" series, calling it:

An exercise in badge engineering with the cynical aim of lowering Aston's average fleet emissions. [...] Problem was, instead of acknowledging the £30k Cygnet's humble underpinnings, Aston instead plumped for the ambitious strategy of 'hoping no one would notice it was a £10k Toyota in fancy dress'.

Top Car News called it "The worst Aston Martin ever made". The Oxford Mail included the car in its "THE WORST CARS EVAH!" series, saying,

It seems the world has gone mad — one of the most iconic British motoring marques has suddenly decided to make a micro-car that owes more to Dinky toys than engineering excellence. [...] Based on the ridiculous Toyota IQ rollerskate, it's just about big enough to squeeze in one of Daniel Craig's biceps. More like 002 and a bit than 007.

=== Nissan Murano CrossCabriolet (2011–2014) ===
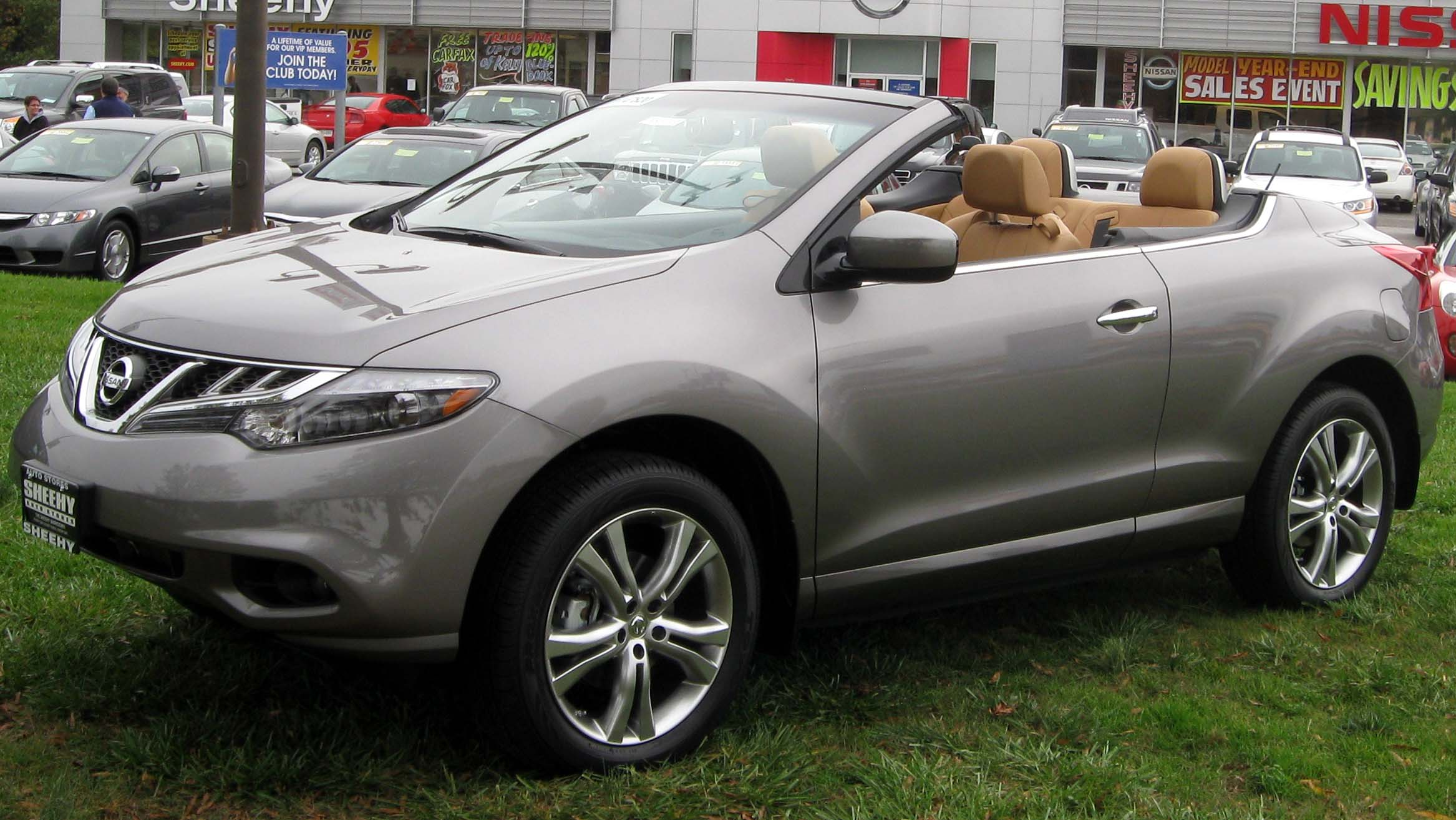
Nissan Murano CrossCabriolet

The Nissan Murano CrossCabriolet was a vehicle marketed as "the world's first all-wheel drive crossover convertible". While the regular Murano received generally positive reviews, the CrossCabriolet was strongly criticized by automotive critics and journalists, and it was reported to be the most disliked car of 2011.

In addition, a staff member of the website The Car Connection called the CrossCabriolet a "head-scratcher" with "some strange proportions, to put it kindly". Doug DeMuro described the car as ugly, slow, sloppy around corners and shaky over bumps, expensive, impractical, and compromised. One staff member from Motor Trend found the car to be "the most stupid vehicle of 2011", criticizing its structural rigidity, ride height, styling, efficiency, practicality, and reason for existing. Car and Driver found it "too compromised to be called great". Thorn Taylor from MotorBiscuit strongly criticized the car, praising only its comfort, but described it as a Murano without any of the positive qualities. James Riswick from Edmunds commented, "What on Earth are they thinking?"; he added that he was "looking for seven-foot furry creature riding shotgun". Dan Neil of The Wall Street Journal described the car as "sluggish, wobbly, weird-looking, with a front-end shake that would mix a good daiquiri, crazy-awful. The CrossCabriolet is like a sorbet of mouse scat". Jay Traugott from CarBuzz strongly criticized the car, calling it "terrible in so many ways".

=== Dodge Dart (2012–2016) ===
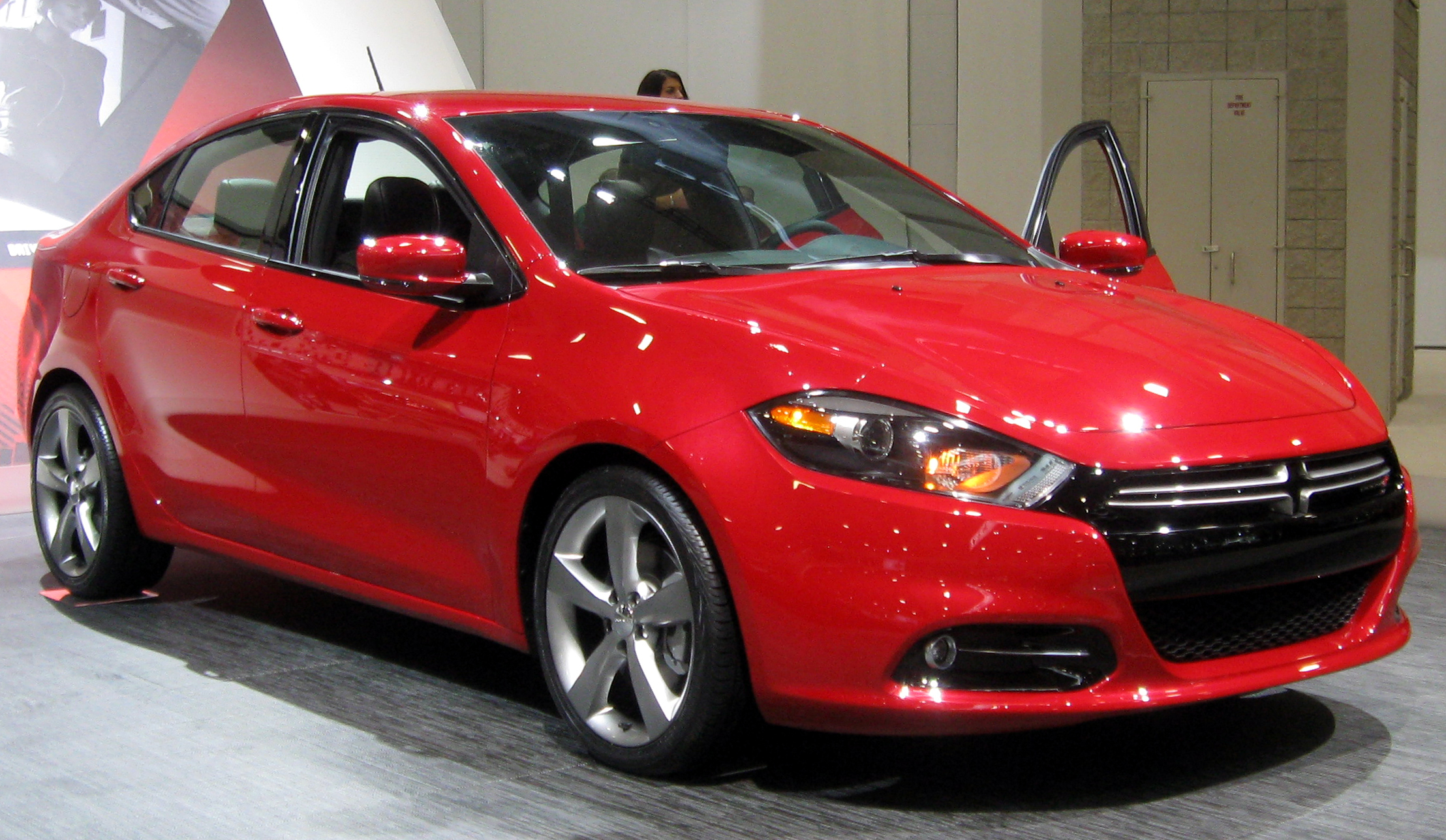
2013 Dodge Dart

The Dodge Dart is a subcompact sedan that was first announced in 2011 as Dodge's new small sedan, with sales beginning in June 2012. The car was poorly received for several reasons: its automatic transmission issues; underpowered engines, with the 1.4L turbocharged engine being prone to excessive oil consumption; and stalling and electronics issues.

Consumer Reports rated the Dart poorly, criticizing its issues with the transmission and engine. In a review of the 2015 model, Edmunds praised the car's styling and space, but criticized its underpowered engines and poor reliability. The Dart was discontinued in 2016 along with its sibling, the Chrysler 200, because of weak sales.

=== Mitsubishi Mirage (sixth generation) (2012–present) ===
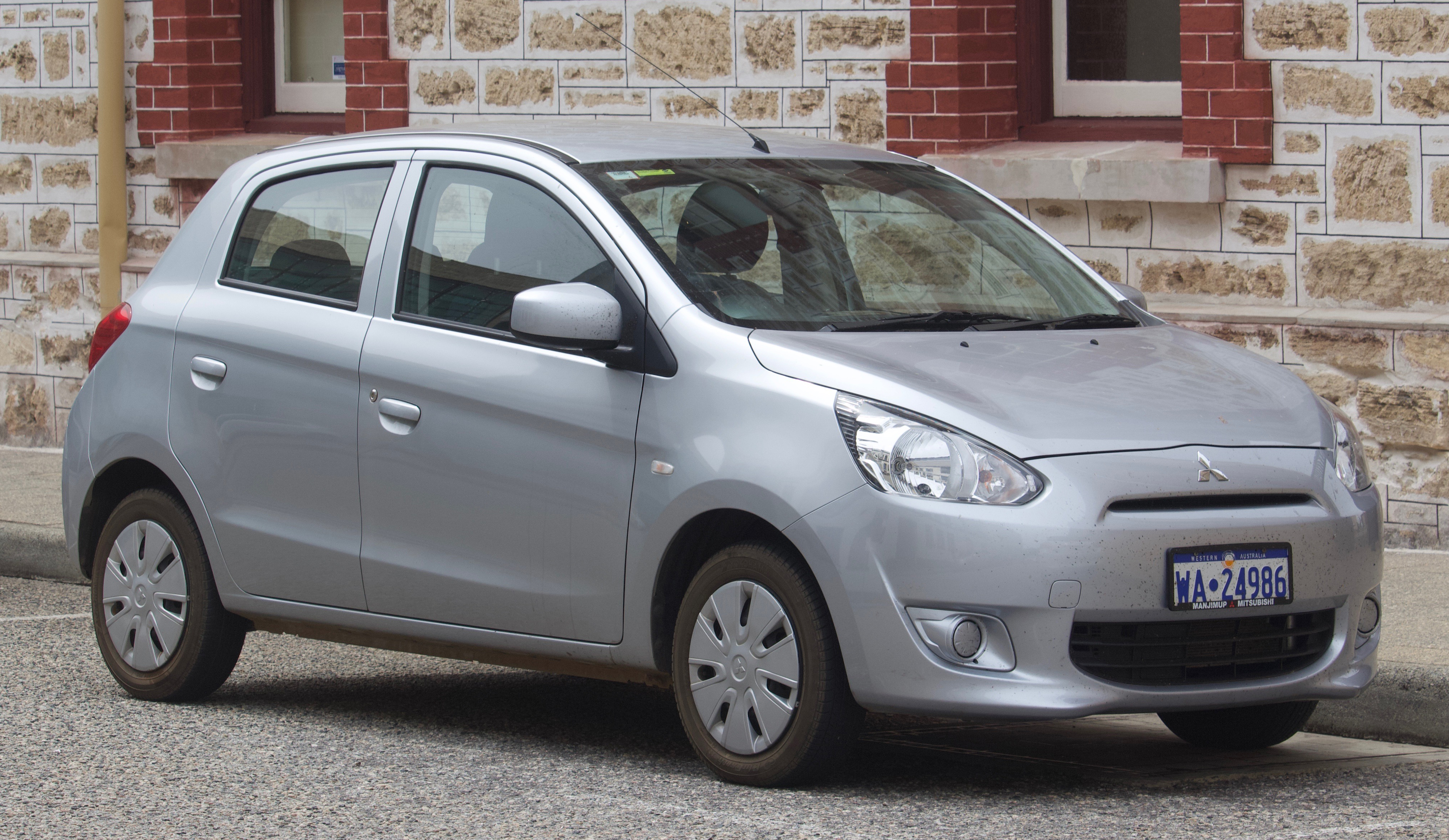
Mitsubishi Mirage (sixth generation)

Although significant work had been put into the latest generation of the long-running Mitsubishi Mirage to make it more aerodynamic and lightweight, the car received mixed reviews, many of which were strongly negative. (The car was named Space Star in some parts of Europe, though it is unrelated to the former minivan having the same name.) Auto Express and Car's Ollie Kew both gave the car a two (out of five) star rating. Matt Jones of Top Gear magazine gave the Mirage an Overall Verdict of 3 out of 10. Sam Wollaston of The Guardian newspaper gave the car a Cool Factor rating of 3 out of 10.

Consumer Reports listed the Mirage among the 10 Worst Cars of 2013, commenting, "handling is clumsy and the interior is reminiscent of early 1980s standards". Top Gear magazine placed the Mirage on its list of "The worst cars you can buy right now", stating, "the Mirage is crap in ways that don't correlate with cost". Similarly, Doug DeMuro described it as "the worst new car you can buy". The Telegraph named the Mirage among the "10 worst cars ever sold in Britain", Forbes ranked the car 11th in its list of "15 new cars to avoid", and TheStreet ranked the car third in its list of the "10 Worst Cars of All Time Revisited".

=== Fisker Karma (2011–2012) and Karma Revero (2017–present) ===
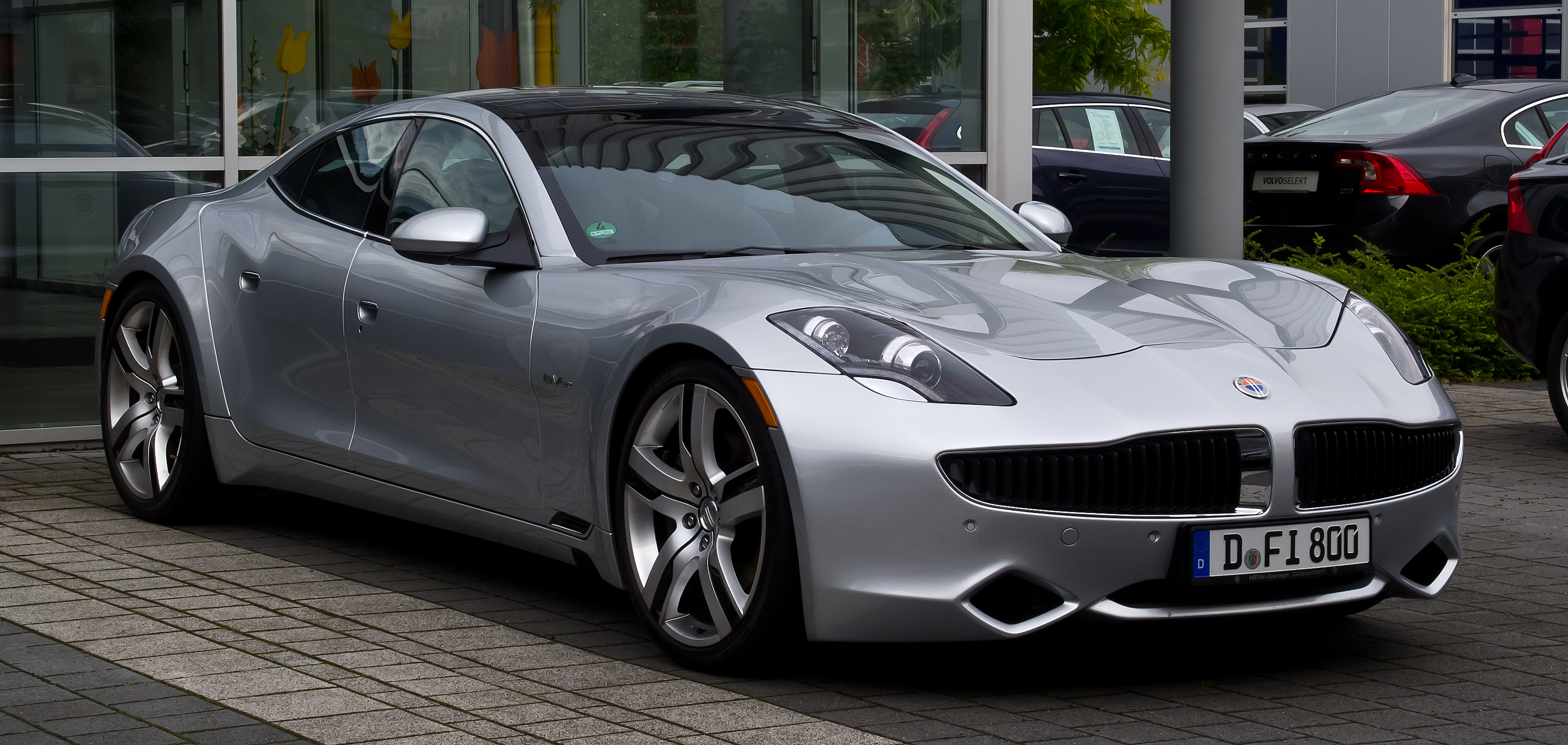
Fisker Karma EcoChic

The Fisker Karma, a plug-in hybrid luxury sedan, was the first and only vehicle produced by Fisker Automotive. The car was designed by Henrik Fisker, who had previously designed notable cars, such as the BMW Z8, the Aston Martin DB9, and the Aston Martin V8 Vantage. The Karma received mixed reviews; while its exterior design was positively commented on, its lack of practicality and other issues have been noted. Consumer Reports claims that its press vehicle failed during a test drive, additionally citing improper battery cell installation and poor fuel economy. After a fire-risk recall and slow sales, Fisker Automotive ended production of the Karma, and the company later filed for bankruptcy in 2013. In 2015, Karma Automotive was created using the corporate assets of Fisker Automotive after its bankruptcy; the new company continued production of the Karma as a new model, known as the Karma Revero. Bloomberg News criticized the Revero for poor driving dynamics and false brand promises.

== 2020s ==
=== VinFast VF8 (2021–present) ===
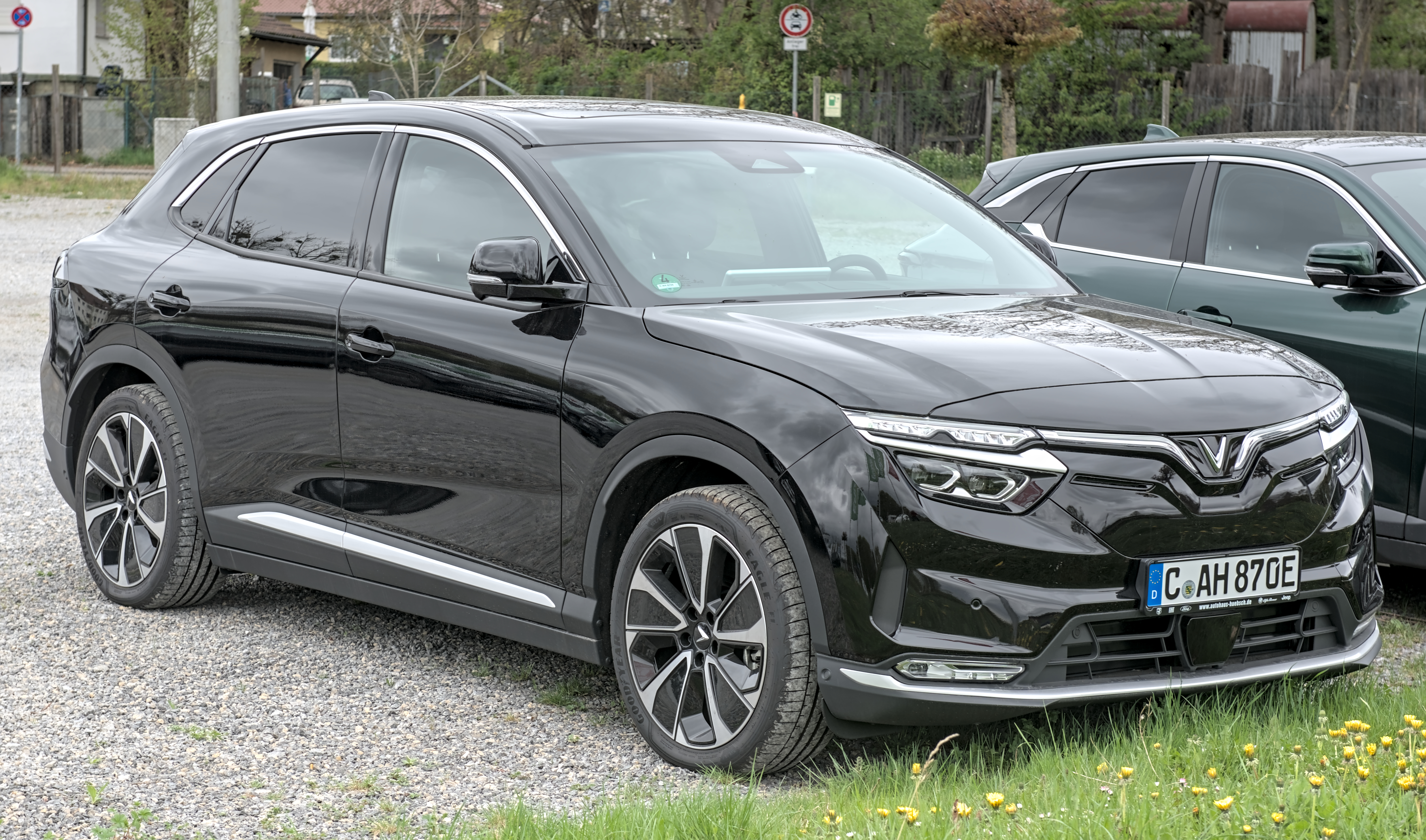
VinFast VF8

The VinFast VF 8 has been almost universally criticized as one of the worst-reviewed vehicles available. A number of well-established and widely followed automotive journalists and car critics gave the VF8 poor reviews on virtually every metric. Among these reviews, the most notable recurring complaints are poor interior/exterior build quality, as well as poor handling, steering, and suspension. Mack Hogan of Drive magazine said about the car,

The VinFast VF8 has the worst body control of any modern car I've ever driven. Over a 90-minute drive, the 5600-lb SUV never stopped bobbing, swaying, and bucking, producing near-constant head-tossing motions. Riding in the passenger seat, I became car sick for the first time in years.

=== BMW iX (2021–present) ===
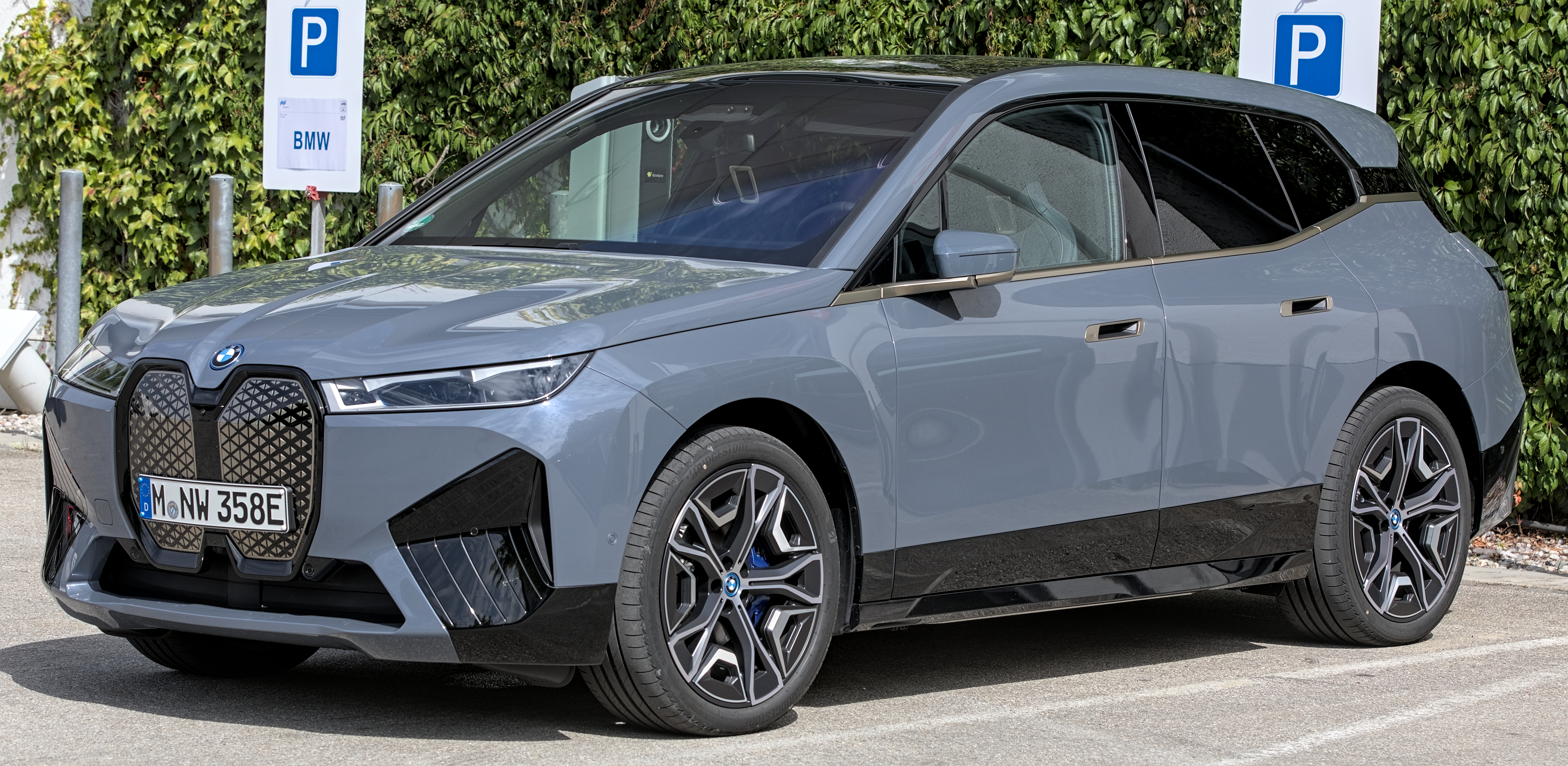
2021 BMW iX

The BMW iX faced a backlash after launch because of its controversial design and its interior, with people calling its futuristic elements "ugly" and "weird".

Jalopnik writer Bob Sorokanich called himself a "BMW iX hater" and described its styling as "incoherent and bland". A 2025 review by Top Gear said that the original arrival of the IX was a "controversy/abject horror" from the internet; the car's design "still divides opinions"; and "You can put lipstick on a pig..." The company Carwow called the car's exterior "polarizing" and "a bit like Marmite—you might love it, you might hate it..." In addition, the iX—along with the BMW i4 and the BMW i7—was recalled because of battery module issues.

=== BMW XM (2022–present) ===
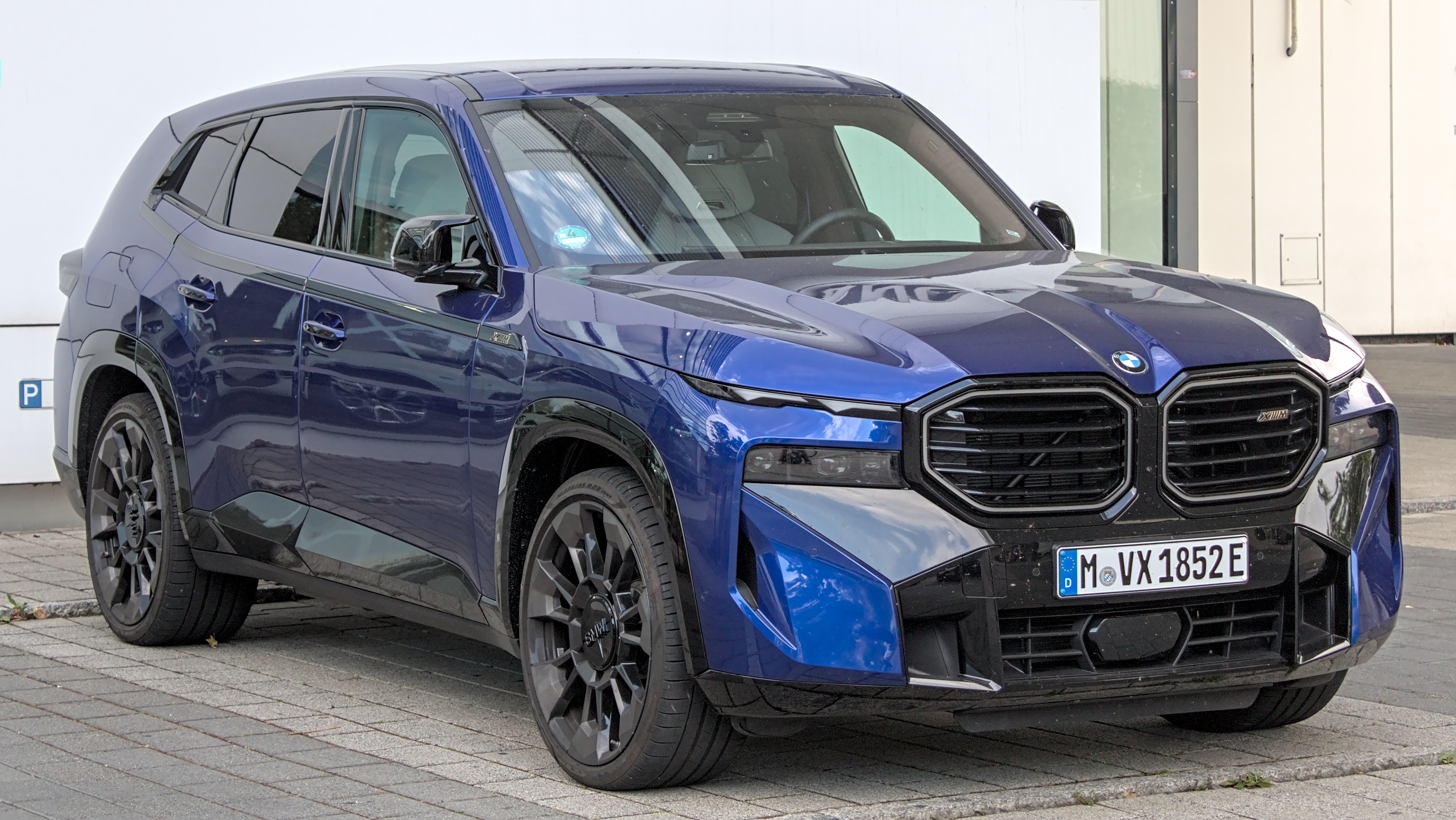
BMW XM

The BMW XM is a crossover SUV positioned as BMW's flagship SUV, with a plug-in hybrid V8 power train. The car was widely criticized, mainly because of its controversial design, weight, and high price; Top Gear described it as "a catastrophe" and "too disconnected and clumsy to drive". Other criticism was directed at the car's poor fuel economy and short electric range. In addition, the car was the worst-selling BMW model in the US, with only 1,974 units sold.

=== Fisker Ocean (2022–2024) ===
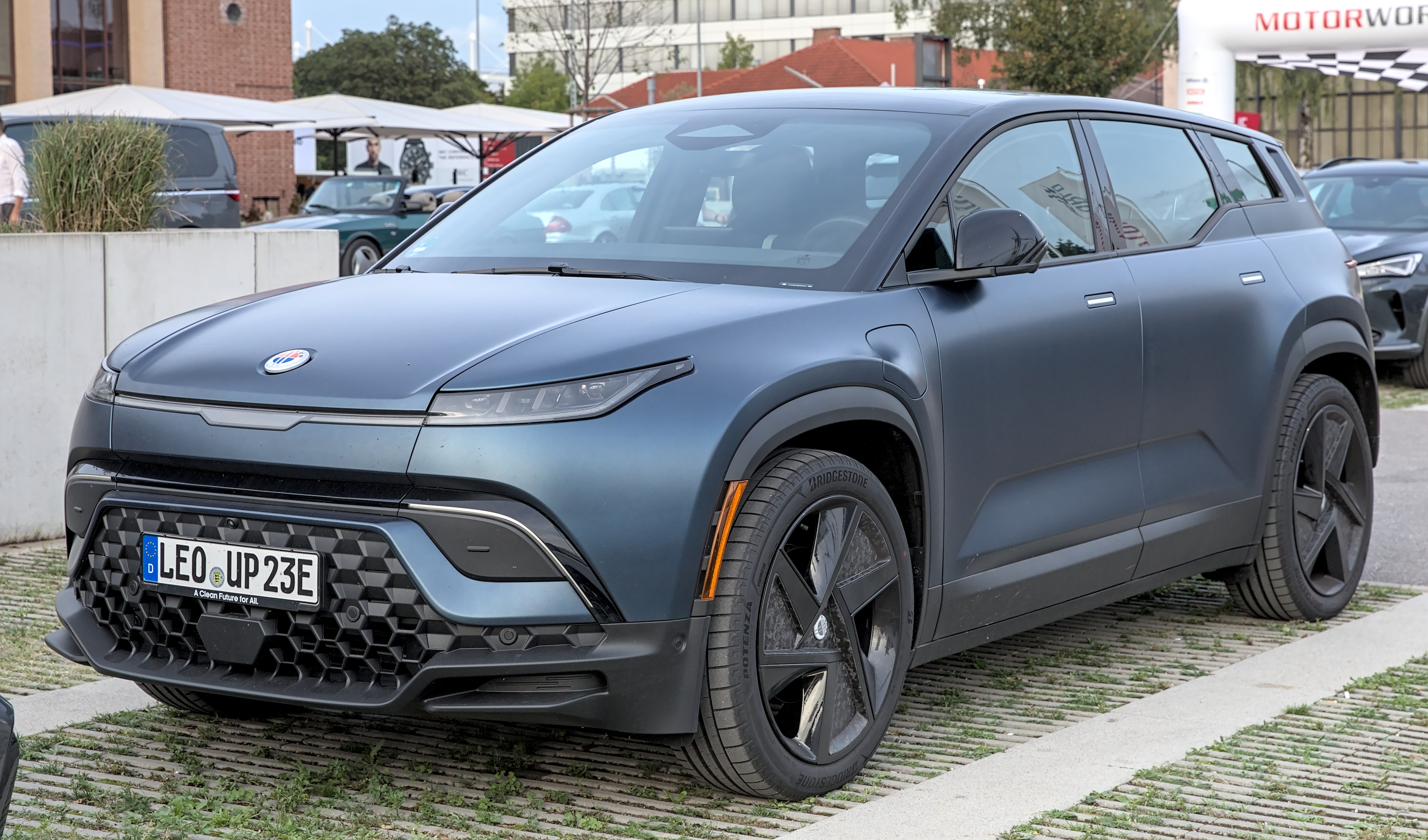
Fisker Ocean

The Fisker Ocean faced significant criticism because of its software bugs present since launch and its overly sensitive brake pedal. Other criticism was directed at its phone pairing and missing features, such as Apple CarPlay and Android Auto.

Marques Brownlee, who reviews technology devices on YouTube, described the Ocean as the "worst car he's ever reviewed"; Consumer Reports said that the Fisker Ocean is "unfinished", "lost at sea", and "one of the strangest cars we've ever encountered", while describing its power train as "bizarrely tuned".

Before filing for liquidation, Fisker delivered nine new Oceans to a dealership in Nottingham, which then left them abandoned on the side of a road, leaving them to rot for more than seven months through winter, with the factory stickers still in place.

=== Tesla Cybertruck (2024–2027) ===
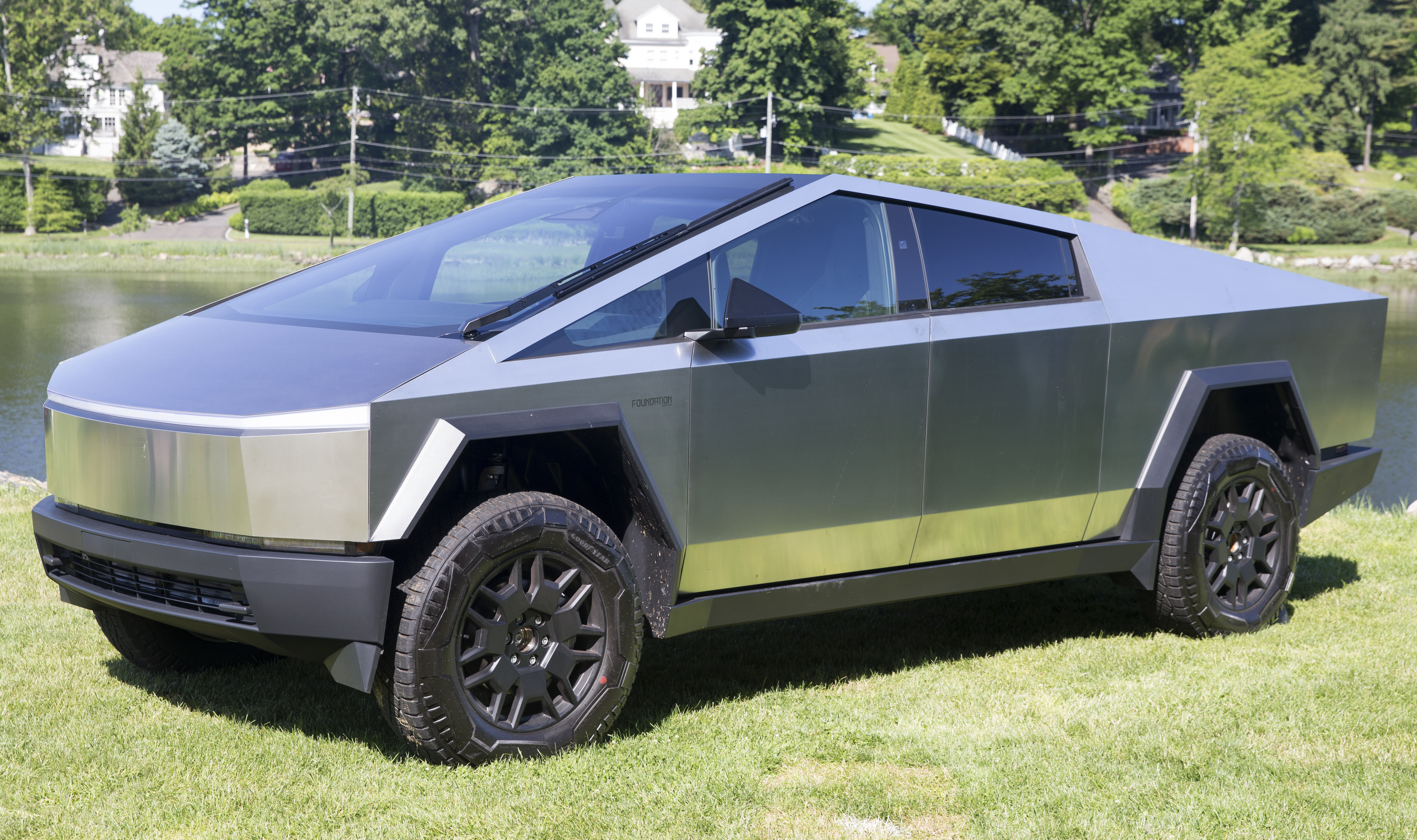
Tesla Cybertruck

The Tesla Cybertruck drew a mixed response at its 2019 unveiling, where its windows smashed when a steel ball was thrown at them during an on-stage demonstration. After release, the truck had several recalls over issues including an accelerator pedal that could come loose and become trapped, trunk bed trim that was not securely attached, and a faulty windshield wiper motor—each of which raised the risk of a crash. With demand lower than Tesla expected after it had sold just under 40,000 units by the end of 2024, Tesla began offering discounts in January 2025 of up to $1,600 on new trucks and about $2,600 on demo units. In February 2025, the company also offered a free vinyl wrap to buyers of the more expensive Foundation Series who took delivery by March 31.

In November 2026, Musk announced on X that Cybertruck production would be wound down around the middle of 2027 to free up capacity for the Cybercab.

=== Ford Capri EV (2024–present) ===
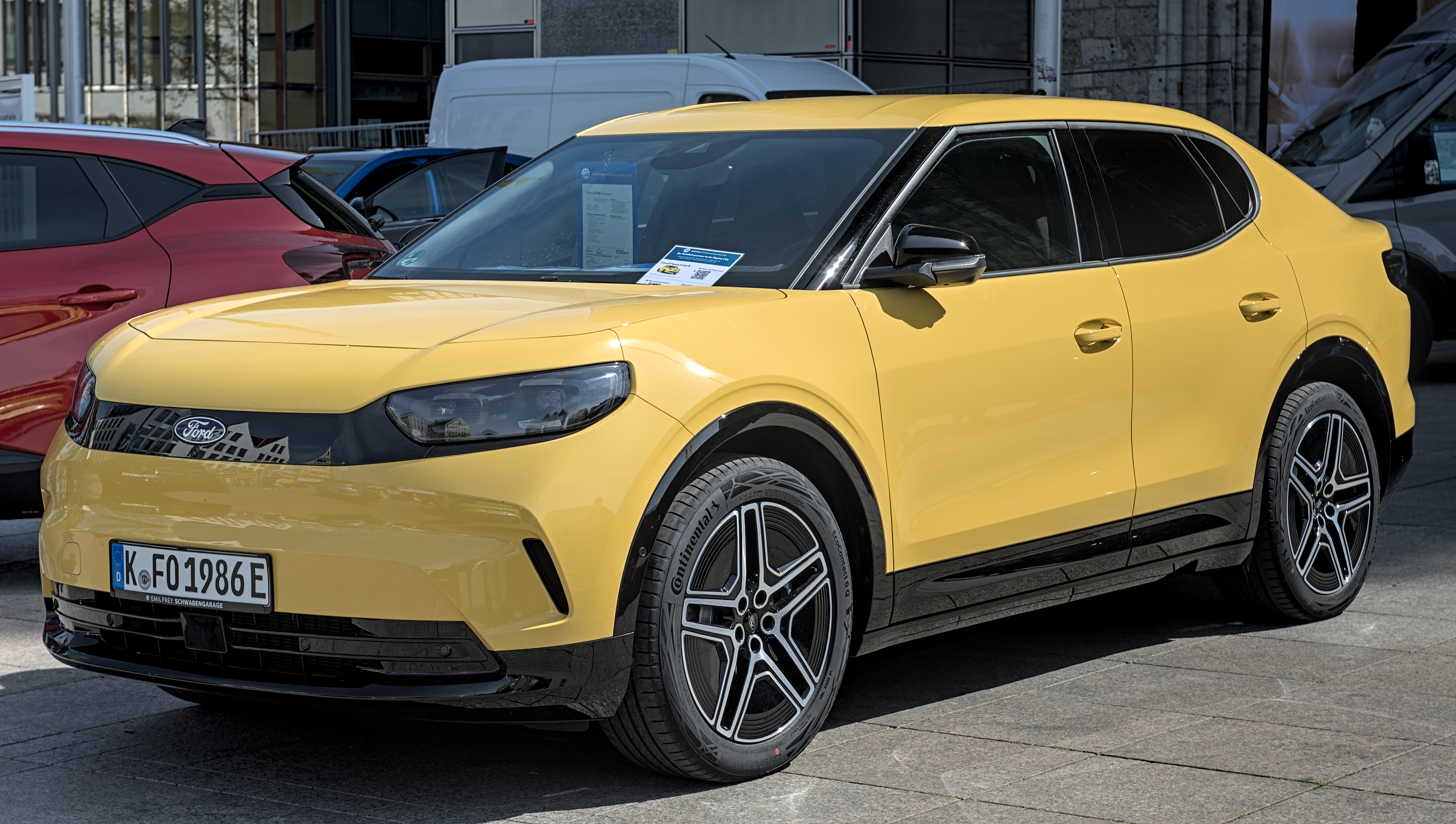
Ford Capri (2024)

The original Ford Capri was a sporty fastback coupe produced between 1968 and 1986 by Ford of Europe, and the car was the European equivalent of the Ford Mustang. By contrast, the Ford Capri EV (electric vehicle) is an electric SUV, a fundamentally different type of car that shares almost nothing with its namesake except some minor references in the design. This followed a trend of Ford reviving the model names of various older cars for new SUVs and crossovers, regardless of how dissimilar the original model was to an SUV's body style. Other examples include the Mustang Mach-E and the Puma.

After the new Capri EV was unveiled in 2024, public reaction was overwhelmingly negative toward reusing the Capri name for a badge-engineered SUV built on Volkswagen's MEB platform. In the article "We react to the reborn Capri: Ford or fraud?", Car's Director of Content Tim Pollard said, "The dusting-down of the Capri badge for another me-too electric crossover will fuel the argument that car makers are creatively bankrupt". The backlash was extreme in the UK, where the original Capri was highly regarded. Writing for the website The Autopian, Lewin Day wrote, "... as far as the Brits are concerned, Ford has done something unforgivable".

The criticism of reusing the Capri name overshadowed much of the otherwise positive road-test reviews of the car itself. Car's road test concluded,

The link between the old and new Capri is just too tenuous for a car that really has minimal hint of sportiness about it. The fact Ford channels its line that it has 'resurrected an icon' makes it all the harder to get on board with.

Demand for the new model was initially low; this caused Ford to reduce production at its Cologne plant, where the car is produced along with the Explorer, in November 2024.

=== Ferrari Luce (2026) ===
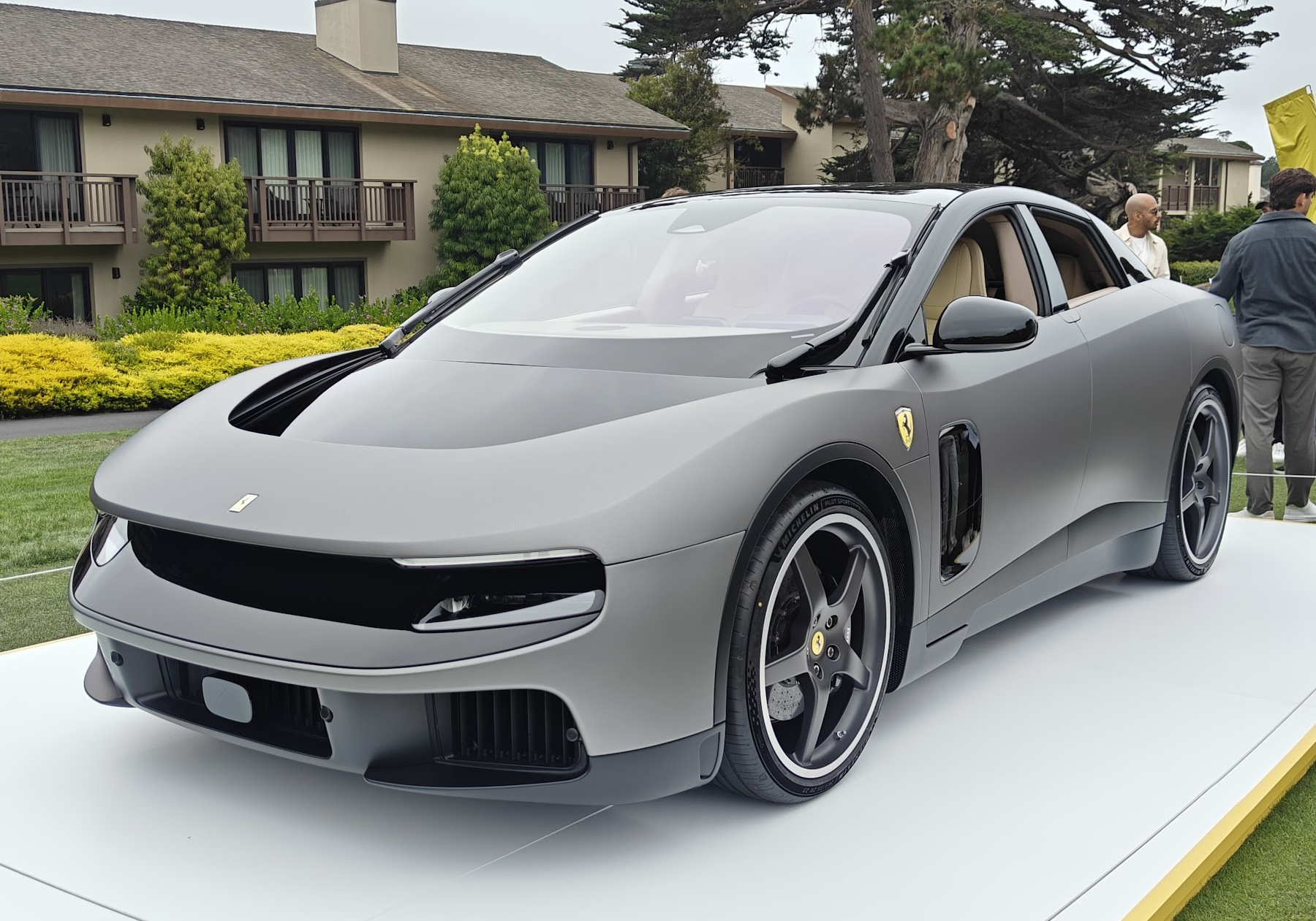
Ferrari Luce

The Ferrari Luce was the sports car manufacturer's first attempt at a battery-electric vehicle and five-seat model; the car was met with criticism after launch because of its controversial design.

Many criticized the design as too plain, in contrast to Ferrari's traditionally sleek design language. Criticism was also directed at the decision to allocate design work to the design collective LoveFrom—led by Jony Ive and Marc Newson—rather than to Ferrari's in-house Centro Stile or Pininfarina, as in the past. The price tag of €550,000 was also criticized.

Former Ferrari chairman Luca di Montezemolo branded the car's decision a betrayal of the company's founder, Enzo Ferrari, saying that the decision was destroying a legend and hoping that the company would remove the Prancing Horse badge that he felt the car did not deserve. He added that it was a car the Chinese would not imitate.

The car's lukewarm reception resulted in the company's stock falling nearly 8.4% on the Borsa Italiana exchange and 5.9% on the New York Stock Exchange.
