= Bricklin =

Bricklin may refer to:

- Bricklin SV-1, a sports car built in Canada
- Bricklin EVX/LS, a fuel efficient vehicle planned for 2010

== Surname ==
- Dan Bricklin (born 1951), co-programmer of VisiCalc
- Malcolm Bricklin (born 1939), businessman who built the Bricklin SV-1 car
