= General Vehicle =

General Vehicle may refer to:

- General Vehicle, the early 20th century electric vehicle manufacturing division of the General Electric Company
- Bricklin Canada Ltd. General Vehicles Inc, the manufacturer of the Bricklin SV-1 sports car
