= Bricklin SV-1 =

American two-seat sports car assembled in Canada (1974–1975)

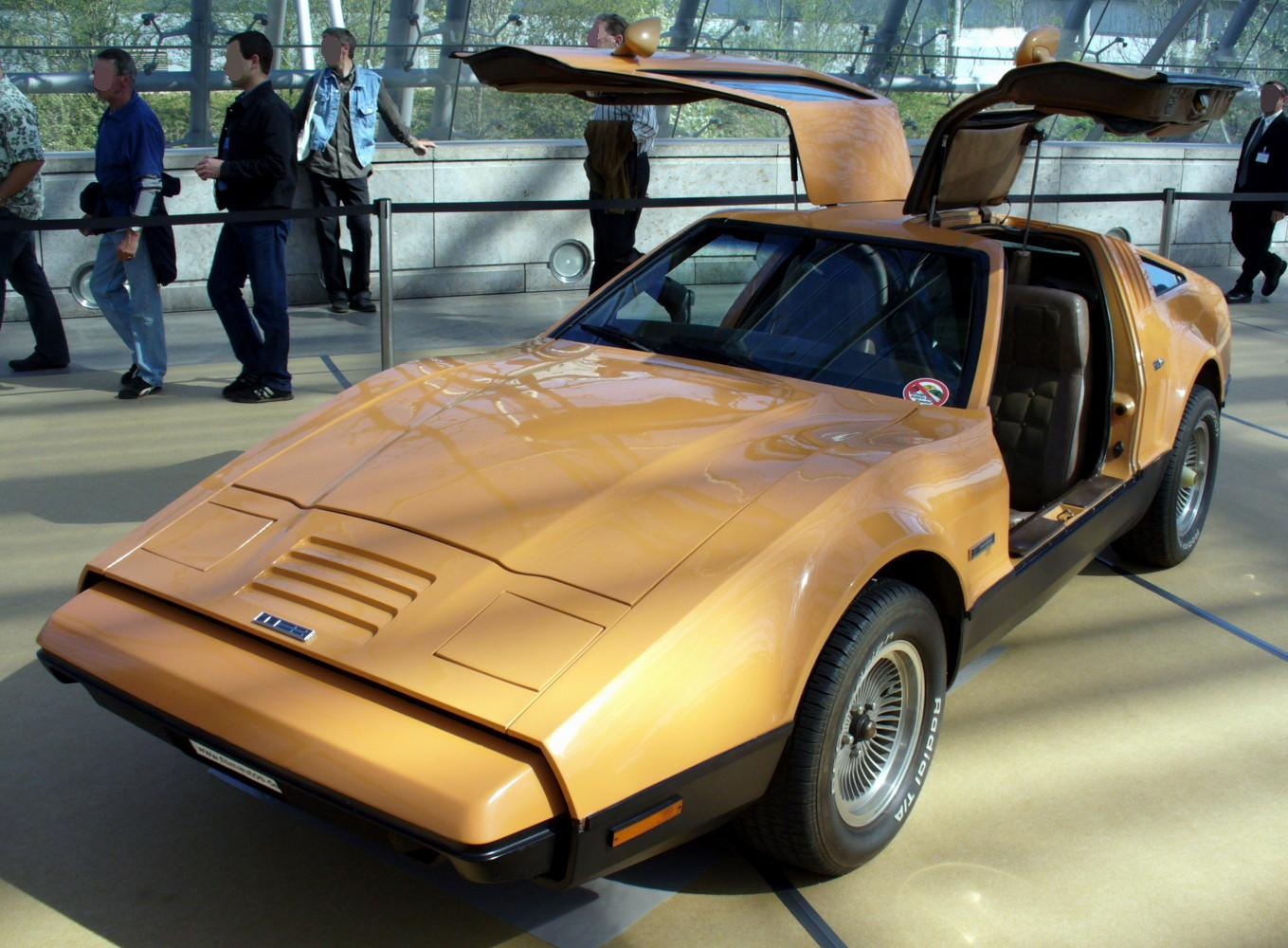

Overview
- Manufacturer: Bricklin Canada Ltd. General Vehicles Inc.
- Production: 1974–1976
- Model years: 1974–1976
- Assembly: Canada: Saint John, New Brunswick
- Designer: Marshall Hobart; Herb Grasse

Body and chassis
- Class: Sports car
- Body style: 2-door hatchback
- Layout: Front-engine, rear-wheel-drive layout
- Doors: Gull-wing doors

Powertrain
- Engine: 360 cu in (5.9 L) AMC V8 (1974); 351 cu in (5.8 L) Ford Windsor V8 (1975–76)
- Transmission: 3-speed Torque Command automatic (1974); 4-speed BorgWarner T-10 manual (1974); 3-speed FMX automatic (1975)

Dimensions
- Wheelbase: 96.0 in (2,438 mm)
- Length: 178.6 in (4,536 mm)
- Width: 67.6 in (1,717 mm)
- Height: 48.25 in (1,226 mm)
- Curb weight: 3,520 lb (1,597 kg)

The Bricklin SV-1 is a two-seat sports car produced by American businessman Malcolm Bricklin and his manufacturing company from 1974 until early 1976. The car was noteworthy for its gull-wing doors and composite bodywork of color-impregnated acrylic resin bonded to fiberglass. Assembly took place in Saint John, New Brunswick, Canada. The name SV-1 is an abbreviation of "safety vehicle one". Bricklin company literature uses both the SV-1 and SV1 formats. To promote the car's safety bona fides, the company touted such features as its integrated roll-over structure and energy-absorbing bumpers.

== Company history ==
The SV-1 was the creation of Malcolm Bricklin. Prior to his Bricklin, built in New Brunswick, Canada, with a loan from the Provincial government, Bricklin is noted as the first businessman to import the Subaru brand into the U.S. in 1968. The Bricklin Canada assembly plant was located in the Grandview Industrial Park in Saint John, New Brunswick, at 150 Industrial Drive. A separate facility to produce the bodywork was in Minto, New Brunswick.

With the support of New Brunswick premier, Richard Hatfield, the provincial government provided $4.5 million of financing. The government believed that this money would be used to cover expenses incurred to begin the production of cars, when in fact it was used for the engineering and development of the car as well as salaries and operations of the Phoenix-headquartered company.

== Model history ==
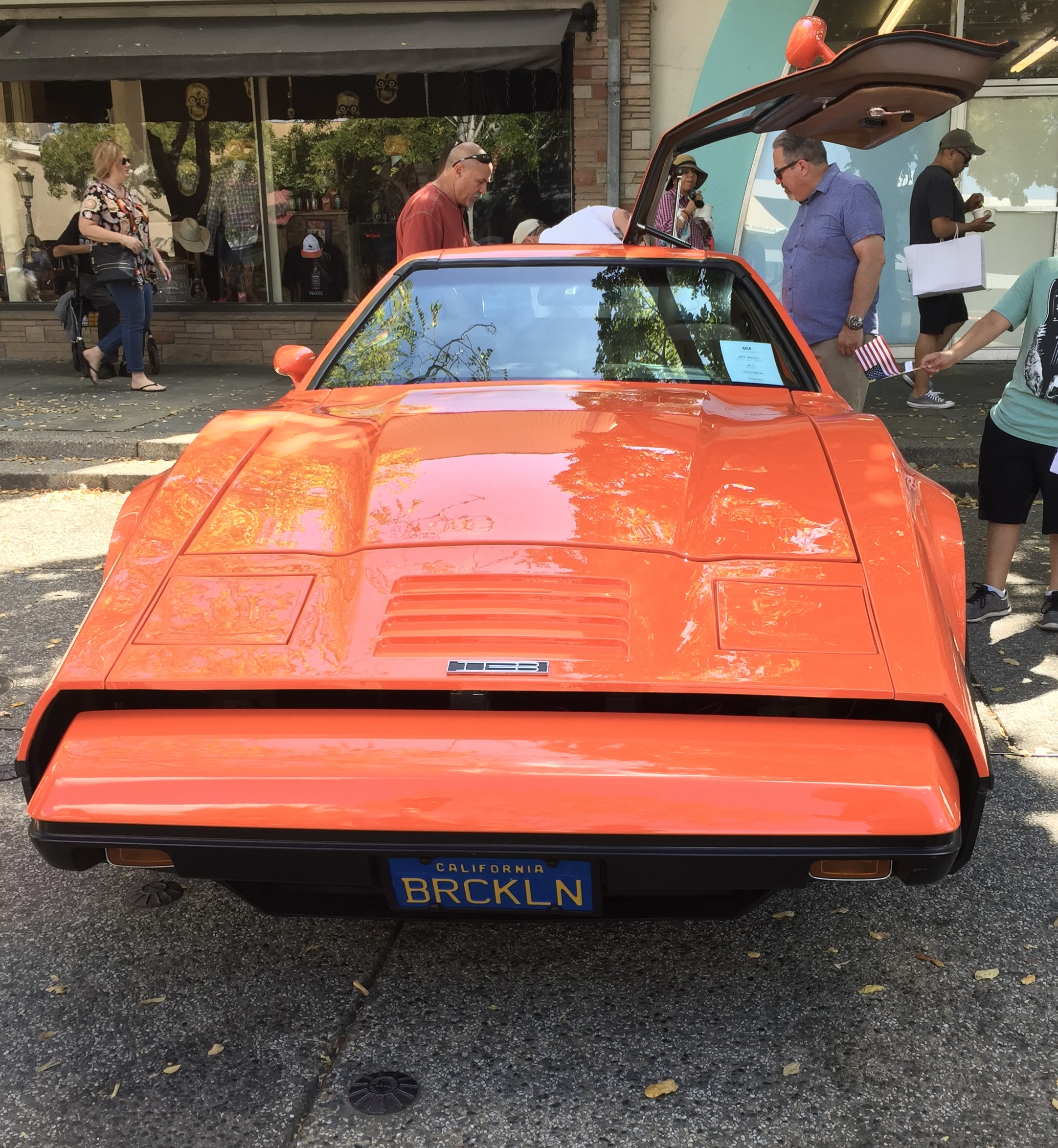
Front

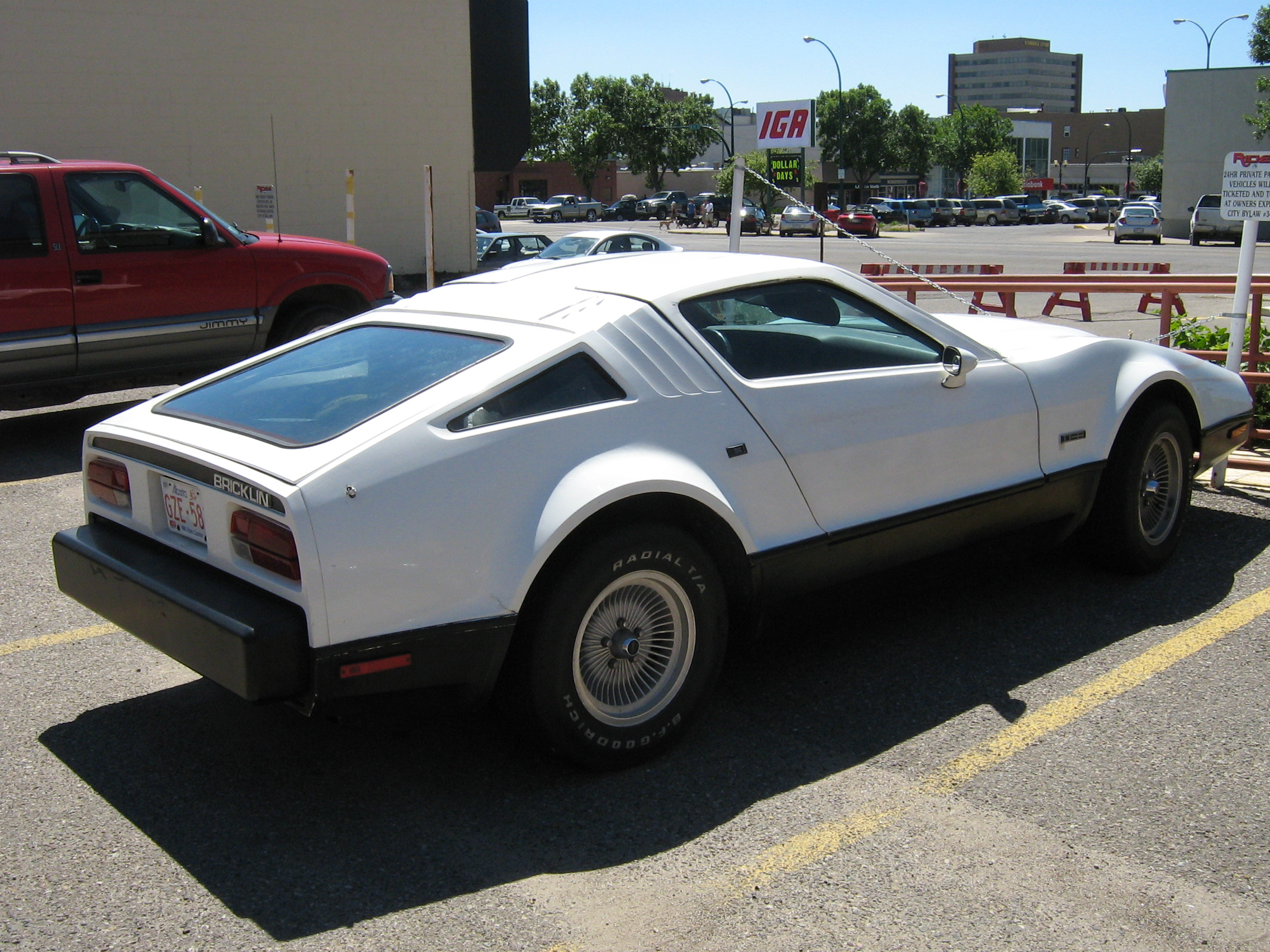
Rear

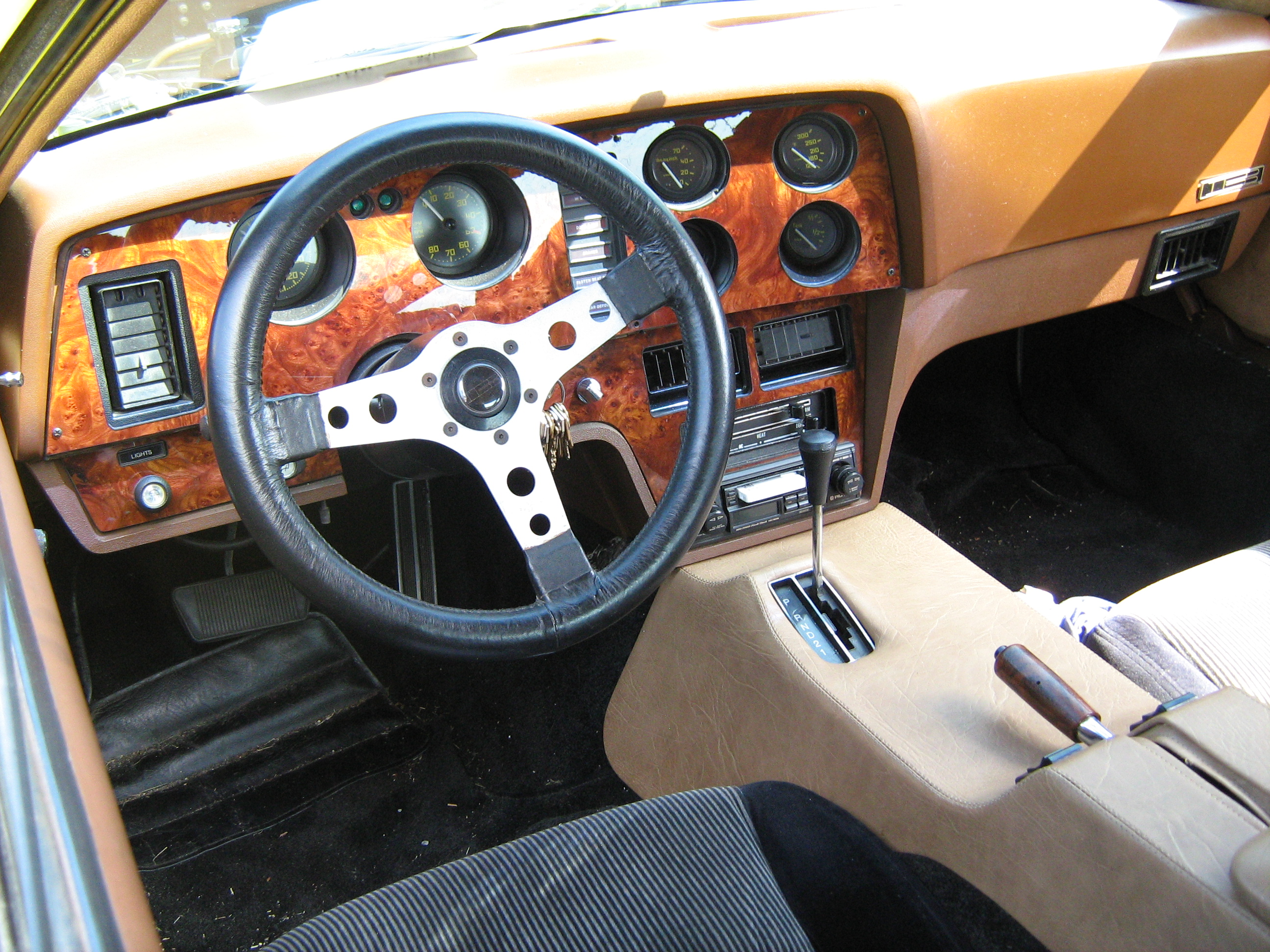
Interior

=== Prototypes, design ===
The SV-1 was the creation of American entrepreneur Malcolm Bricklin, known in the industry for establishing Subaru of America prior to building the SV-1, and for importing Zastava cars to North America under the Yugo name afterwards.

Bricklin wanted to build a small, affordable sports car with gullwing doors. Power was to come from a four-cylinder engine from Opel. Bricklin entrusted design of a road-going proof-of-concept car to Bruce Meyers, but responsibility for the design soon transferred to Marshall Hobart. Dick Dean built the car, which was complete by December 1972. This car became known as the Grey Ghost. When completed the car had a six-cylinder Chrysler Slant-6 engine instead of a four. Other features included a rear suspension from a Datsun 510, a braking system that drew parts from Opel, Datsun and Toyota, and a tilting steering wheel from a Chevrolet.

In 1972, the Bricklin Vehicle Corporation began working with Herb Grasse Design and AVC Engineering to redesign and re-engineer the car. Three prototypes were built with assistance from AVC. AVC engineer Tom Monroe would later join Bricklin as Chief Engineer.

Design of the production SV-1 was done by Herb Grasse, a graduate of the ArtCenter College of Design who had earlier been employed by both Chrysler and Ford. Grasse had also worked with George Barris on the conversion of the 1955 Lincoln Futura show car into the television Batmobile.

It is claimed that Grasse opted to use the same taillamp units fitted to his personal DeTomaso Pantera for the Bricklin. These Carello units were also used on cars from Maserati and Lamborghini, but originally appeared on the Alfa Romeo 2000 Berlina.

The first of the original three prototypes became known as the Red Car. While some references say that it, like the Grey Ghost, had a Chrysler slant-6 engine, pictures exist of a Bricklin identified as the Red Car with an Argentine-sourced version of the Kaiser/Jeep Tornado inline six-cylinder engine from an IKA-Renault Torino installed. All subsequent prototypes had V8 engines. As many as eight prototypes were eventually built.

=== Manufacturing ===
The E.M.C. Company consulted on the plastic bodywork and built some prototype parts. Toolmaker Visioneering Inc. produced the master patterns for the molds using their new CNC equipment. E.M.C. expected to supply both the large panel press as well as a complete set of water-cooled cast aluminum molds for the 22 body-parts required for the Bricklin, but ultimately Bricklin only bought the press from E.M.C., opting to use epoxy molds for their bodywork.

Bricklin experienced persistent problems with the composite acrylic/fiberglass body panel technology. The acrylic resin first selected would blister at temperatures as low as 150 °F (65.6 °C). A substitute resin able to withstand higher temperatures was thinner than the original product, requiring an extra layer of fiberglass in the panel and increasing weight, so Bricklin reverted to the original resin. It was also discovered that ultraviolet light could pass through the acrylic layer, potentially degrading the polyester resins that were used to bond the acrylic to the fiberglass below.

To address these issues the company brought in polymer expert Archie Hamielec from McMaster University in Hamilton. A significant problem was lack of adhesion between the acrylic layer and the fiberglass. According to sources inside the company, as much as 60% of the acrylic used in the first few months of production was lost due to failures during the pressing and bonding stage, and another 10% was lost to damage during shipment of the parts from the Minto plant to Saint John. The only test for the integrity of the parts was one suggested by Albert Bricklin, Malcolm's father, who proposed striking each part that came out of the presses with a seven pound hammer; if the part did not delaminate it passed. Even after an acceptable bonding method was found, in 1975 losses due to poor bonding continued to be 15% to 25% of the parts produced.

=== Release ===
The SV-1 was presented to a gathering of celebrities and potential dealers at the Riviera Hotel Las Vegas in February 1974. The official unveiling of the car took place at the Four Seasons restaurant in New York City on June 25, 1974.

=== End of production ===
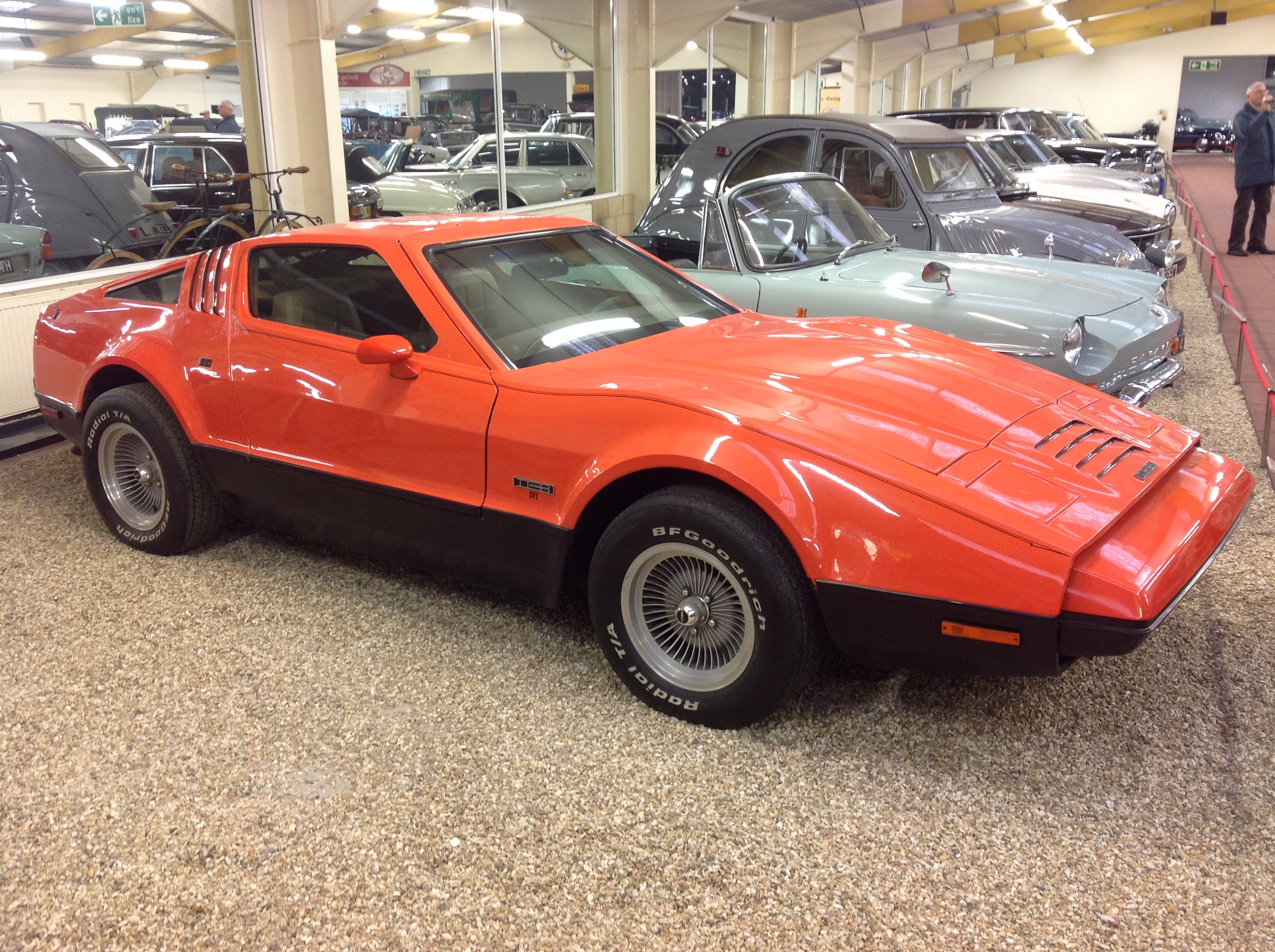
Bricklin SV-1 on display in the Haynes International Motor Museum

Among the factors blamed for the car's ultimate demise were ongoing quality control problems, nepotism, supplier shortages, worker absenteeism, and a series of price increases that more than doubled the price of the car in two years.

Production of the SV-1 ended with just under 3,000 cars built. An estimated 1,700 Bricklins were surviving as of 2012.

Consolidated Motors acquired the inventory of the defunct Bricklin company, among which were several partially assembled cars later completed by Consolidated and sold as 1976 models. Consolidated also built a small number of SV-1s up from bare chassis, which were also sold as 1976 models. Bricklin had incorporated some minor body changes in the car for 1976.

=== Reviews and driving impressions ===
In a test done by Car and Driver magazine in May 1975 the performance of the Bricklin was found to be comparable to the contemporary Corvette, the only other V8-powered 2-seat plastic-bodied North American sports car at the time. On the other hand, automotive critic Dan Neil found the car's performance underwhelming due to its weight and named it to his 50 Worst Cars of All Time list, saying, "This thing couldn't outrun the Rose Bowl Parade."

=== Commemorations ===
- As part of a series commemorating Historic Land Vehicles, Canada issued the Bricklin Stamp on June 8, 1996. It had a face value of 45¢.
- In June 2003, the Canadian mint issued a $20 sterling silver Bricklin coin with selective gold plating.

== Technical features ==
The SV-1 is a two-door, two-seat hatchback with gull-wing doors, hidden headlamps, and a front-engine, rear-wheel-drive layout. Its bodywork is a composite material made up of acrylic resin bonded to a fibreglass substrate. The acrylic is impregnated with the body's colour, which had the potential to reduce costs, as it eliminated the need for the factory to paint the cars in a separate step. The five "Safety" colours offered were one of the few options buyers had.

The doors, which weigh 90 lb (40.8 kg) each, are raised by hydraulic cylinders controlled by switches in the interior, and take up to 12 seconds to open or close. The system is sensitive to the condition of the car's battery, as well as being prone to breakdown. The system uses a single hydraulic pump and has no hydraulic interlock, so opening one door and closing the other at the same time has the potential to destroy the pump.

The Bricklin's chassis is a steel perimeter frame with an integral roll cage. The front and rear bumpers are designed to absorb the force of a 5 mph (8 km/h) impact.

The front suspension uses A-arms and coil springs and is made up of parts shared with a variety of existing AMC models. At the rear is a Hotchkiss system of leaf springs on a live axle.

Braking is by power-assisted 11 in (279 mm) discs in front and 10 in (254 mm) drums in back. Kelsey-Hayes provided the brake components for Bricklins built from 1974 to early 1975, after which the car used parts from Bendix.

Production Bricklins are powered by one of two OHV V8 engines, depending on the year of manufacture. Cars built in 1974 received a 360 cu in (5.9 L) AMC V8 from American Motors. With a single four-barrel carburetor this engine produces 220 hp (164.1 kW) and 315 ft⋅lb (427.1 N⋅m) of torque. Transmission options for the year are a 3-speed Torque Command automatic (AMC's rebranded TorqueFlite 727) or a BorgWarner T-10 4-speed manual. Of the 772 cars built in 1974, 137 received the manual. Cars built in 1975 mounted a 351 cu in (5.8 L) Windsor V8 from Ford, a change which required an extensive redesign of the car's subframe. With a single two-barrel carburetor this later engine produces 175 hp (130.5 kW) and 286 ft⋅lb (387.8 N⋅m) of torque. As Ford had no manual transmission EPA certified for the 351W engine, transmission options were limited to the Ford FMX 3-speed automatic.

The cars have no cigarette lighters or ashtrays. There is also no provision for a spare tire.

== Special models ==
=== Police cars ===
In November 1974, Bricklin announced that they would supply five SV-1s to the police department in Scottsdale, Arizona. Only three 1974 cars were ultimately delivered. The cars were leased to the city for $1 each. The Bricklins had the same paint scheme as the department's regular cruisers and a single beacon on the roof. The cars were used primarily for public relations events. Officers found them difficult to get in and out of, and the Arizona heat caused battery issues that would prevent the electrically operated doors from opening.

=== The "Chairman" ===
In 1975, in an effort to raise capital, development started on a more exclusive model to be called the "Chairman". While mechanically similar to the existing car, Chairman cars were to have a larger engine than the stock SV-1. Visually they would be distinguished by black interior and a black body with gold stripes, gold coloured wheels and trim, and a gold-plated toolkit. The buyer was to be flown to the assembly plant to watch their car being built and receive a gold jumpsuit along with the car on delivery.

Two existing SV-1s were used to prototype the Chairman. Prototype #3 was used for the car's exterior appearance, and SV-1 VIN #1339 was used for interior development. Work on the car began in Arizona in June 1975 and moved to Livonia by July. The Chairman did not reach production.

The unfinished interior model VIN #1339 was bought by former Bricklin Manufacturing Engineering manager Terry Tanner and completed in the style of a Chairman.

=== Mini Bricklin ===
In 1978, mini-car builder F.W. & Associates offered a miniature version of the SV-1 to existing Bricklin owners through the pages of the Bricklin International quarterly magazine. The cars were powered by a 3 hp (2.2 kW) Briggs & Stratton gasoline engine and could be ordered in any of the Bricklin factory colours. List price was $550.00. The serial number of each mini-Bricklin was the same as that of the buyer's full-size car.

== In the media ==
- The Bricklin Story is a 30-minute promotional film produced in 1974 by Insight Productions with funding from Bricklin. It aired nationally on CBC and was roundly panned by critics.
- History Television and Barna-Alper Productions produced a documentary, The Premier, The Promoter & Their Car, for its Turning Points of History series. The documentary explores the political fiasco that surrounded the Bricklin vehicle.
- Film company Cojak Productions and director Chris LeBlanc produced a dramatized retelling of the Bricklin saga titled La Légende Bricklin. Malcolm Bricklin returned to New Brunswick to shoot scenes where he played himself. Three Bricklins once owned by the Irving family were discovered in Halifax and were purchased for use in the film. The film aired on RDI and Radio-Canada on April 15, 2006.
- As part of its series "Tout le monde en parlait", Société Radio-Canada presented a 30-minute documentary on the car that focused on its economic impact in 2013.
- Bricklin International member and New Brunswick resident Charlie Russell wrote a two-part song, "The Bricklin", which takes a satirical view of the history of the car.
- In 2010, Theatre New Brunswick and The Playhouse (Fredericton) produced a musical, The Bricklin: An Automotive Fantasy, portraying the Bricklin story through funk music. An orange-colored Bricklin similar to Hatfield's was used on stage during the show.
- In 2021, the Season 1 Episode 6 installment of 'Seduced By Speed' produced by Motor Trend featured the Bricklin cars and interview footage with Malcolm Bricklin.

== See also ==
- DMC DeLorean; a similar two-seat gull-winged sports car
- Visionary Vehicles
