= Subaru of America =

American distributor of Subaru vehicles

Coordinates: 39.9223326°N 75.0460762°W

Subaru of America, Inc.
- Type: Subsidiary
- Founded: 1968; 58 years ago; in Bala Cynwyd, Pennsylvania, US
- Headquarters: Camden, New Jersey, US
- Key people: Tadashi “Tady” Yoshida(Chairman of the Board and CEO, Subaru of America); Jeffrey A. Walters,(President, Chief Operating Officer, Subaru of America)
- Products: Subaru vehicles in the United States market
- Number of employees: 5,900
- Parent: Subaru Corporation
- Website: subaru.com

Subaru of America, Inc. (commonly abbreviated as SOA), based in Camden, New Jersey, is the United States–based distributor of Subaru's brand vehicles. SOA is a subsidiary of Subaru Corporation of Japan. The company markets and distributes Subaru vehicles, parts and accessories through a network of more than 600 dealers throughout the United States. SOA also plays a minor role in the design of vehicles for the U.S. market, working with Subaru Corporation and Subaru Research and Development to help convey American consumer preferences.

== History ==
In 1967, Malcolm Bricklin approached Subaru with the idea of bringing the tiny Subaru 360 to the United States. After a great deal of regulatory red tape and negotiation, Bricklin made a deal with Subaru. Bricklin formed Subaru of America, Inc. to sell Subaru franchises and later brought in Harvey Lamm as the COO.

Subaru of America established the Eastern Division in 1968 in Bala Cynwyd, Pennsylvania, at 555 City Line Avenue, and the Western Division at 1000 West Coast Hwy, Newport Beach, California. The headquarters shortly thereafter was moved to Pennsauken, New Jersey in 1970, and then Cherry Hill, New Jersey in 1986. Subaru of America continued to operate as an indepent company, serving as the exclusive importer and distributor of Subaru vehicles and parts until 1990, when it was fully acquired by Fuji Heavy Industries (now named Subaru Corporation).

In 1989, Fuji Heavy Industries and then-partner Isuzu opened a joint factory in Lafayette, Indiana, called Subaru-Isuzu Automotive, Inc., which initially manufactured the Subaru Legacy and Isuzu Rodeo. In 2001, Isuzu sold its stake in the plant to FHI for $1 due to flagging sales and it was renamed Subaru of Indiana Automotive, Inc. SIA has been designated a backyard wildlife Habitat by the National Wildlife Federation, and has achieved a zero-landfill production designation. SOA is SIA's largest customer, being the sole distributor in the United States for SIA produced vehicles, although SIA also ships vehicles to Canada and various other countries for sale by other Subaru Affiliates and independent distributors. SOA also utilizes SIA's two mile test track and off-road course for dealer incentive programs and training.

In 2018, Subaru of America was covered in an Eneref Institute report examining the use of natural interior daylight at one of the company's U.S. retail showrooms.

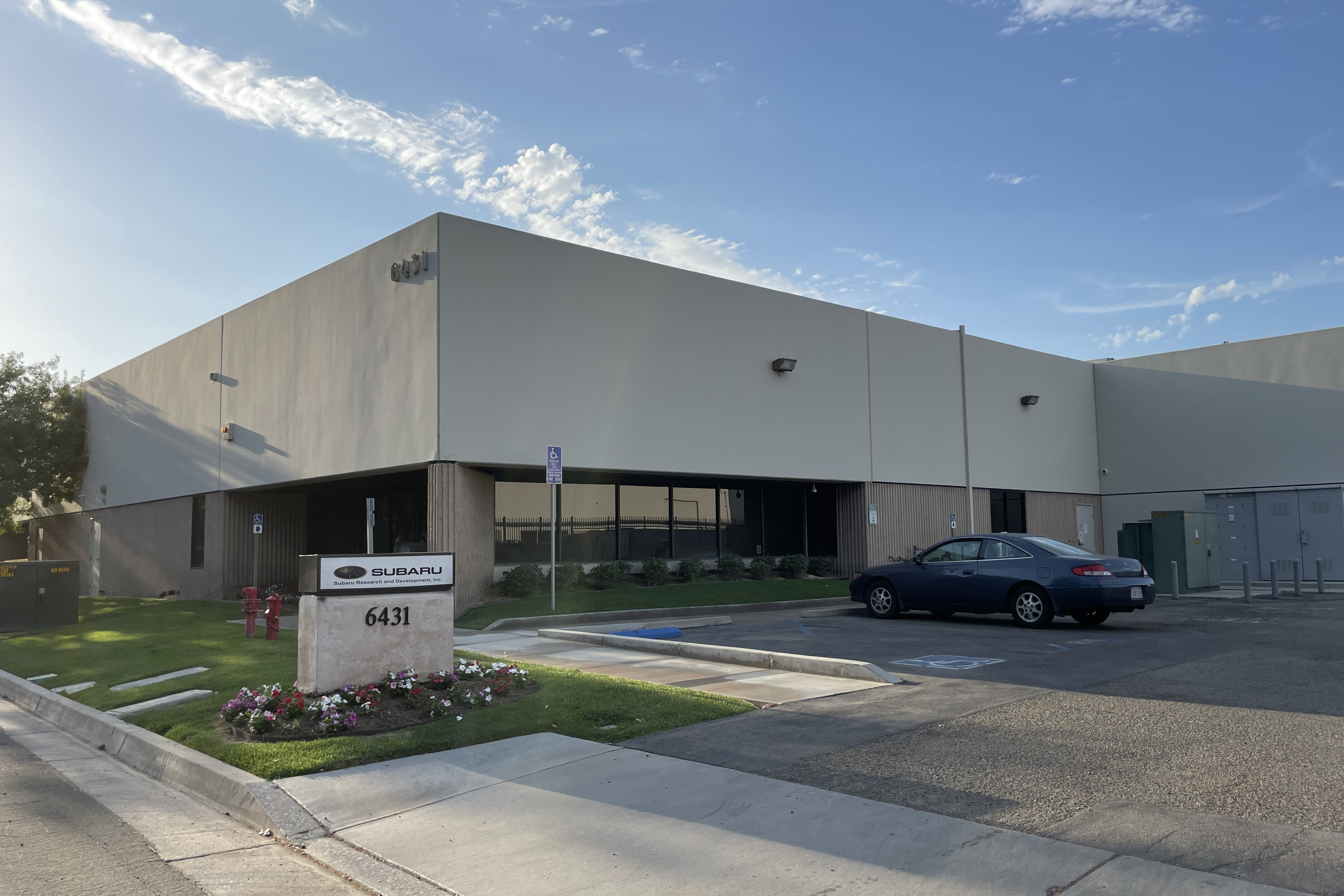
Subaru Research & Development in Cypress, California

Subaru built a new 250,000 square foot headquarters in Camden, New Jersey, and relocated there in 2018. In May 2019 demolition started on the previous Subaru building in Cherry Hill.

== Popularity in the LGBT community ==
In the United States, Subaru vehicles have been associated with being popular with lesbians. Subaru of America's marketing strategy from 1993, at a time when very few celebrities were out as LGBT and "Don't Ask, Don't Tell" and Defense of Marriage Act had just passed. Subaru was at the time marketing more towards niche groups such as skiers and kayakers. As all-wheel drive was becoming standard on all Subaru models, when looking for people willing to pay a premium for all-wheel drive, four possible core groups were identified, who at the time were responsible for half of Subaru's US sales: teachers and educators, health-care professionals, IT professionals, and outdoorsy types. A fifth group was found - single women living in places like Northampton, Massachusetts and Portland, Oregon, well known meccas of LGBT community. The lesbian Subaru customers liked that the cars were "good for outdoor trips, and good for hauling stuff without being as large as a truck or SUV, fitting them without being too flashy". Some Subaru ads for that reason have featured double entendres with LGBT-related terms. In addition, Subaru of America has actively supported the LGBT community, such as supporting the Rainbow Card providing dedicated benefits to the community, and has been credited with treating its LGBT customers as "people, not consumers". In a Car Talk e-mail nominations survey, Forester and Outback were ranked as #2 and #1, respectively, of "The Ultimate Lesbian Cars".

== Products ==
Subaru cars available in the United States, which are sold by SOA:

=== Present models ===
- Subaru Impreza since 1993
  - Subaru WRX since 2002 (known as the Impreza WRX through the 2014 model year)
- Subaru Outback since 1994 (known as the Legacy Outback through the 1996 model year)
- Subaru Forester since 1997
- Subaru BRZ since 2013
- Subaru Crosstrek since 2013
- Subaru Ascent since 2019
- Subaru Solterra since 2022
- Subaru Trailseeker since 2026
- Subaru Uncharted since 2026

=== Past models ===
- Subaru 360 1968–1970
- Subaru 1100 1971
- Subaru 1300 1972
- Subaru 1400 1973–1976
- Subaru 1600 1977–1979
- Subaru BRAT 1978–1987
- Subaru DL/GL 1980–1989
- Subaru XT 1985–1991
- Subaru Justy 1987–1994
- Subaru Loyale 1990–1994
- Subaru Legacy 1990–2025
- Subaru SVX 1992–1997
- Subaru Baja 2003–2006
- Subaru Tribeca 2006–2014
- Subaru Impreza WRX STI (later known simply as WRX STI) 2004–2021

== Motorsports ==
With the rise of rally racing, and the import scene in the U.S., the introduction of the highly anticipated Subaru Impreza WRX in 2001 was successful in bringing high performance, AWD compact cars into the sports car mainstream. Subaru supplies a factory-backed team for Rally America, and has won the driver's title in five of the seasons.

Starting in 2006, Subaru of America sponsored the Subaru Road Racing Team (SRRT) with a Subaru Legacy 2.5 GT Spec-B in the Grand-Am Street Tuner class. In 2010, SRRT campaigns a WRX STI in the Grand Sport class.

== See also ==
- Subaru
- Subaru Industrial Power Products
- Subaru of Indiana Automotive
- Subaru Park, a soccer stadium near Philadelphia sponsored by Subaru of America
- Toyota Motor Sales, U.S.A., Inc.
