= Yugo =

Subcompact car manufactured by Zastava

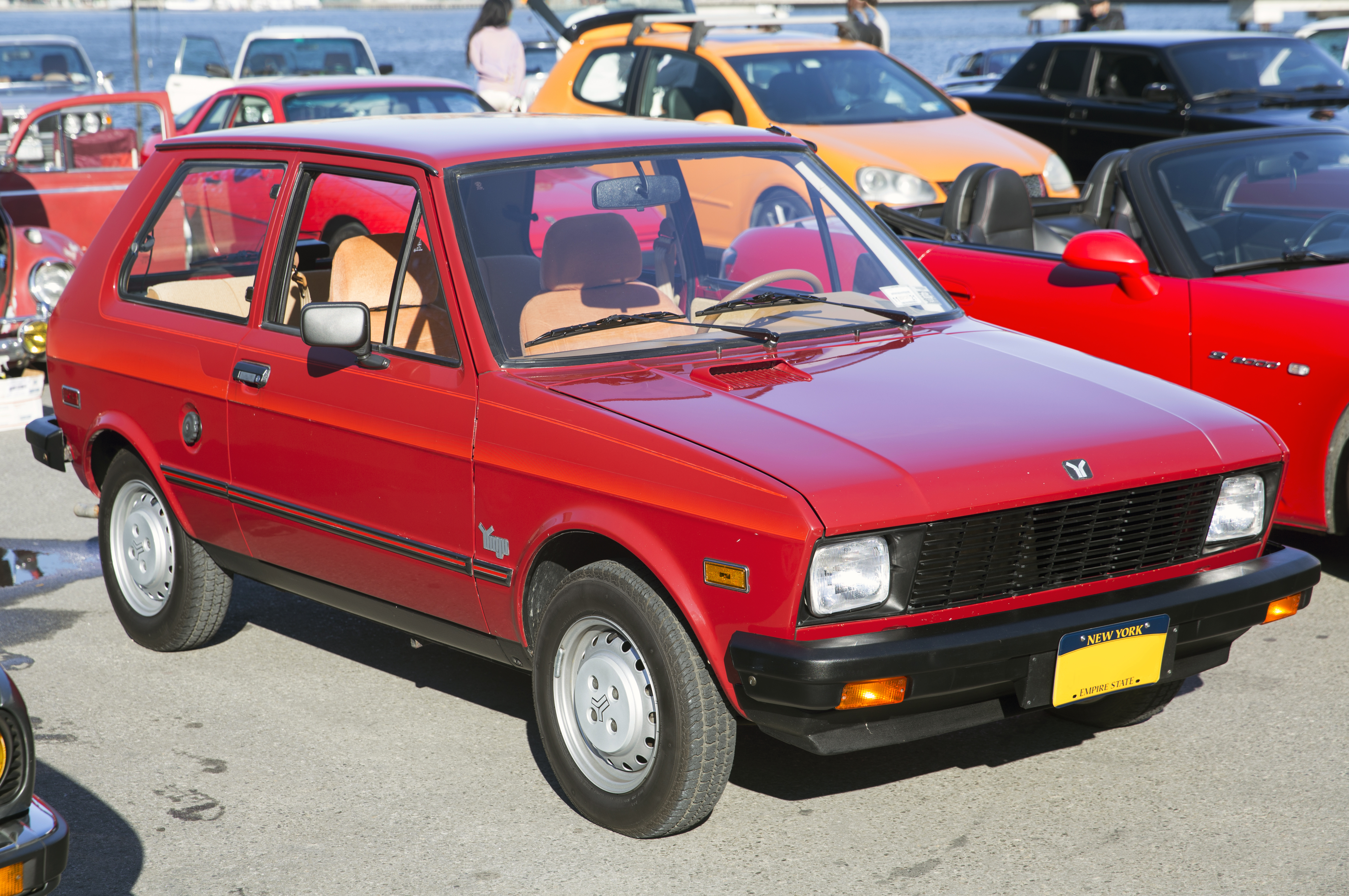
- 1987 Yugo GV

Overview
- Manufacturer: Zastava
- Also called: Zastava Jugo/Yugo; Zastava Koral; Yugo 45/55/60/65; Yugo Ciao; Yugo GV/GVL/GVS/GVX; Yugo Koral; Yugo Tempo; Innocenti Koral
- Production: 28 November 1980 – 11 November 2008
- Assembly: Yugoslavia / Serbia: Kragujevac

Body and chassis
- Class: Subcompact (B)
- Body style: 3-door hatchback; 2-door convertible
- Layout: FF layout
- Related: Fiat 128; Fiat 127

Powertrain
- Engine: 903 cc Fiat 100 I4; 1116 cc Fiat 128 SOHC I4; 1124 cc PSA TU1 SOHC I4; 1301 cc Fiat 128 SOHC I4
- Transmission: 4-speed manual; 5-speed manual; 3-speed automatic

Dimensions
- Wheelbase: 2,150 mm (84.6 in)
- Length: 3,485 mm (137.2 in)
- Width: 1,548 mm (60.9 in)
- Height: 1,390 mm (54.7 in)
- Curb weight: 825 kg (1,819 lb) to 920 kg (2,028 lb)

The Yugo (pronounced [ˈjûɡo]), also known as the Zastava Yugo, Zastava Koral (pronounced [ˈzâːstaʋa ˈkǒraːl], Serbian Cyrillic: Застава Корал), Yugo Koral, Yugo Tempo or Jugo, is a subcompact hatchback manufactured by Zastava Automobiles from 1980 until 2008, originally a Yugoslav corporation. Originally named the Zastava Jugo 45, various other names were also used over the car's long production run, like Yugo Tempo, Yugo Ciao, or Innocenti Koral. It was most commonly marketed as the Yugo 45/55/60/65, with the number referring to the car's maximum power. In the United States, it was sold as the Yugo GV (and sub-versions).

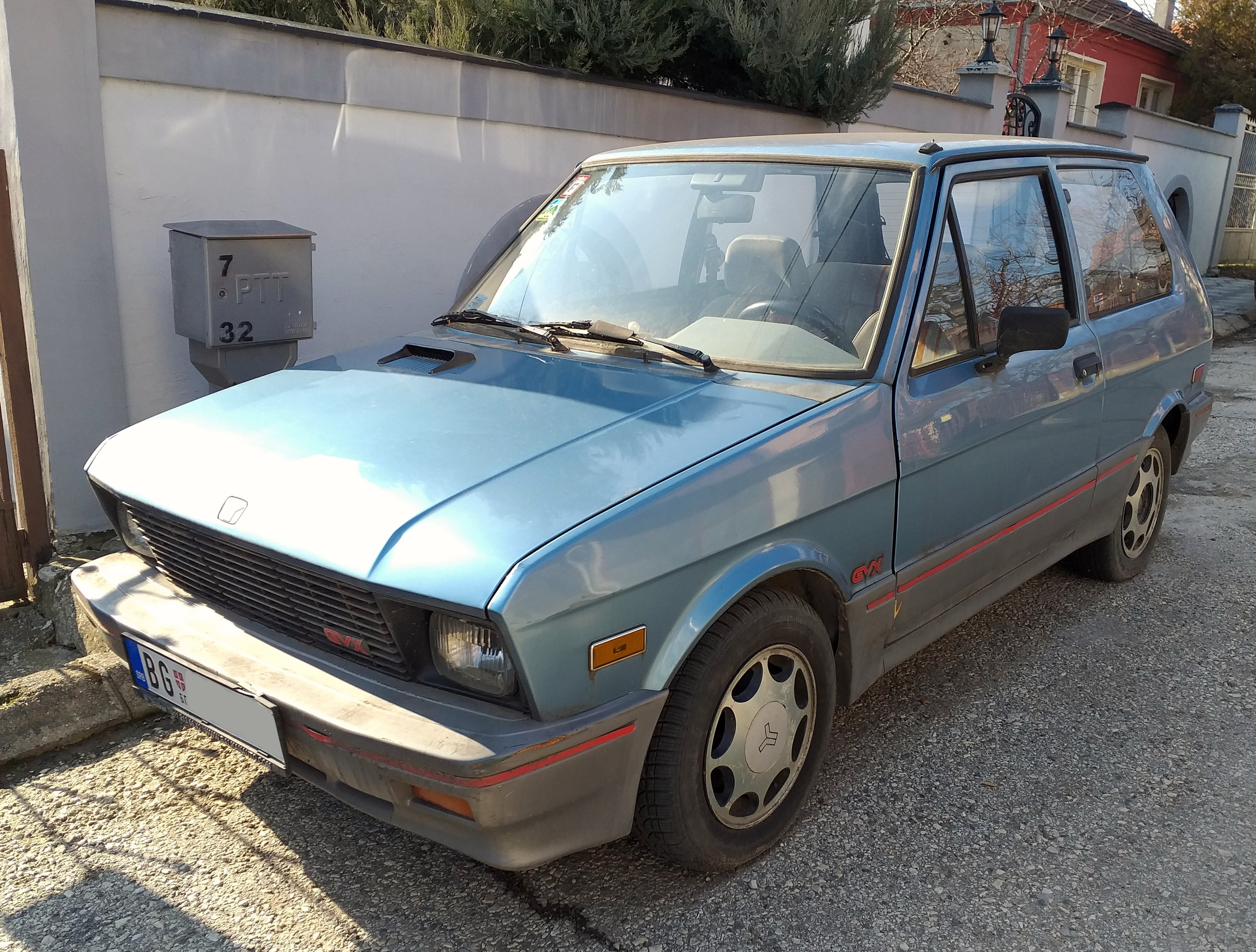
Yugo GVX

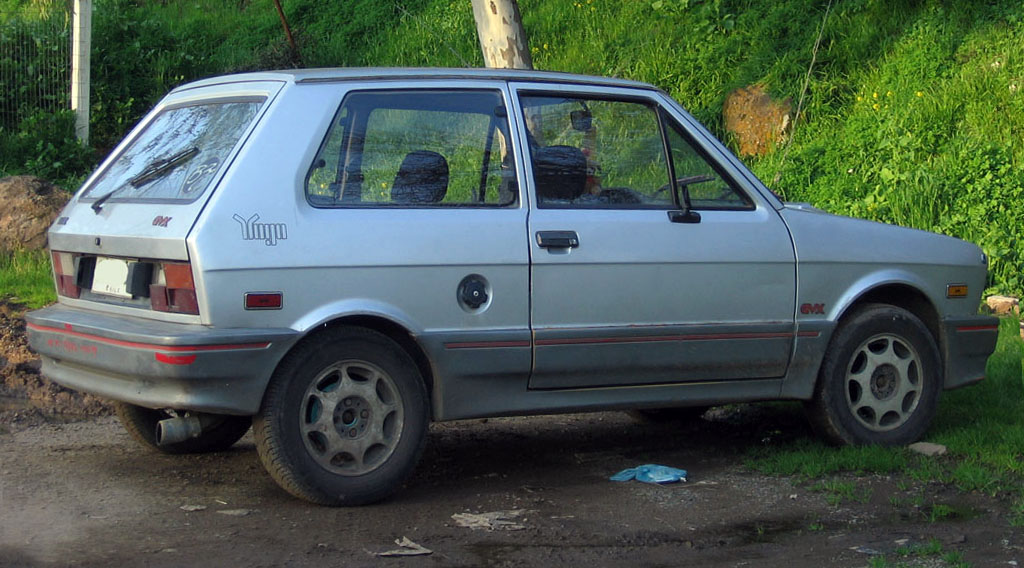
Yugo 65 GVX 1.3 EFI in Chile

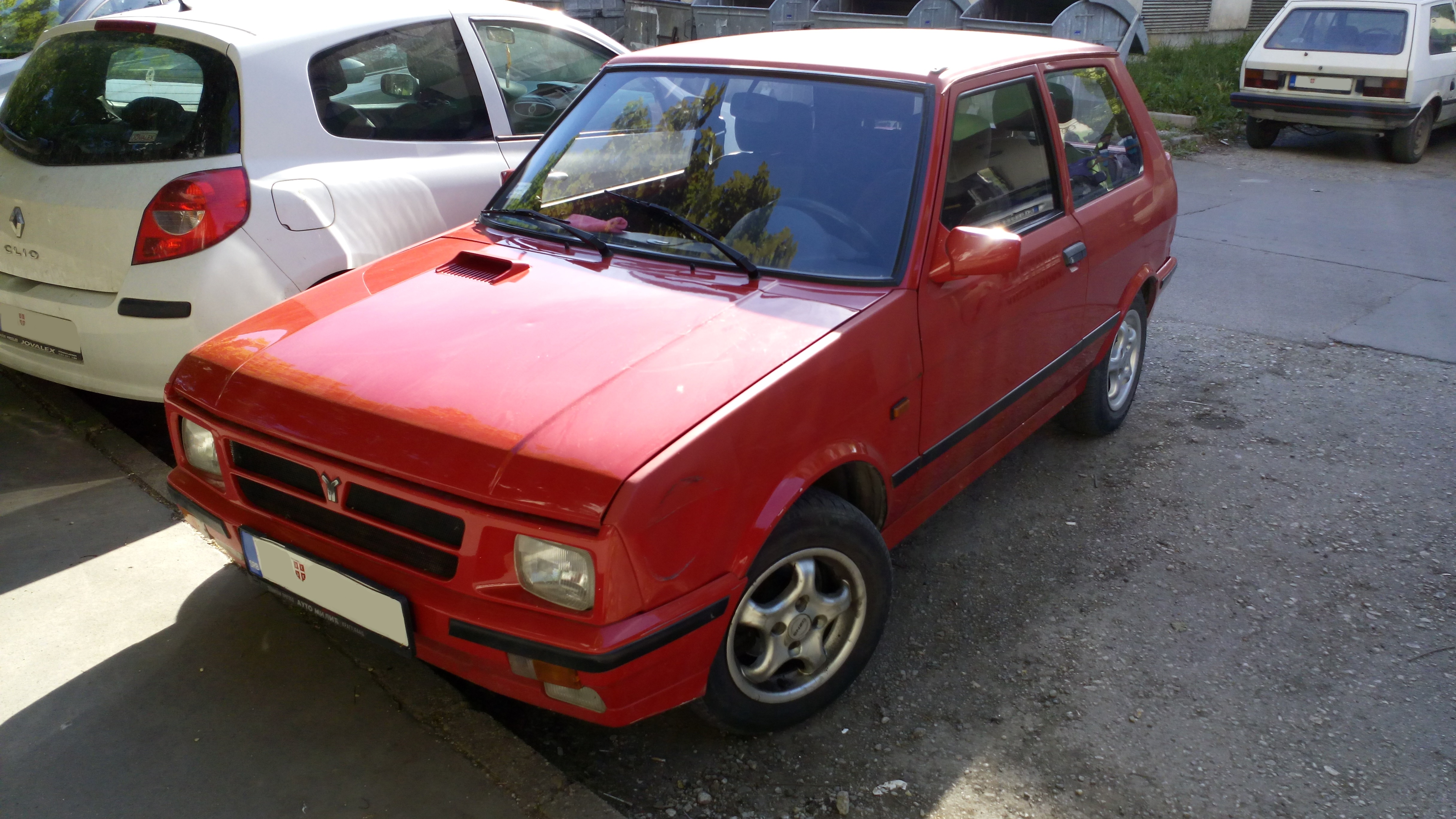
Yugo Ciao

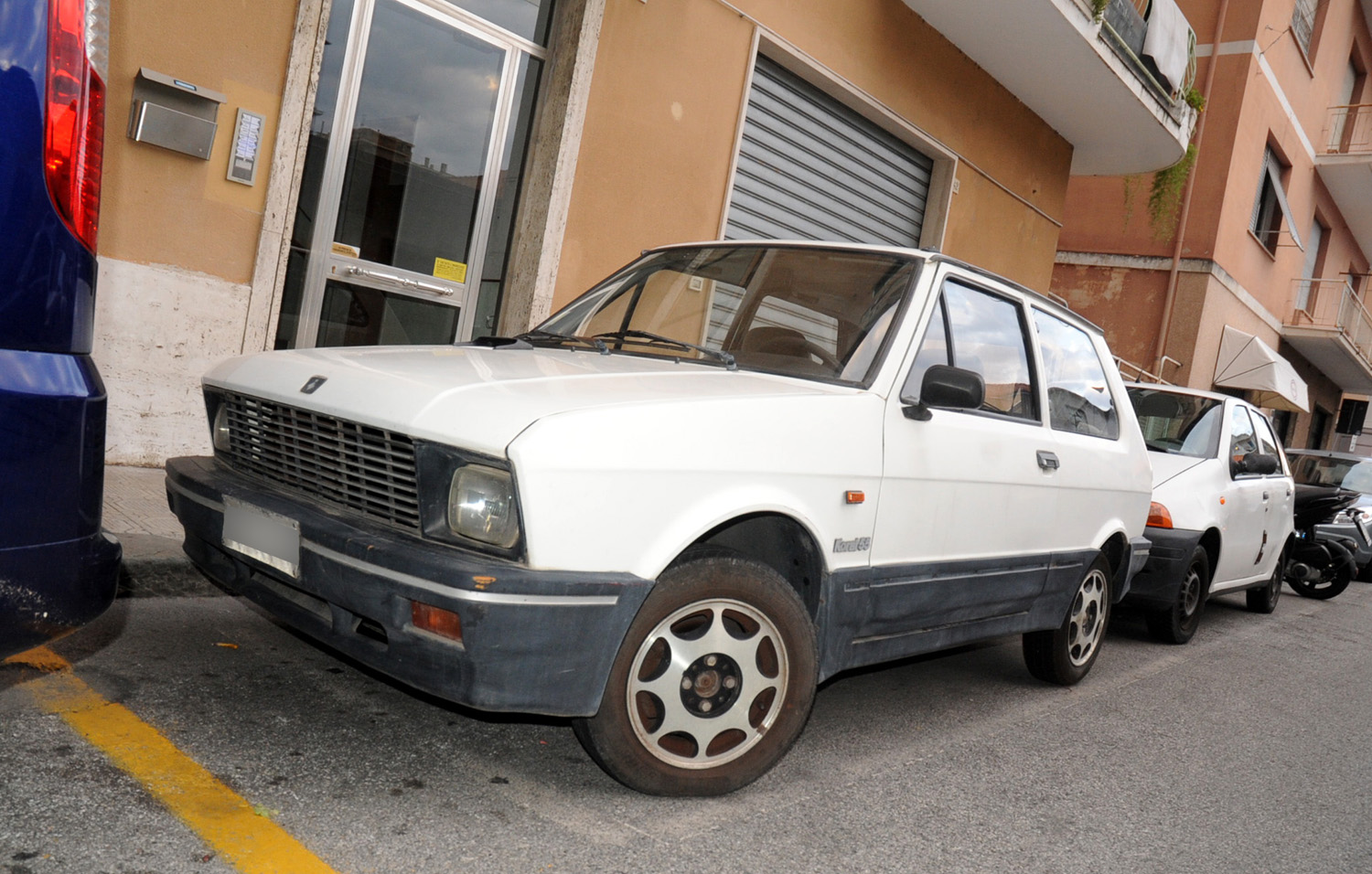
Innocenti Koral 55

Originally designed as a shortened variant of the Fiat 128, series production started in 1980. The Zastava Koral IN, a facelifted model, was marketed until 2008, after which the production of all Zastava cars ended. Between 1980 and 2008, more than 794,000 Yugos were produced in total.

The Yugo was marketed in the United States from 1985 to 1992 by Malcolm Bricklin, who asked Jerry Puchkoff to conceive and produce the market introduction and launch of the Yugo in 1985 with a total of 141,651 sold, peaking at 48,812 in 1987 and falling to 1,412 in 1992. Despite moderate success during its run in the United States and several other export markets, it was criticized for its design, poor safety, and reliability, though the car has also picked up a cult following.

== Models ==
Over the course of its production, the model range was marketed under various nameplates:

- Yugo 45 / Zastava Koral 45 / Koral 1.0 (903 cc Economic engine) [33 kW/45 hp] (Yugoslavia [later Slovenia, Croatia, Bosnia and Herzegovina, Serbia, Montenegro, and North Macedonia], United Kingdom, Europe),
- Yugo 55 / Zastava Koral 55 / Zastava Koral 1.1 with the bigger 1.1L 55HP engine from Zastava 101, also carbureted (Yugoslavia, U.K., Europe).
- Yugo 60 [1.1L 60HP engine Weber twin barrel carburetor version] (Germany, Europe, Latin America),
- Yugo 60 efi (1.1L 60HP Electronic fuel injection engine) (Germany, Europe, Latin America),
- Yugo 65 / Zastava Koral 1.3 [1.3L 65HP engine Weber twin barrel carburetor version] (Germany, U.K., Europe, Latin America),
- Yugo 65 efi (1.3L 65HP Electronic fuel injection engine) (Germany, Europe, Latin America),
- Yugo 65A GLX (Highest RHD trim model with 1.3L 65HP Weber carburetor and special front/back bumpers, spoiler and body plastics) (U.K.),
- Yugo GV (United States),
  - Yugo GV Plus Automatic (Renault 3-Speed automatic transmission) (U.S.),
  - Yugo GV Sport (U.S.),
  - Yugo GVC (U.S.),
  - Yugo GVL (U.S.),
  - Yugo GVS (U.S.),
  - Yugo GVX (1.3L EFI engine) (U.S.),
- Yugo Cabrio (Cabrio version with electric roof and modified bumpers. Most often equipped with 1.1 carbureted or 1.3 EFI motors; U.S., Germany, Yugoslavia, and Greece),
- Yugo CL (Facelifted model with modified front/rear bumper, grille and body parts (Yugoslavia and Europe),
- Yugo Ciao (Sports version of Yugo CL with modified suspension, special color palette and sport steering wheel, gear stick and pedals) (Yugoslavia and Europe)
- Zastava Koral IN (2nd facelift model with modified front/rear bumpers, body parts, and interior) (Serbia and Europe),
  - Zastava Koral In 1.0E (903 cc Economic engine),[33 kW/45 hp] (Serbia and Europe),
  - Zastava Koral In 1.1i [46 kW/63 hp] (Serbia and Europe),
  - Zastava Koral In 1.3i [65 kW/68 hp] (Serbia and Europe),
  - Zastava Koral In L (60 PS [44 kW] Peugeot Euro 3/4 engine; Serbia and Europe),
  - Zastava Koral 45/55 Van (Serbia and Europe),
- Yugo Tempo (Yugoslavia and Europe – circa 1991),
- Innocenti Koral (Italy)
  - Innocenti Koral Cabrio (Italy).

=== Earlier models ===
Yugo 45 derivative models have included the Yugo 55, 60, and 65, which all indicated the power of the fitted engine in HP. Yugo engines were produced by the Belgrade company 21. Maj (DMB). The 1.0 L and 1.1 L engine was produced and fitted with a carburetor until its end of production in 2010.

In the 1980s, fuel-injected models with a higher engine capacity were gradually introduced, starting with the GVX-EFI (Koral 65). The fuel-injection system was a Motronic MP3.1, which was later upgraded by Bosch as the Motronic M4.6 MPI on 1.1 L and 1.3 L engines, adding multiport fuel injection. It had a three-way catalytic converter and a Lambda sensor.

Zastava did not target only the West: In early 1985, 500 Yugos were exported to China, and exports to Bulgaria and Egypt were already established.

=== Later models ===
Near the end of its production run, Zastava sold an updated version of the Yugo Koral model, known as the Zastava Koral IN, which had central locking. It included a three-step rotary switch for leveling the headlamps in four positions, four-speaker audio system, electric windows, folding electro-adjustable side-view mirrors, alloy wheels, an optional air conditioner, and an optional Renault-designed three-speed automatic transmission. Zastava sold these in Serbia, Montenegro, Croatia, Bosnia and Herzegovina, North Macedonia, Greece, Lebanon, Libya, Syria, Tunisia, and Egypt.

Besides the Koral versions, other models included the Florida and Skala. In October 2003, an agreement with Fiat was reached for production of the Fiat Punto by Zastava for Eastern European markets, known as the Zastava 10. The Koral IN L, equipped with a Peugeot fuel-injected 1.1 L-60 PS (44 kW) engine, met the European Union safety standards in a test supervised by the German Technischer Überwachungsverein (TÜV), a necessary step for importation to EU countries.

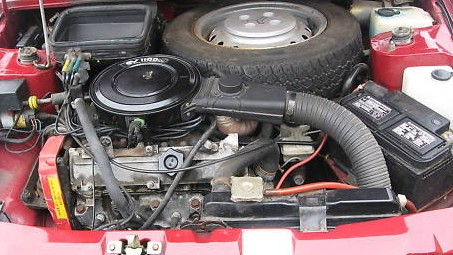
U.S.-spec 1.1 L engine

=== Powertrains ===
Engine	Standard	Optional
903 cc (55.1 cu in)	four-speed manual	
1,116 cc (68.1 cu in)	five-speed manual	
1,116 cc (68.1 cu in)	four-speed manual (US)	
1,124 cc (68.6 cu in); Koral In, Peugeot engine	five-speed manual	
1,301 cc (79.4 cu in)	five-speed manual	three-speed automatic

== History ==
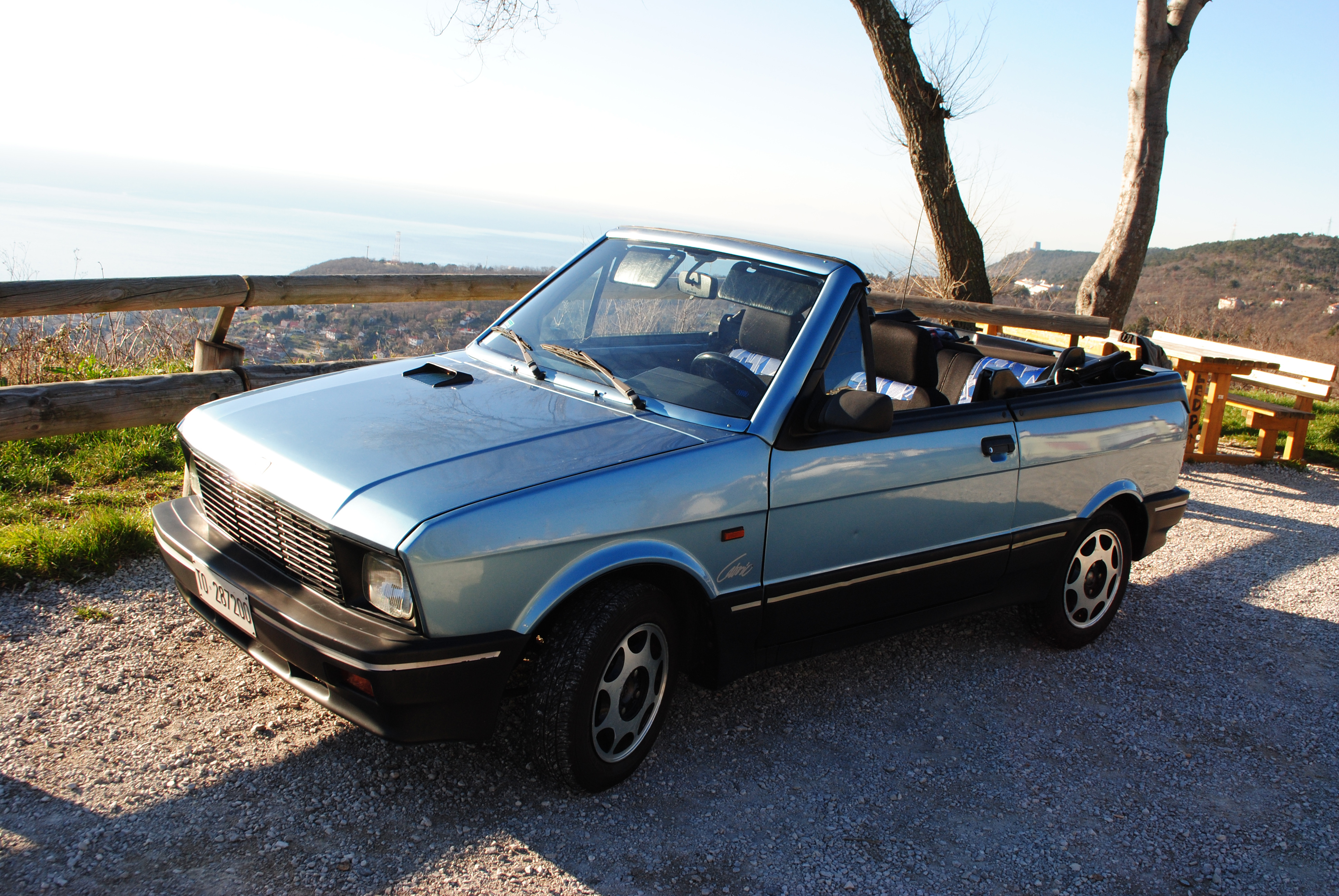
Italian version of Yugo Cabrio 1.3 branded as Innocenti, photographed near Trieste

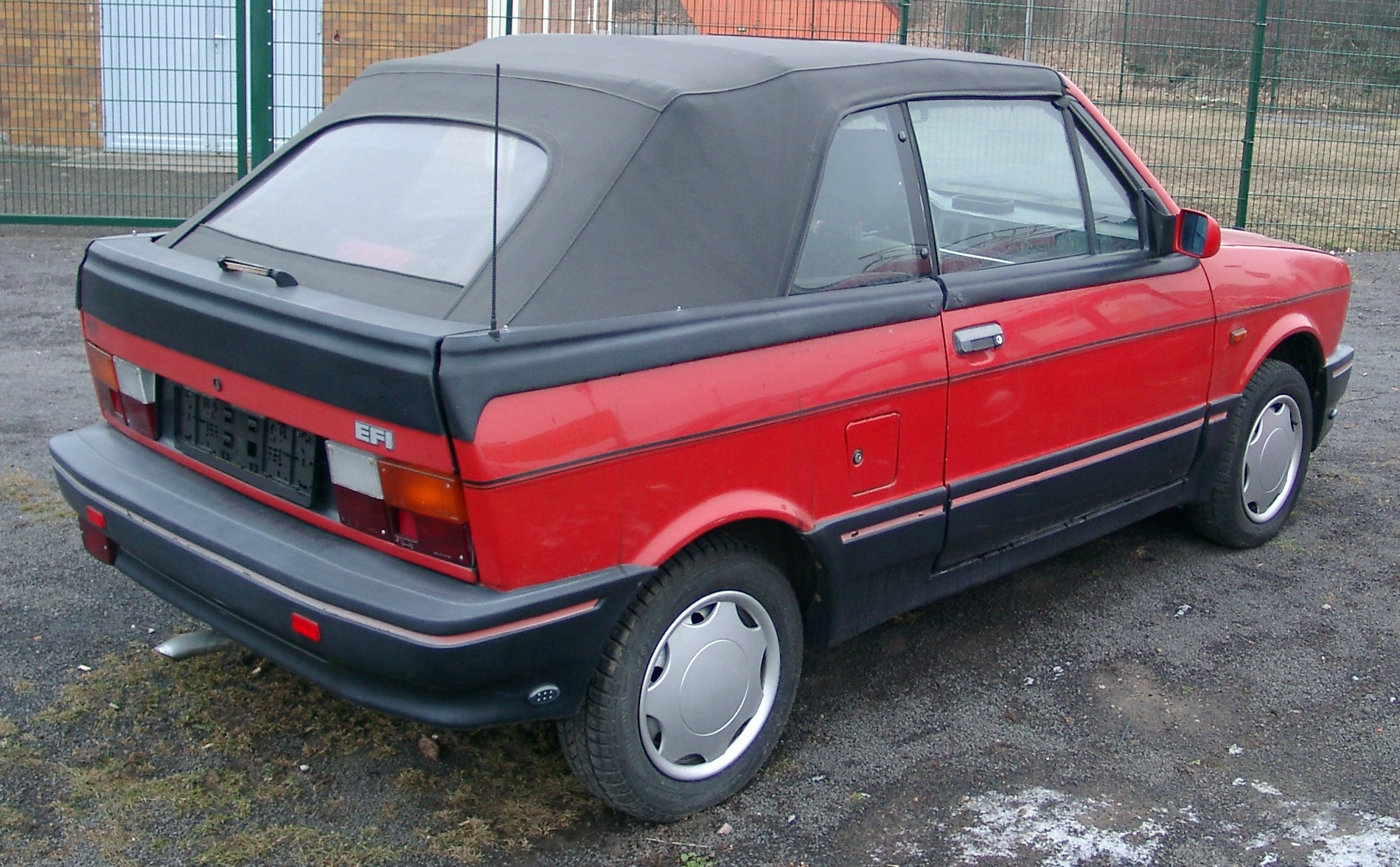
Yugo Cabrio 1.3 EFI with an automatic electro-hydraulic folding/raising roof mechanism

=== Background ===
Zastava was founded as an arms manufacturer in 1853. By the late 1930s, the company had expanded into automobile production supplying Ford-designed trucks to the Royal Yugoslav Army. Vehicle production continued until 1941, when World War II reached Yugoslavia. Following the war, Zastava was permitted to produce Jeeps under license from Willys-Overland until production was halted in the early 1950s.

As Zastava celebrated its 100th anniversary, it started producing vehicles under license from Fiat. The first passenger models were produced on 26 August 1953 using designs licensed by Fiat of Turin.

The first widely successful model was a licensed version of the Fiat Milletrecento ("One thousand three hundred") in which Zastava also introduced some local modifications. It was a sedan called the "Hiljadu i trista" ("One thousand three hundred") and was powered by a 1,300 cc engine.

One of the most successful and recognizable models were those based on the Fiat 128 model, marketed under different names: Zastava 101, Zastava 128, Zastava 311, Zastava Skala, etc.

From 1962 to 1985, Zastava produced its second most popular model, an updated version of the rear-engined Fiat 600, called the Zastava 750. It featured a larger engine capacity, larger headlights, bigger fuel tank and modernized interior. The most popular model was the Zastava 101, a hatchback version of the Fiat 128. The 101 also formed the basis for the smaller Yugo.

By the 1970s, it was clear to Zastavas engineers that the design and technology of their entry level model in their production lineup, the Zastava 750, was highly outdated. The Yugo was designed as a more modern replacement for Zastavas, at the time entry model, the 750. However, due to the 750's popularity the Yugo and the 750 were initially produced simultaneously from 1980 until 1985, after which production of the 750 ended. The first Yugo prototype was manufactured on 2 October 1978 and was supposedly given as a gift to then Yugoslav President Josip Broz Tito.

=== 1980s ===
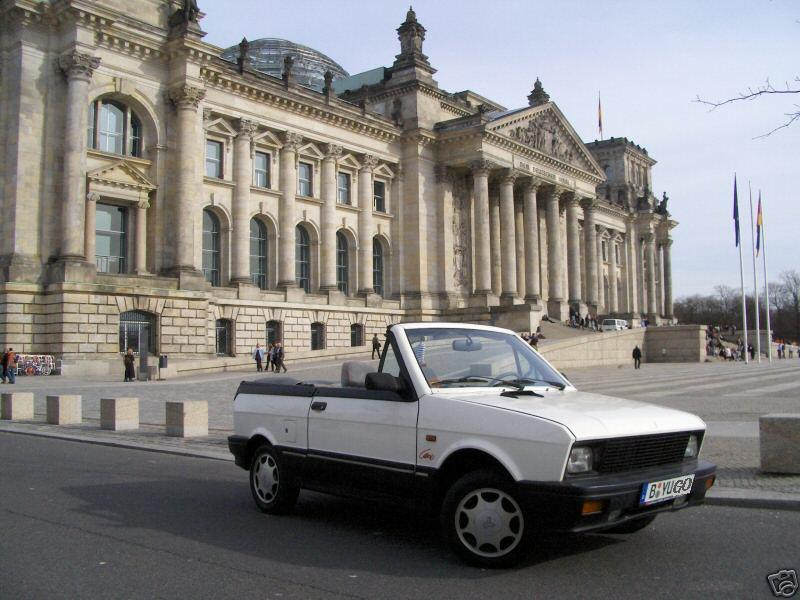
A 1992 Yugo Cabrio parked near the Reichstag building in Berlin

Zastava introduced its Jugo (or Yugo) model on its own initiative in 1980. It was a shorter version of the 128-based cars already built by the company. Zastava soon began exporting its new offering to other Eastern European markets, installing the bigger 128 overhead-cam engine for a top speed of 90 mph (145 km/h). The production officially started on 28 November 1980.

The parts production by Yugoslav republics was as follows:

- Most of the electrical parts were produced in Nova Gorica, Slovenia.
- The interior fittings were made in Split, Croatia.
- Brakes were produced in Varaždin, Croatia.
- The engine's electrical parts were produced in Banja Luka, Bosnia and Herzegovina.
- Seat belts, locks, and mirrors were produced in Ohrid, Macedonia.
- The rest of the car's parts and final assembly was done in Serbia.

Early 1980–1985 models featured opening vent windows, round side indicators, only a single set of tail lights on each side of the car, no rear defroster, and usually a black interior with a black dashboard, and many metal trim pieces such as window crank handles and door handles. Since around 1985, the cars received more comfortable seating, a blue or brown dashboard, two-part tail lights on each side, square side signals, rear defroster, redesigned instrument cluster, and fixed vent windows in the front doors.

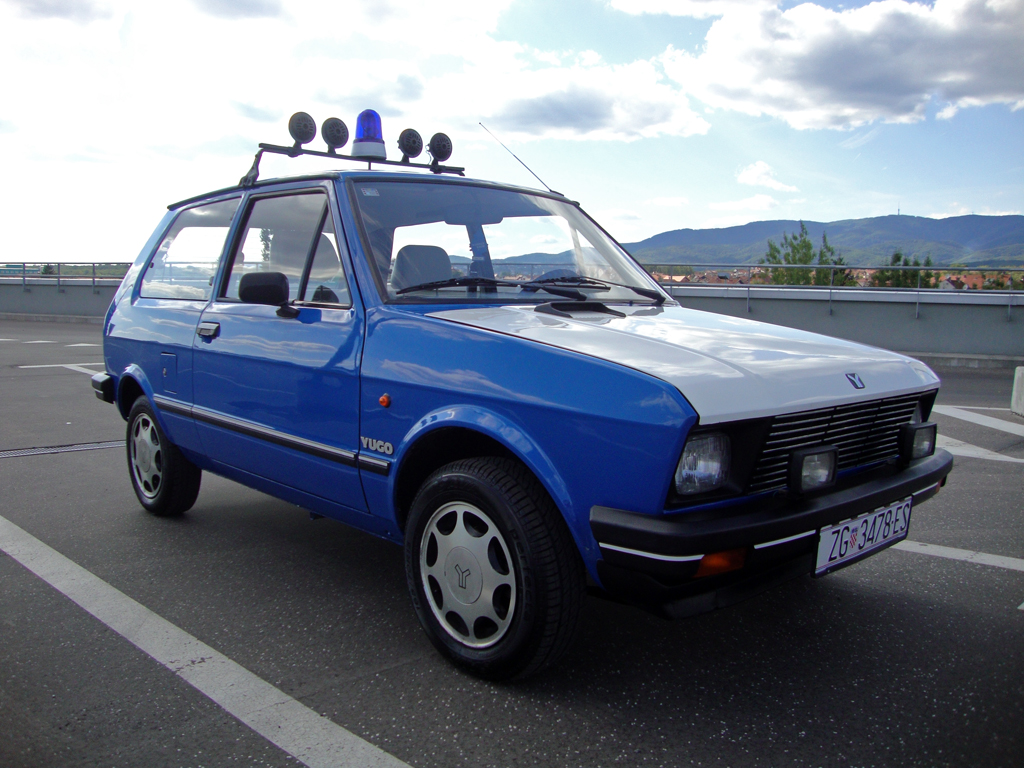
A 1990 Yugo police car in Croatia pictured in 2010

Many mechanics and even Zastava factory workers agree that the "best" Yugos ever were built between 1988 and early 1991. Quality control was good; high standards were set in terms of plastic quality, seat cloth, and "a well screwed together" interior. Paint and antirust coatings were also well done during that period, evidenced by many cars still showing no signs of rust, tears in the seats, or major engine issues after more than 20 years.

1989 was considered a "golden year" for Yugos because almost 200,000 were built that year, and many can still be seen on the road today. Also, cars were usually branded Yugo instead of Zastava during that period, because the company was taking pride in the (at the time) good sales and reputation established in the export markets, especially in the United States.

In 1990, a batch of 450 cars with automatic transmissions and air conditioning was shipped to the United States. With political problems starting in 1991, quality dropped significantly, with problems such as plastic parts of the dashboard not fitting correctly.

In 1990, a fuel filler flap was added instead of a twist cap, and some minor interior and instrument cluster changes were implemented. In 1991, the dashboard was redesigned first for the Yugo GVX and then for the European model, side butterfly windows were removed, and a bigger tank was introduced.

=== In the United States ===
International Automobile Importers (IAI) was a company founded by Malcolm Bricklin to import the X1/9 and 2000 Spider after Fiat halted their manufacture. Bertone and Pininfarina carried on production under their own names and Bricklin's IAI took over their North American importation. Bricklin wanted to import additional brands, and international dealmaker Armand Hammer had been asked by the Yugoslavs to identify business areas in which they could generate exports to bolster their economy. Hammer thought the idea of exporting the small cars made in Kragujevac, Serbia, by Zavodi Crvena Zastava, would be viable. Zastava had, since the mid-19th century, been a quality armaments producer and sponsored its own museum.

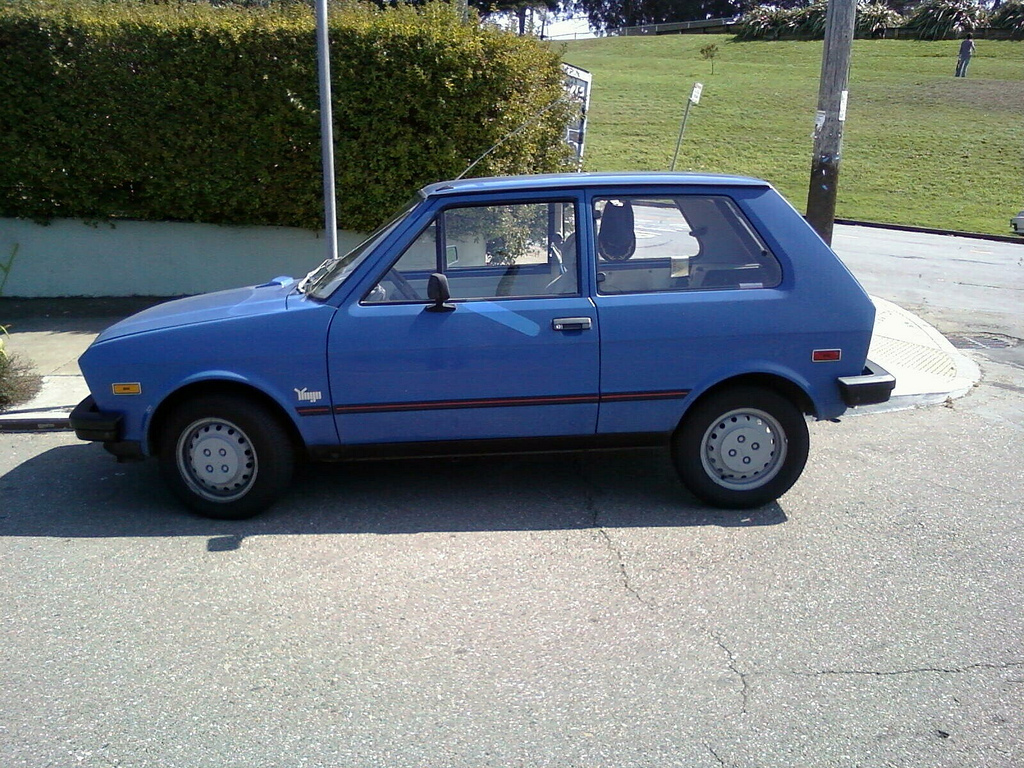
Yugo GV in San Francisco, California

In 1982, U.S. entrepreneur Miro Kefurt contacted Zastava in Kragujevac (ZCZ-Zavodi Crvena Zastava) with an idea to export the Yugo 45 to the United States. The vehicles were to be renamed Yugo GV for the North American market and YugoCars, Inc. was formed in Sun Valley, California, by Kefurt and Ray Burns. The proposal required approval by Fiat in Italy due to existing contractual restrictions in effect for Fiat—Zastava collaborations.

The first three Yugo vehicles, painted red, white, and blue, were introduced to the U.S. public at the Los Angeles Auto Show in May 1984. The car was promoted with a ten-year/100,000-mile (160,000-km) warranty, free maintenance, and a price of only $4,500. Front-page articles about the Yugo appeared in the Los Angeles Times (Business Section), New York Times, and The National Enquirer. However, problems soon arose as one car was sent to the California Air Resources Board for emissions testing, which it badly failed. The Yugo needed much reengineering, and with no help forthcoming from Zastava, Kefurt was in a problematic situation.

Reportedly, Bricklin attended the Los Angeles Auto Show, and while the show was still in progress, flew to Yugoslavia to make a deal to import the Yugo to the United States himself. But Kefurt and YugoCars already held the exclusive import contract for 5,000 vehicles for the 1985 model year to be sold only in California, and the California emissions certification was already in progress. In November 1984, the marketing rights were sold by YugoCars to International Automobile Importers (IAI) for $50,000 ($10 per car). Additionally, Miro Kefurt obtained an exclusive dealer franchise from IAI to sell the Bertone X1/9 in North Hollywood, California.

YugoCars had intended to fit their Yugo 45 with the 903-cc, 45-horsepower four-cylinder engine with a three-way catalytic converter and oxygen sensor for emissions control. Predicted gas mileage was 42 to 45 miles per US gallon (5.6 to 5.2 L/100 km; 50 to 54 mpg_{‑imp}) at 70 miles per hour (110 km/h). In late 1983, Zastava added a version called the Yugo 55, powered by a bigger engine used in the Fiat 101/128. IAI's Tony Ciminera preferred using this larger, 1,100 cc engine making 55 horsepower, though it would drop fuel economy to the 30 miles per US gallon (7.8 L/100 km; 36 mpg_{‑imp}) range, for it was faster and more able to keep up on North American freeways. Even so, with an 86 mph (138 km/h) top speed, it was the slowest car sold in the United States.

Setting up Yugo America to import the car, Bricklin assigned Bill Prior to sort out the distribution and Tony Ciminera to fine-tune the Yugo for the American market. Ciminera carried out a bumper-to-bumper audit that resulted in more than 500 changes to meet the needs of the U.S. market, including compliance with American safety and emissions regulations. The vast Yugo facility was patterned after the Fiat factories of the early 1950s and employed 50,000, divided among 85 basic associated labor organizations and 25 work committees. For U.S. models, a separate assembly line was built with handpicked elite staff earning extra pay ($1.23 per hour extra), building Yugos destined for the New World. The first shift began at 6:00 am, and after an eight-hour day, many employees left for their second jobs in other workplaces.

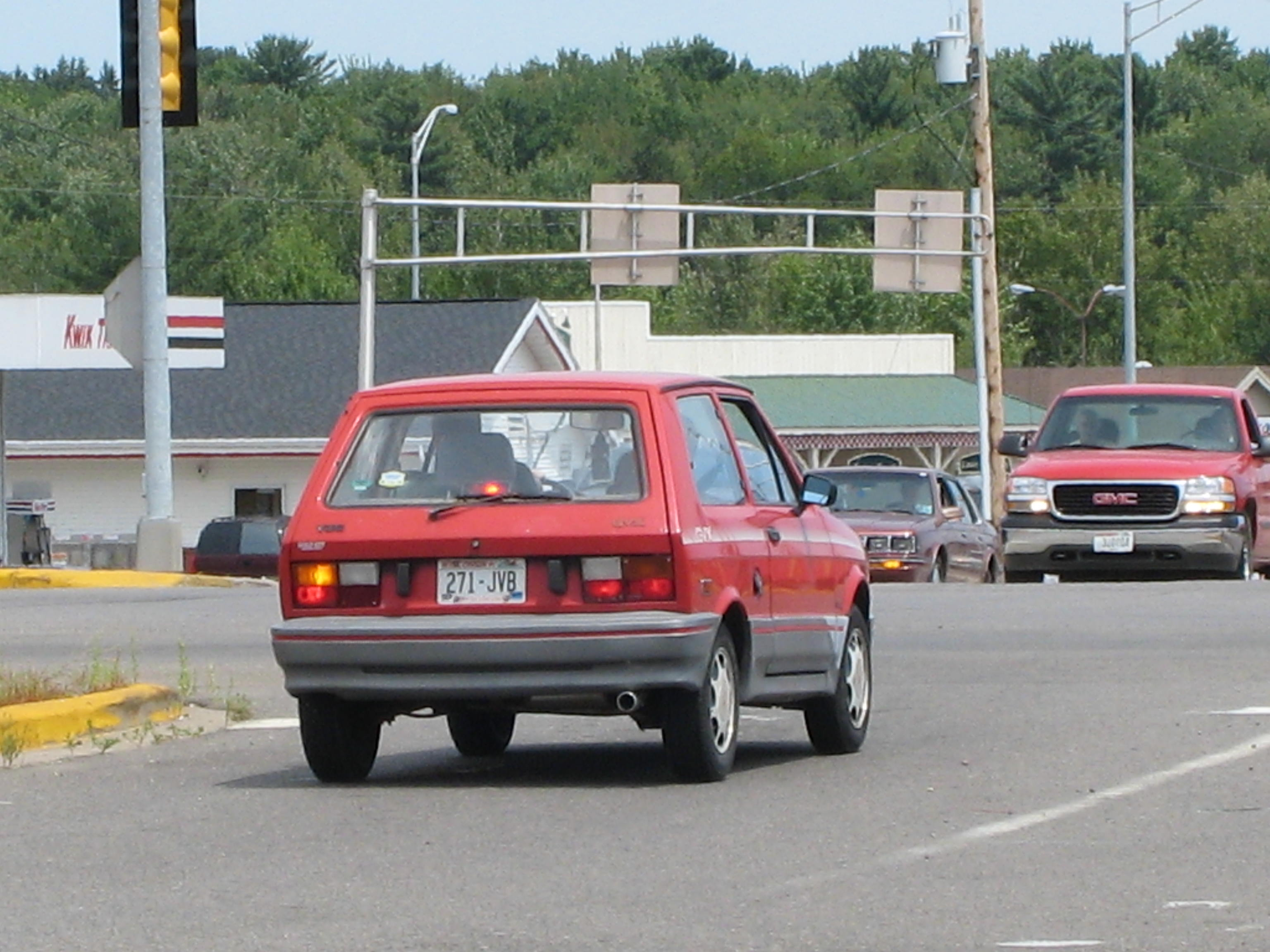
Yugo GVX (1.3 EFI version) in Wausau, Wisconsin

The chief engineer and head of Zastava's Research and Development Institute was Zdravko Menjak, who worked with Bricklin's people at the plant to monitor the effort, constantly stressing the need for high quality. A team of British quality experts went to Kragujevac to study the factory and recommend improvements.

In 1984, automobile entrepreneur Malcolm Bricklin tested the United States market for Zastava vehicles, now branded as Yugo. As a result, in mid-1986, Yugo America began selling cars at a starting price of $3,990 (equivalent to $11,719.26 in 2025) for the entry-level GV ("Good Value") hatchback equipped with the 1,100 cc overhead-cam five-main-bearing engine and four-speed manual transmission. The similar GVL offered a plusher interior, but the sporty top-line GVX was powered by the 1,300 cc engine mated to a five-speed manual transmission, and included as standard equipment a number of deluxe features such as a ground-effects package, alloy wheels, and rally lights. However, though the GVX was billed as an upscale, sporty version of the base GV, it went from 0 to 60 mph in 13.56 seconds, just a half a second faster than the GV.

Five models of Yugo were sold in the United States during the 1987 model year: the original, basic entry-level $3,990 GV (for "Great Value"), which was later joined by the sporty looking GVS which received a body kit and other appearance improvements. There was also the GVC with a glass sunroof, the GVL with minor trim and upholstery upgrades, and finally the GVX with the 1,300-cc engine, five-speed manual transmission, and standard equipment including a plush interior, ground-effects package, alloy wheels, and rally lights. The Cabrio convertible was introduced in 1988.

The Yugo was vigorously marketed in the late 1980s as a car that would fit into everybody's life, providing basic economical and reliable transportation along the lines of the Volkswagen Beetle and the earlier Ford Model T. The car was promoted as a uniquely affordable new vehicle — providing an option for buyers who would otherwise have chosen a used vehicle — and as a reliable second car for wealthier buyers. The Yugo carried the tagline "Everybody Needs A Yugo Sometime." This marketing appealed successfully to its target market of low-budget new car buyers, as well as wealthier people looking for an affordable second or third car. A popular ad included the 39-90 campaign, a play on the $3,990 price of the car.

In the late 1980s, an automatic transmission was being sourced from Renault and a larger model (named the "Florida") had been styled by Giorgetto Giugiaro and was in the early manufacturing stages. With the end of communism, however, Yugoslavia began to unravel.

By 1990, the GV, GVL, and the 1,100-cc engine and four-speed manual transmission were replaced by a 1,300-cc OHC engine and five-speed manual transmission or a Renault-designed three-speed automatic transmission, and an air conditioner with a holder for cooling two soft drink cans became optional on the GVX model. The standard model became the GV Plus.

A pickup prototype was developed for the US market.

Advertisement for the Yugo in the American market

In 1990, Yugo America introduced a fuel-injected version of the Yugo GVX to replace the primitive carbureted engine, but it arrived too late as the result of a recall by the United States Environmental Protection Agency of over 126,000 vehicles sold in the United States because they violated emissions regulations. The recall effectively caused Yugo America to cease importation and fold in April 1992. The noncompliant emission system used a carburetor of outdated design, an old-fashioned two-way catalytic converter with an air pump, and exhaust gas recirculation. The power-reducing application of this primitive emissions control equipment on an already-weak engine was one of the major problems that caused the vehicles to get a reputation for poor drivability.

By the early 1990s, the effects of United Nations sanctions on Yugoslavia forced Zastava to withdraw the car from every export market. After embargoes stifled production, the coup de grâce was NATO's 1999 bombing of the company's automotive division, instead of Zastava's arms manufacturing division. Only in 2000 could production be restarted and not until 2003 was the Florida launched.

Malcolm Bricklin signed a deal with Zastava in 2002 to bring the Yugo back to the U.S. with a model tentatively called the ZMW. Under Bricklin's direction, Zastava Motor Works USA expected to sell 60,000 cars in 2003. However, Bricklin instead turned to marketing the Chery line of Chinese cars. Bricklin's foray into importing and marketing Chery cars from China folded in mid- to late 2006 when Bricklin could not come up with the investment required to fund United States-specification vehicles from Chery.

United States sales by calendar year:

1985	1986	1987	1988	1989	1990	1991	1992	Total
3,895	35,959	48,812	31,546	10,576	6,359	3,092	1,412	141,651

=== In the UK ===
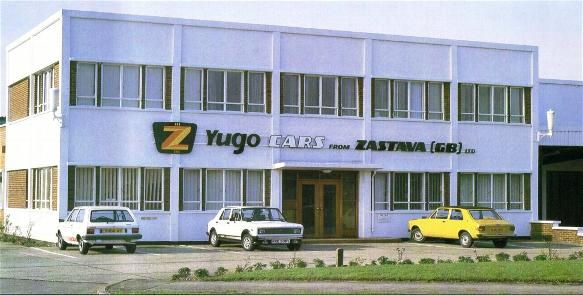
Zastava (GB) LTD Headquarters, Reading

Zastava Cars Limited (GB) set up its headquarters at Basingstoke Road in Reading, Berkshire, in 1981, and the first cars seen by British motorists were the 1100/1300 series in the autumn of that year, badged as Zastava ZLC (five-door) and Zastava ZLM (three-door). These cars were based upon the Fiat 128 which had been voted European car of the year in 1969. The Kragujevac factory produced faithful copies of the 128 saloon, known as the Zastava 128 (Osmica) and then from 1971 also began production of the Zastava 101. The legendary “Stojadin” was a Fiat 128 with a redesigned rear which was available in three- and five-door hatchback versions. In 1982–1983, as sales slowly improved, Zastava Cars Limited introduced special trim levels in the form of the "Mediterranean" and the "Caribbean". The United Kingdom market (and from 1985 to 1992 the Republic of Ireland) were the only markets catered for right-hand drive versions.

By the time the first British users were adjusting to their new Yugoslav machines, attention in Yugoslavia had moved away from the Stojadin towards the new “Yugo” series which began production in October 1980 and appeared on British roads from 1983 onwards. The "Type 102" answered a call for a more compact, economical family car with a hatchback. The "Type 102" morphed into the early production Yugo 45 with a 903 cc engine, later into the 55 with a 1,116 cc engine and then the more powerful 65 fitted with a 1,301 cc engine also became available in the British market. The new Yugo competed with indigenous cars such as the Austin Mini-Metro and Ford Fiesta MK1/MK2, captive imports such as the Vauxhall Nova (Opel Corsa A), and French models like the Citroën Visa and Talbot Samba.

In 1984 only, Zastava (GB) LTD imported small numbers of the Zastava 128. After that, with the company's branding altered to "Yugo Cars", relegating the Zastava name to the small print, Zastava (GB) LTD concentrated on selling the 101 range, branded as Yugo 311/313/511/513, and the 45/55/65 series. The cars sold steadily throughout the decade, and though they managed to avoid the dreadful reviews reserved for Lada and FSO, commentators in the British motoring press were rarely more than lukewarm in their praise of the car: a headline from 1986 read "The Yugo 55 is a good small car, but would you be seen in one?"

In 1988, Zastava launched the first of its new "Florida" range, envisaged as a long-term replacement for the ageing Stojadin. Styled by Giorgetto Guigiaro, the car was a modern design for the time, and bore more than a passing resemblance to the Citroën ZX. The Florida, marketed as the "Sana" in the United Kingdom, first appeared in Britain in 1990 and seemed set to fare well with positive early reviews. The Stojadin range ceased to be exported to the United Kingdom in 1991, with sales of the Sana under way.

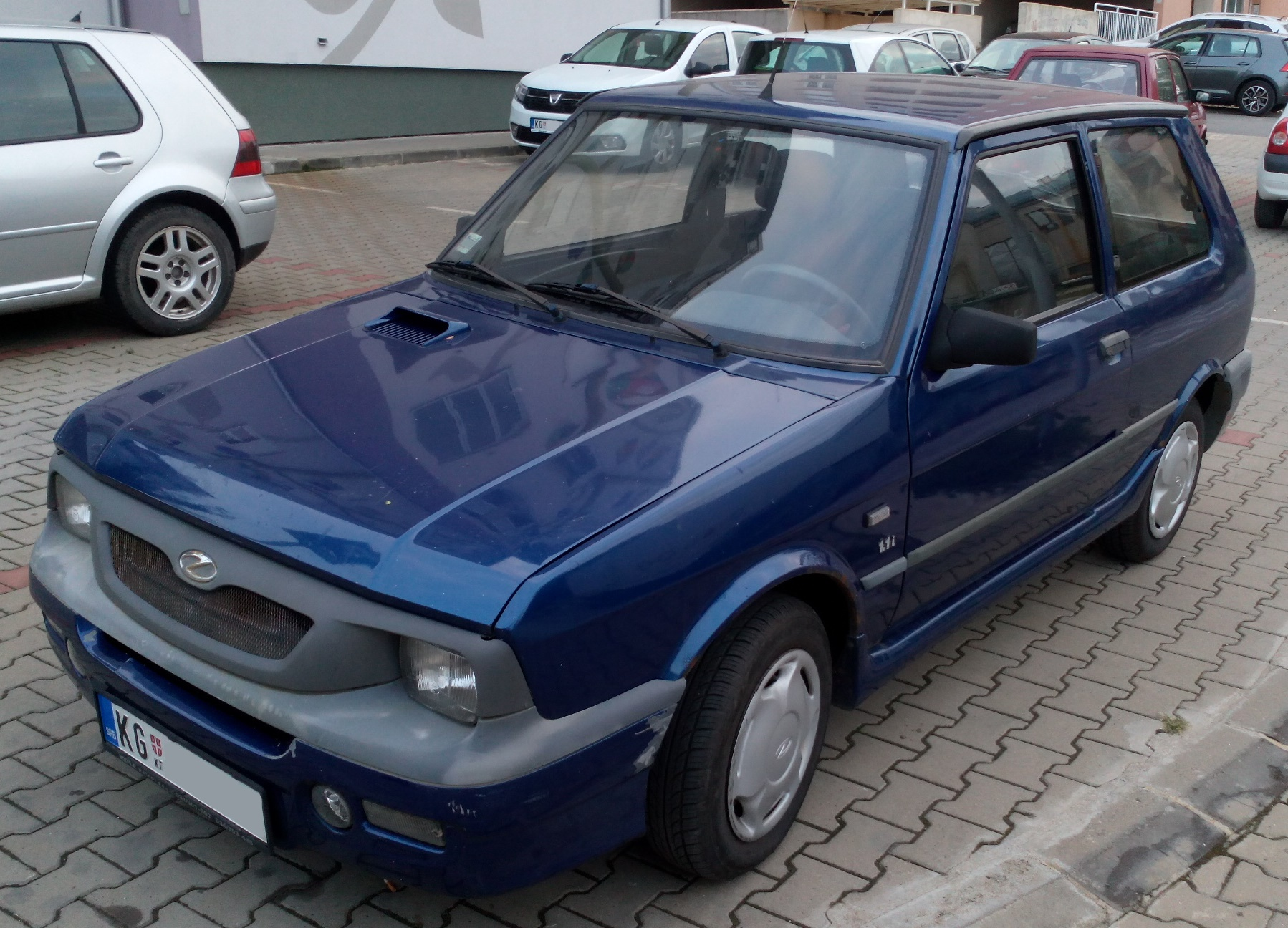
Late-model Zastava Koral In

The Sana might conceivably have established Yugo as a fixture in the United Kingdom market in the 1990s, but political developments left any such prospect unrealized. As the events of the wars of Yugoslav succession (1991–95 and 1999) unfolded, Zastava (GB) LTD became a barely noticed casualty. Supplies of vehicles to the United Kingdom were, however, reduced to a trickle in 1991 and 1992 and with the imposition of United Nations sanctions on Slobodan Milošević's rump Yugoslavia consisting of Serbia and Montenegro, the company folded in 1993. The remaining Yugos on dealer forecourts were sold at drastically reduced prices or written off altogether as economically unviable.

=== 1991–1996 ===
By the end of the 1980s, Yugoslavia was on the brink of a disintegration that many anticipated under the leadership of Josip Broz Tito. Because the Yugo was built as a "Yugoslav" car, with political problems and Yugoslav Wars breaking out in 1991, this had direct implications for the company at Kragujevac: production slowed down and the supply of parts was interrupted. Most of the plastics and the interior came from Croatia, while the alternators and electrical equipment came from Slovenia. With the start of civil war, economic and transportation ties were broken, resulting in shortage of most parts coming from the two seceded republics. The seats and rear trunk-struts came via Kosovo which also underwent a period of turmoil. The disintegration of the Yugoslav federation suddenly had supplies dry up at Kragujevac and production rates declined steeply.

Zastava continued to produce vehicles for the Yugoslav and European markets until exports were limited by sanctions imposed by the United Nations in the 1990s. When the political instability in Yugoslavia intensified in early 1992, Zastava was forced to stop exports.

Though the sanctions were not in place until May 1992, Yugos built between June 1991 and early 1996 were built with a variety of "leftover" parts: as an example, getting a car with a blue dashboard and a brown steering wheel, seats that were mismatched in color, and most likely an "American" instrument cluster with speeds printed in MPH rather than km/h, and with written labels like water and oil instead of small drawings, and a seatbelt safety warning light were possible. In some extreme cases, the car would come with different interior panels and a steering wheel from other Zastava products such as the Zastava 750. When exports to United States (and the rest of the world) stopped, a number of federalized Yugos were still left in the factory's parking lots, and many people got these "American" Yugos instead of the European ones.

When Yugoslavia broke apart in the early 1990s, production rates steeply declined to 14,000 in 1992, 7,000 in 1993 and 1994, and 9,000 in 1995.

One version of the Yugo, the automatic version, is increasingly rare and estimates say that around 20 are left in use in Serbia, and most of those were sold in 1992, just after the sanctions were imposed, fetching a large value on auctions. A small number of newer Yugos can be found with automatic transmissions, and they were mostly built by request and featured a 1.3 liter engine.

=== 1996 to the end of production ===
In 1996, when sanctions against Serbia and Montenegro were lifted, production rates slowly increased as living standards in the country started to improve. Even so, problems for the factory started once again when it was put out of production in mid-1999 as a result of the NATO bombing of Serbia. During Easter 1999, the Zastava factory in Kragujevac was targeted by NATO forces, and whilst severely damaged, it was not put out of action.

In 2000, the car received a new front fascia with new bumpers, rear spoiler, a redesigned dashboard, and seats. The latest changes were in 2007, with the introduction of a new instrument cluster.

One popular upgrade is an autogas conversion which has gained widespread popularity in Serbia. Because most Yugos do not feature fuel injection, converting them to LPG is cheap and easy, and is paid off very quickly. One drawback of such conversions is that an already small trunk becomes almost useless, since an LPG tank takes up space. Such converted cars achieve better reliability since use of an unreliable gasoline pump is avoided. However, some cars have starting problems in very cold weather, because of improper LPG installation.

In 2006, various models were available in the former Yugoslavia, including an agreement signed with Fiat for the production of the 2003 Fiat Punto model. With the 794,428th sold Yugo being the last, production ended on November 11, 2008. Of that number, around 250,000 were exported to various countries.

=== Since the end of production ===
Almost 4 years after its demise, the Yugo was still a common sight in Serbia, with almost 60,000 vehicles still in use, most of which were built in the 2000s. Parts were still readily available at most auto-parts stores and in scrapyards across the country. They were also common in North Macedonia and Montenegro near the end of its production. However, Yugos have been rare in other former Yugoslav republics, particularly in Croatia where a total of only 3,040 Zastava cars were registered in 2020 and Slovenia, because most of them were "imported" back to Serbia in the early 2000s, most likely because most of them were in good shape for their age.

In the United States, a total of 408 Yugos were still in service as of 2021, likely because of international sanctions imposed on Yugoslavia in the early 1990s, which limited the supply of spare parts and service locations. The United Kingdom has 14 Yugos left that are still on the road as of 2022 (although 12 of these are registered as Zastava).

=== Revival ===
In 2025, the rights to the Yugo brand were secured by university professor Dr Aleksandar Bjelić, who partnered with Serbian designer Darko Marčeta to reveal a modern Yugo with a retro design inspired by the original. The next-generation Yugo is planned to be revealed at the 2027 Belgrade Expo and will be positioned as an affordable entry-level hatchback powered by a petrol engine.

== Reception ==
Along with other Central and Eastern European vehicles marketed in the West during the 20th century—such as the Škoda—the Yugo was subjected to derision by critics who pointed to its use of old-generation Fiat technology and to alleged issues with build quality and reliability. The Yugo was voted as Car Talk's worst car of the millennium. Similarly, the Yugo GV was listed on Time's "The 50 Worst Cars of All Time" list, and the Yugo 45 ranked No. 1 on Complex Magazine's "The 50 Worst Cars of the '80s" list. Various other critics have added the Yugo to their lists of the worst cars.

On May 1987, Popular Science gave the Yugo a mixed review, noting the low base price, the somewhat cramped interior, and lack of air conditioning. The Yugo was tested alongside the Ford Festiva, Hyundai Excel, Pontiac Lemans, Subaru Justy, and Volkswagen Fox, where it emerged as the best performer in the braking tests, while the handling and maneuverability were described as "respectable". The only negative aspects of the car were the poor acceleration and the noise, while the ride was described as choppy even on smooth roads.

According to a Popular Mechanics survey conducted in 1987, reception was mixed in the United States with the majority of owners praising the low cost, though only 42.4% stated they would buy a Yugo again. Over half thought the worksmanship was good while less than a quarter described it as excellent. "That's not a great testimonial, but we've often surveyed more expensive cars that came off no better," the article noted. 57.2% of Yugo owners reported having mechanical troubles while dealer repair services were rated as fair to poor. Some owners also reported that the brakes squealed, shifting gears was hard on the Yugo, the 8.5 US gallons (32 L; 7.1 imp gal) gas tank was considered too small with a hard to remove gas cap, while others pointed out that the Yugo had some features that other contemporary basic cars didn't have by default, including reclining front bucket seats, fold-down rear seats, rear window defroster, temperature gauge, and a low-fuel warning light.

One critical maintenance issue specific to the Yugo 55 and 65 (the 45 was a 903 cc pushrod engine, with a timing chain) was the need for regular replacement of the interference engine's timing belt — every 40,000 miles (64,000 km) according to the owner's manual. Very few US customers took heed of this recommendation, resulting in breakdowns that dealerships refused to fix. An owner told Popular Mechanics that their dealership charged $75 (equivalent to $213 in 2025) for a copy of the manual, while others complained of price gouging on spare parts.

In the former Yugoslav republics the Yugo had a more positive reception, where is usually seen as "a symbol of unity and joint effort for the multiethnic state that was Yugoslavia", cheap to repair, and a car that managed to enter the United States market. The Yugo was commonly driven in Croatia, but by 2008 they were largely replaced by Western-made cars; it was still commonly found on the roads of Bosnia and Herzegovina and region as of 2016. In Serbia, the Yugo is mostly driven by the elderly, though it also have garnered a cult following amongst Gen Z Serbians, who collect and refit them to take them into rallies or offer rides to tourists.

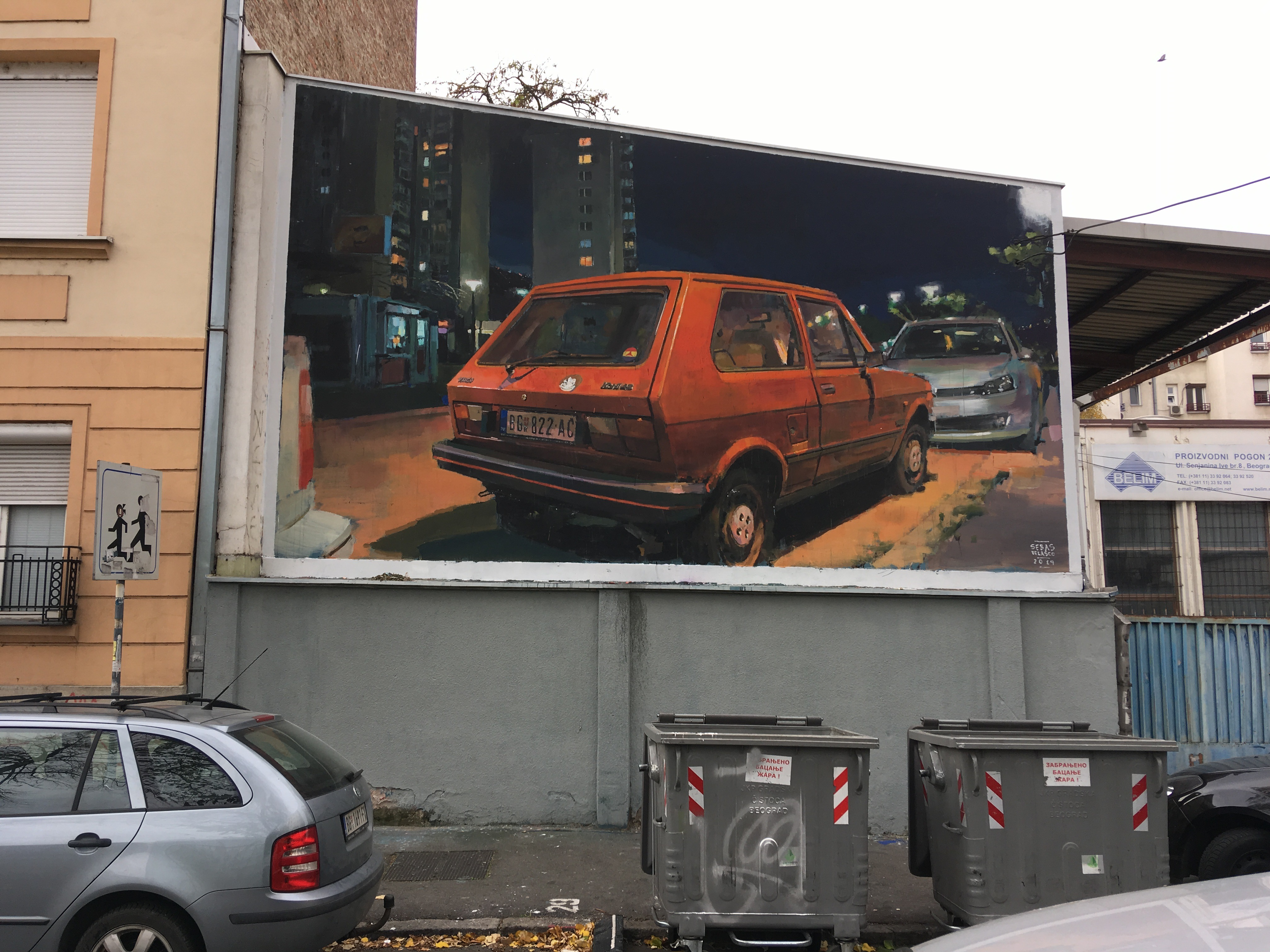
Yugo mural in Belgrade, Serbia

== In popular culture ==
The car has achieved a symbolic status in former Yugoslavian countries due to the simplicity, reliability, and overall cheap price, and the Yugoslavian mentality of people regularly fixing their own cars instead of servicing them at their local garage. They have been featured in many fictional works in the region, largely owing to how common they were and are in various roles. They are still very popular and are a common sight in former Yugoslavian countries, and the large number of parts available make it easily repairable.

In stark contrast, in the United States, the car was frequently subjected to ridicule and mockery and it has a universally negative rating. Car Talk has rated it the "worst car of the millennium", and many car magazines and TV shows rate it as the worst car of the 1980s and also one of the worst cars ever made. Despite the very low price setting in the U.S. (with Yugo being the cheapest new car ever sold in the U.S. when adjusted for inflation), it was ridiculed for the overall ugly design, poor quality, and large number of technical issues. Many American Yugos had faulty designs that were stressed in owners' manuals to be regularly serviced, but this caused even more ridicule due to owners overlooking these issues. The car has become a sort of a symbol for a lemon car. The car was also featured in many TV shows and films, satirizing the car's poor design (the most famous examples being a rusty beige Yugo GV featured in Die Hard with a Vengeance, and a taxi-yellow Yugo in Nick & Norah's Infinite Playlist).

One was featured in season 5 episode 7 of Moonlighting as a gift of a "Practical" car for Dave Addison which met its ignominious end in an open grave.

A Yugo is prominently featured as an unmarked police car in the 1987 film Dragnet. In a voiceover, Dan Aykroyd identifies it as a 1987 model, and states it was the only vehicle the Los Angeles Police Department was willing to issue his character after his previous two cars were destroyed. He describes the car as "the cutting edge of Serbo-Croatian technology."

In the plot of the 2000 film Drowning Mona, every resident of Verplanck, New York is shown to drive Yugos because Zastava (called "the Yugo car company" in the film) chose the town for testing before its official launch on the U.S. market.

In 1996, Jeremy Clarkson drives a Yugo in the show Clarkson: Unleashed on Cars. He calls it "a hateful, hateful car" and disparages its performance as being so bad "you get overtaken by wildlife". In the end, he destroys it by shooting it with a tank.

A Yugo is prominently featured in the music video for the 2008 song "The Day That Never Comes" by Metallica.

In the 2011 animated film Cars 2, Yugos (called "Hugos" in the film) are shown to be members of the Lemons, a criminal syndicate consisting of lemon cars who seek revenge against other cars for the perception that lemons have poor performance and reliability.

In the 2011 film Good Luck Charlie, It's Christmas!, Teddy and Amy Duncan rent a Yugo for $50. Amy describes the car as "10 years older than [Teddy]" and "made in a country that no longer exists."

In the 2018 animated film Spider-Man: Into the Spider-Verse, a fictional modern version of the Yugo is advertised in Times Square.

== See also ==
- Zastava Florida (also known as Yugo Sana)
- Zastava Skala (also known as Zastava 101)
- Zastava 10
- Zastava 750
