= Visionary Vehicles =

North American vehicle import company

Visionary Vehicles, LLC
- Industry: Automotive
- Founder: Malcolm Bricklin
- Headquarters: New York City, New York, U.S.
- Products: Automobiles
- Website: vvcars.com

V Cars. LLC, called Visionary Vehicles prior to mid-2008, was an international automobile import and distribution company, founded by Malcolm Bricklin and engaging in the development and sale of Chinese-made motor vehicles in North America. The company closed down prior to ever importing any cars to North America.

== Chery distribution ==
V Cars was to be the North American distributor of Chery Automobiles. Bricklin's foray with Chery ended in mid-2006 after Chery allegedly used the relationship to enter the US market, then backed out of the contract with VV.

In a documentary film (The Entrepreneur) made by his son Johnathan, Malcolm Bricklin is shown with his lawyer in litigation against Chery auto makers.

Bricklin's strategy was to bring in cars and crossover SUVs that were competitive with German brands (Audi especially), but priced similarly to Honda vehicles. The lineup was to start with a mid-size car, a sporty coupé and small crossover. Later, with Bricklin funding, a bespoke line of front-wheel-drive vehicles was to have been developed. Following the front wheel drive vehicles, a rear wheel drive platform was contemplated which would have pushed Visionary into the Audi/BMW/Mercedes class of vehicles.

Bricklin's distribution strategy was to have dealers invest in Visionary Vehicles and in Chery, different from traditional dealer-distributor-manufacturer relationships. The dealer investments of $2-million were to be put in an escrow account until being used to fund investments in products from Chery.

All dealer-investors and other investing parties are suing Chery auto makers in China for breach of contract and several other categories of litigation for over $1 billion.

In July 2013, VCars LLC was awarded $2,000,000 by a Detroit jury in US district court.

== Plug-in hybrids ==
Visionary intended to bring a $35,000 luxury Mercedes-Benz S-Class-style V2G-capable PHEV to market around 2010. In 2007, VV announced it would compete for the X-Prize.

== Bricklin EVX/LS ==
The Bricklin EVX/LS was a planned plug-in hybrid electric 4-door, 5-passenger luxury sedan.

The EVX/LS would go from zero to sixty miles per hour in 5.9 seconds with an 850-mile range at 100 mpg. The fuel would be a hybrid of gasoline and electricity powered by a lithium-ion battery.

Visionary Vehicles was looking to charge around $35,000 and premiere the vehicle in production in 2010. It was never built.

== Bricklin 3EV ==
The Bricklin 3EV is a three-wheel, two-passenger, completely enclosed vehicle that is entirely electric powered for zero emissions. The projected retail cost of the vehicle will be between $25,000 and $30,000. While marketed as a direct competitor with Tesla, Inc., multiple discussed plans include usage of Tesla supplies in the production process. To maintain collectibility of the vehicles, the exterior design will be significantly altered every 50,000 units produced.

== See also ==
- Bricklin SV-1
