= Malcolm Bricklin =

American businessman (born 1939)

Malcolm N. Bricklin
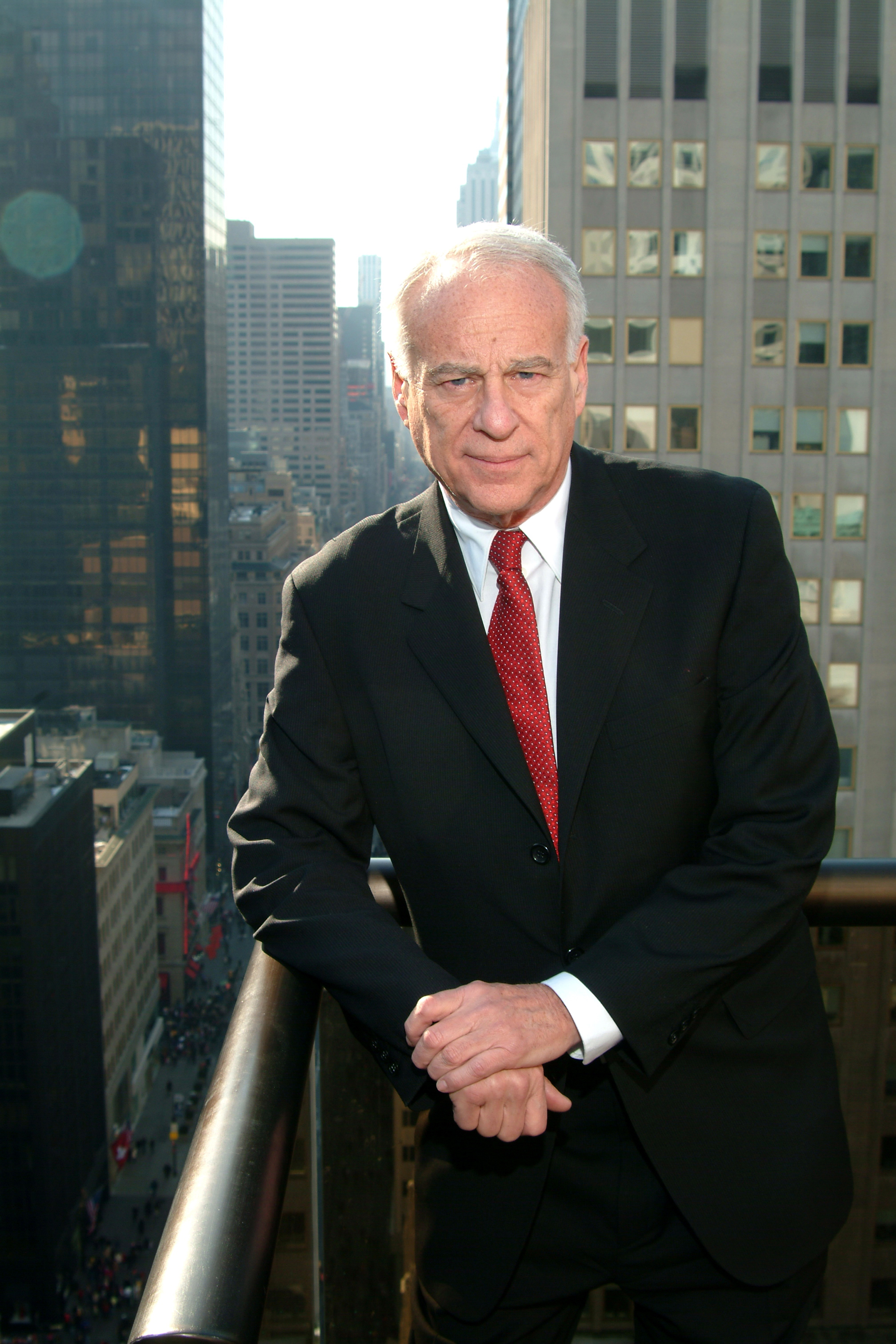
- Bricklin in 2007
- Born: March 9, 1939 (age 87); Philadelphia, Pennsylvania, U.S.
- Education: University of Florida
- Occupation: Businessman
- Known for: His self-named automobile company, importer of foreign cars
- Spouse: Sania Teymeny

Malcolm N. Bricklin (born March 9, 1939) is an American businessman, widely known for an unorthodox career spanning more than six decades, with numerous prominent failures and successes — primarily manufacturing or importing automobiles to the United States, ultimately starting over 30 companies throughout the course of his business career.

After franchising his father's hardware stores at age 19, Bricklin founded Subaru of America, Inc. in 1968, founded General Vehicles to manufacture the Bricklin SV-1 (1974–76), imported and marketed Fiat X1/9 and Fiat 124 Sport Spider (1982), imported and marketed under the name Yugo the Zastava Koral hatchback from the then-Yugoslavia (1985−92), manufactured and marketed an electric bicycle as the EV Warrior (1982), and contracted to import and distribute vehicles made by the Chinese company Chery (2004). In 2017, at age 78, he promoted a plan to transform high-end car dealers into high-end art dealers, after becoming interested in the business aspect of art.

== Background ==
Born March 9, 1939, in Philadelphia to Jewish parents, Mr. Bricklin had one of his first jobs stretching hides in his family's furrier shop. He grew up in Orlando, Florida, graduating from Boone High School in 1956. Bricklin said that as a child, he never liked to eat; "stopping to eat meant I had to stop playing."

"The things that people see as failures are often the steps to success. I got my fame and power from the failure of the Bricklin."

Malcom Bricklin

At the height of his success, he owned a desert ranch in Scottsdale, Arizona, and a 5,000-acre home in the Colorado Rockies with an indoor shooting range, a riverfront swimming pool, helipad, and pet camel.

Bricklin has six sons. As of 2017, he has been divorced three times, and lives in Monroe, New York with his wife, artist Sania Teymeny.

== Career ==
=== Handyman America ===
Bricklin built his father's Orlando, Florida, building-supply business into a franchised chain at age 19. Named Handyman America and open seven days a week, Bricklin left behind his interest in 1960 after dozens of lawsuits and judgments stemming from the chain, — shortly before the chain's bankruptcy.

=== Subaru ===
In the mid-1960s, after he sold his interest in Handyman, Bricklin moved back to Philadelphia. When he was exploring establishing a network of gas stations that would rent scooters, he went to Japan to meet with the manufacturer of the Rabbit scooter, Fuji Heavy Industries, to arrange for the purchase and importation of their scooters — at a time when Fuji was just getting out of manufacturing scooters and was concentrating on their automotive business.

At the meeting, Bricklin saw Fuji’s Subaru 360 minicar, which got up to 60 miles to a gallon of gas and did not require federalizing in the United States because it weighed under 1,000 pounds. He was able to secure an exclusive contract with Fuji Heavy Industries to import Subaru cars and trucks into the United States, forming Subaru of America. Despite the car's ill fit for American roads and traffic, Bricklin was described as "one of the first auto-industry mavericks to recognize that thrifty, inexpensive Japanese cars could be big in the United States."

The first Subarus to enter the US were the 1968-1969 Subaru 360 and the 1970 Subaru FF-1 Star.

Less than six months after the company formed, it became a public company and has been from 1968. Subaru of America became the only import car company that was publicly traded, making small fortunes for Bricklin and COO Harvey Lamm.

=== FasTrack ===
In 1971, Bricklin created a franchise named FasTrack, combining RV sales with shopping-center parking-lot race courses, where the public could drive one of 900 unsold Subaru 360s, modified by Bruce Myers. The venture ultimately failed.

=== Bricklin SV-1 ===
Bricklin subsequently founded his own car company, General Vehicle, manufacturing the Bricklin SV-1 two-seat, gull-wing door, sports car — informally called the Bricklin.

"SV" stood for "safety vehicle", and Bricklin applied standards ahead of those the US government was requiring in the 1970s, including exceeding US crash-protection standards. The SV-1 protected occupants with a tubular-steel perimeter frame, roll cage, and chassis capable of withstanding a high-velocity impact without deformation. The car did not include a cigarette lighter or ashtray, as Bricklin viewed smoking while driving as unsafe.

The Bricklin featured a vacuum-forming process with color-impregnated acrylic bonded to fiberglass body panels. The car garnered mostly positive coverage from consumer media. In Car & Driver's comparison test, a '75 Bricklin with the Ford engine proved to be nearly a match for a '75 Corvette in every performance category—and the Bricklin's power-operated gullwing doors maxed out the "coefficient of cool" metric. Car and Driver concluded that despite some build-quality and ergonomic deficiencies, and a price disadvantage, the Bricklin was "a tangible threat to the Corvette."

Intended for the US market, the Bricklin SV1s were manufactured in Canada in the province of New Brunswick, which sought to address its unemployment, nearing 25% in the mid-’70s. New Brunswick Premier Richard Hatfield supported the province’s involvement in the Bricklin venture as a way of establishing a manufacturing base that could provide steady, high-paying jobs and attract interest in the province through the publicity the car provided.

Production began in mid-1974 and continued through late 1975, employing over 1200 people in the Saint John and Minto, New Brunswick, plants. In September 1975, after building 2,854 cars, and General Vehicles having set up over 400 US automobile dealers with 40,000 back orders, the province refused to provide further financial assistance and forced the company into receivership.

=== International Automobile Importers (IAI) ===
After Fiat left the U.S. market, Bricklin created International Automobile Importers (IAI) in 1982 to import the Fiat X1/9 and 2000 roadster, renaming them the Bertone and the Pininfarina Azzurra.

The company was profitable, but when Cadillac subsequently made a joint venture with Pininfarina, IAI was told that Cadillac did not want a $14,000 Pininfarina being sold next to its $55,000 Pininfarina-manufactured Allanté — and gave IAI six months before they cancelled production of the cars.

=== Yugo, Global Motors ===
Seeking to import a simple, low-cost car to the U.S. market, Bricklin was introduced to Zastava Automobiles, manufactured in Kragujevac, Yugoslavia, – now Serbia. Zastava had produced cars since 1953 under a license from the Italian company Fiat. In 1984, the entire Yugoslav car industry produced 236,000 cars, 58,000 of which were exported.

Bricklin, senior advisor Henry Kissinger, former U.S. Undersecretary of State and Yugo board member Lawrence Eagleburger, and Global Motors executives met with Zastava. Bricklin agreed to import the Zastava Koral, marketing it as the Yugo.

Bricklin and his engineers suggested some 600 changes for the U.S. market, including a 1.1-liter, four-cylinder engine, improvements in the antipollution system, comfort adjustments, safety devices, and special carburetors for lead-free gasoline. In addition to the main Kragujevac complex, about 200 smaller Yugoslav factories manufactured parts for the cars.

Bricklin had his own people at the plant to monitor the effort, stressing high quality. A team of British quality experts sent a cadre to Kragujevac to study the factory and recommend improvements.

The first shipment of the Yugos arrived via ship from Bar, Montenegro, in Baltimore, Maryland, in July 1985.

The Yugo was the fastest-selling car ever in the US from Europe, 163,000 in three years, and was the least-expensive new car sold in the United States.

At first, five models of Yugo were marketed in the United States for model year 1987 - the basic entry-level $3,990-($9,363.69 in 2020) GV (for "Great Value"), the GVC with a glass sunroof, the nearly identical GVL and GVS with minor trim and upholstery upgrades, and the sportier GVX with the 1300 cc engine, five-speed manual transmission, and standard equipment including a plush interior, ground-effects package, alloy wheels, rally lights, and a center high-mount stop lamp. The Cabrio convertible was introduced in 1988.

Bricklin sold his interest in Yugo in 1988 for $20 million. On May 30, 1992, United Nations sanctions were imposed, severing Yugoslavia from world trade.

The effects of the United Nations sanctions on Yugoslavia forced Zastava to withdraw the car from every export market. After embargoes stifled production, NATO bombed the company's automotive facilities in 1999, instead of its munitions division.

The Yugo was subject to derision by critics who pointed to its use of older Fiat technology. It was voted Car Talk's worst car of the millennium. Defenders argued that Yugo's reputation suffered when owners failed to perform basic maintenance. Popular Mechanics surveyed 1,000 Yugo buyers and published the report in June 1987. 78% described workmanship as good to excellent, 25% giving an unqualified excellent, 5% said poor; 42.4% said they would buy a Yugo again, and 36% said maybe they would buy again.

=== Electric vehicles ===
In the 1990s, Bricklin turned his attention to producing environmentally friendly vehicles. He studied battery technology and formed an electric-vehicle company. Bricklin electric vehicles were the wave of the future, a notion that appeared to be ahead of its time.

After trying to get electric cars off the ground for a time, Bricklin formed a partnership with Dr. Malcolm Currie, the former chairman and CEO of Hughes Aircraft, GM Delco and former Undersecretary of Defense for Research and Engineering. In Bricklin and Currie’s view, an electric bike was a promising first step to winning people over to the idea of electric cars. California had just enacted the Zero Emission Vehicle (ZEV) regulation in 1990, which mandated 3% of a vehicle manufacturer's products would have to be zero-emission (electric) by the year 2000. An electric bike that could be sold through dealerships seemed like a perfect way to address the requirements of the ZEV mandate.

Bricklin and Currie formed the Electric Bicycle Company and produced the first EV Warriors by late 1993. The electric bike was initially built using a custom aluminum mountain-bike frame from Zimmark Corporation in Malaysia. Later versions used a Giant frame produced in Taiwan. All versions used a six-speed Shimano rear derailleur with GripShift handlebar controller. The rider could pedal unaided by the motors, or could activate them with a thumb switch on the handle bar. That smoothly, quietly and quickly took the bike to 15-20 mph depending on the size of the rider, with a range of about 17 miles before it needed a charge.

The EV Warrior came in seven colors, resembling a mountain bike with a large box behind the seat that straddled the rear wheel. Inside the box were two 24-volt electric motors powered by two rechargeable, sealed, 12-volt, lead-acid batteries. The bike used advanced technology for the time, with halogen headlights and LED taillights and brake lights, and offered options such as a wireless security remote fob, LED turn signals in the mirrors, and a front disc brake. The suggested retail price was $1,400 to $1,900, depending on options. This was roughly one-third the price of an inexpensive new car, and even a youth-oriented marketing campaign that included a superhero comic book (The EV Warriors) failed to generate enough interest. The company filed for bankruptcy in 1996. When the company folded, Electric Bicycle company was purchased by Lee Iacocca, who renamed the company EV Global. That company no longer exists. Currie later founded Currie Cruisers and co-founded Real Spirit USA, to further develop the electric bicycles.

=== Chery ===
Beginning in 2002, Bricklin embarked on a three-year journey around the world to find a manufacturing partner to help him create a value brand in the US, examining the United Kingdom, India, and Poland; after seeing their factory and meeting the executive staff, he decided to enter into an importation agreement with Chery Automobile Company, which is located in the Anhui Province of China and owned by the Provincial Anhui Government.

Visionary Vehicles (now named VCars, LLC) entered into a joint venture in December 2004 to import five different models of cars into North America. Bricklin staffed an engineering office in Detroit to direct the changes required to meet and exceed safety and homologation requirements in the United States.

He established a dealer network in the United States and Canada.

Bricklin hired consultants, advisors, and employees with financial and automotive experience, including Allen & Company; Atlantic Pacific Capital; Ambassador van den Heuvel, former US ambassador to the United Nations; Maurice Strong, former United Nations undersecretary; Ron Harbour, of Harbour Consultants, international automobile factory evaluators; Marianne McInerney, former President of the International Automotive Dealers Association; and Per Arnberg, president of Fram Shipowning, LTD, an international shipping company.

Working with Atlantic Pacific Capital, he brought in George Soros, who put $200,000,000 in escrow to help bring Chery to the U.S. He also retained New York marketing and public-relations firms that generated worldwide exposure for Chery.

After spending two years and $26 million to bring Chery’s manufacturing capabilities up to international standards and to create awareness of Chery, Visionary Vehicles discovered that Chery was using Visionary Vehicle’s engineering staff to work on a project that involved Chrysler Corporation (which ultimately failed to materialize).

Shortly thereafter, Chery entered into an agreement with Quantum LLC, a subsidiary company of the Israel Corporation, brought in to help fund Visionary Vehicle’s participation in the joint venture with Chery. The agreement between Chery and Israel Corporation was done without Visionary Vehicle’s knowledge or approval, and excluded Visionary Vehicles.

Bricklin told Reuters, "We found out what was really going on behind our back at the end of '06 and we have been trying to get justice ever since. Dennis Gore, former Visionary Cars executive, used proprietary information to help Chery launch a joint venture with Quantum LLC.

Visionary Vehicles subsequently filed suits to recoup losses and collect damages from the failed deal. The lawsuit against Chery Automobile was arbitrated in Hong Kong and Visionary Vehicles received an award, subject to a confidentiality provision. Having discovered Dennis Gore’s role in undermining the joint venture with Chery, Visionary Vehicles also sued Gore in federal court, in Detroit, Michigan. A federal jury returned a verdict in favor of V Cars, LLC, finding that KCA Engineering LLC, controlled by Dennis Gore, committed fraud and other offenses and awarded $2 million in damages to Visionary Vehicles.

In 2022, Chery started selling cars in Mexico, but due to Bricklin owning the Chery trademark in North America, the name Chirey is used for the Mexican market instead of Chery.

=== Reviews ===
In 2005, The New York Times said Bricklin is "often likened to an automotive version of P. T. Barnum." In 2009, noted documentarian Morgan Spurlock said Bricklin "goes nonstop. He’s testosterone unleashed, a brilliant negotiator and an incredible character." In 2013, Rolling Stone described him as "brash, bombastic, and pathologically prone to betting the farm on pie-in-the-sky automotive endeavors." In 2017, Autoweek said Bricklin has "a mind that works like a machine gun." Keith Crain, publisher of Automotive News, said Bricklin is "like one of those toy clowns that when you punch it, it bounces right back up."

== See also ==
- Bricklin EVX/LS
- Bricklin SV-1
- Visionary Vehicles
