= Iveco Daily =

Commercial truck produced by Iveco

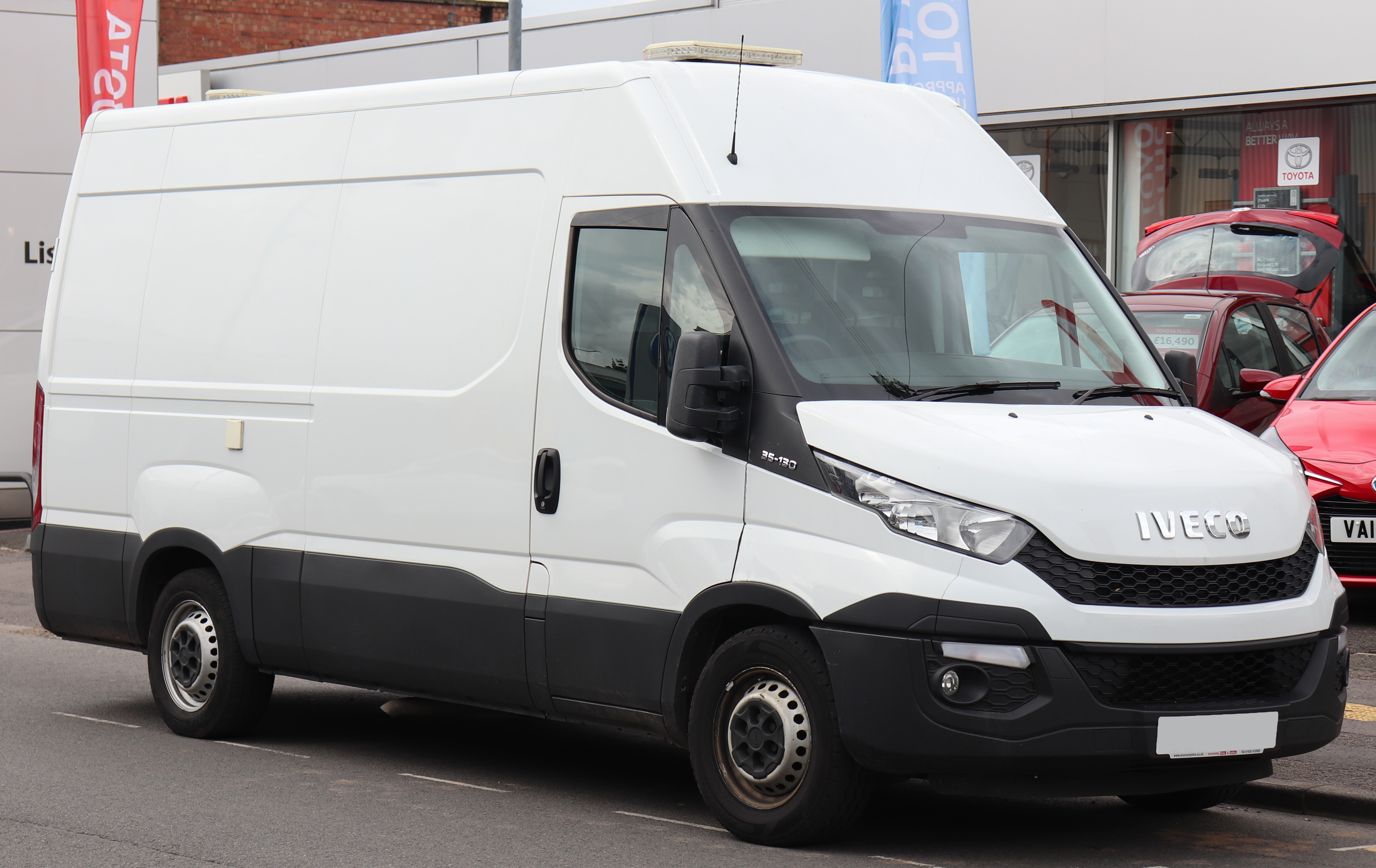

Overview
- Manufacturer: Iveco
- Production: 1978–present

Body and chassis
- Class: Light commercial vehicle/Van (M)
- Body style: Van; Minibus; Chassis cab
- Layout: Front-engine, rear-wheel drive Front-engine, four-wheel drive

Chronology
- Predecessor: Fiat 616N; Fiat 35/40 NC; Ford A series (Iveco-Ford Daily)
- Successor: Fiat Ducato (for Fiat Daily and other first generation rebadges)

The Iveco Daily is a large light commercial van produced by the Italian automaker Iveco since 1978; it was also sold as the Fiat Daily by Fiat until 1983. Unlike the more car-like unibody Fiat Ducato, the Daily uses a separate ladder frame typical of heavier commercial vehicles. The Iveco Daily is produced at the Iveco Suzzara plant, near Mantova in Italy, where Iveco has recently made substantial investments to renew the production lines.

The Daily is also the longest-running vehicle of the Iveco production and in over 40 years has sold over three million units. Today it is marketed in 110 markets around the world.

== First generation (1978) ==
=== Fiat Daily (1978) ===
Fiat Daily
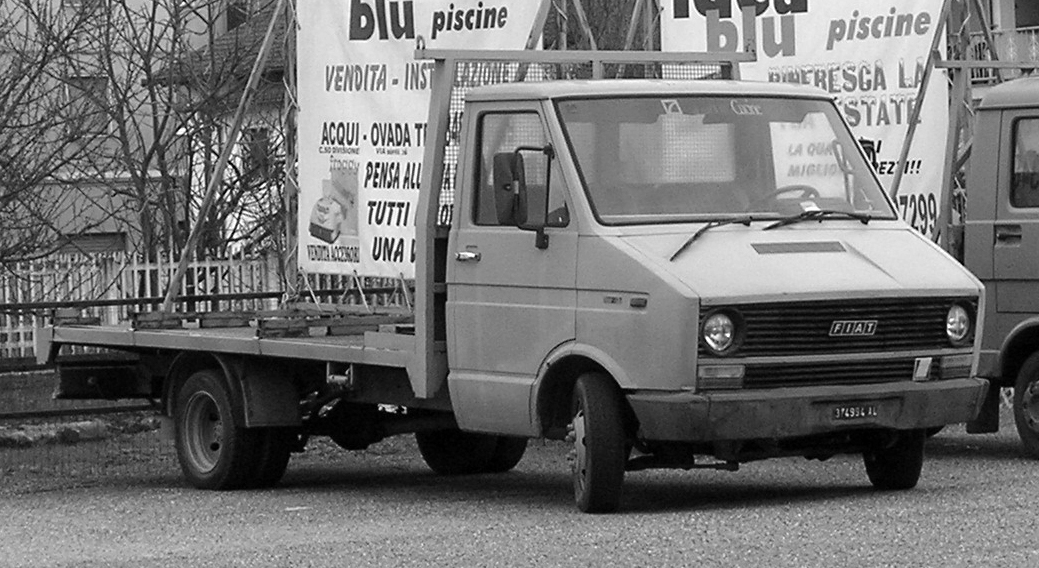
- Fiat Daily platform version

Overview
- Manufacturer: Fiat
- Also called: OM Grinta; Alfa Romeo AR8; Unic Daily; Magirus-Deutz Daily; Saurer Daily/Grinta
- Production: 1978–1985
- Assembly: Italy: Suzzara, Province of Mantua (Iveco SpA, Suzzara Plant); Spain (after 1991): Valladolid (Iveco España, SL, Valladolid Plant)

Body and chassis
- Body style: Van; Minibus; Pickup truck

Powertrain
- Engine: Diesel: 2.4L Fiat 8140.61
- Transmission: 5-speed manual

Chronology
- Predecessor: Fiat 616N; Fiat OM 40; Fiat 242

In 1978, Fiat presented a revolutionary vehicle called Daily. Light utility, succeeding the old Fiat 242 and Fiat 616N, it immediately received a very favorable reception from users, who appreciated its robustness and versatility. Its transformations for specific uses are numerous: panel van, chassis cab, double cab, etc.

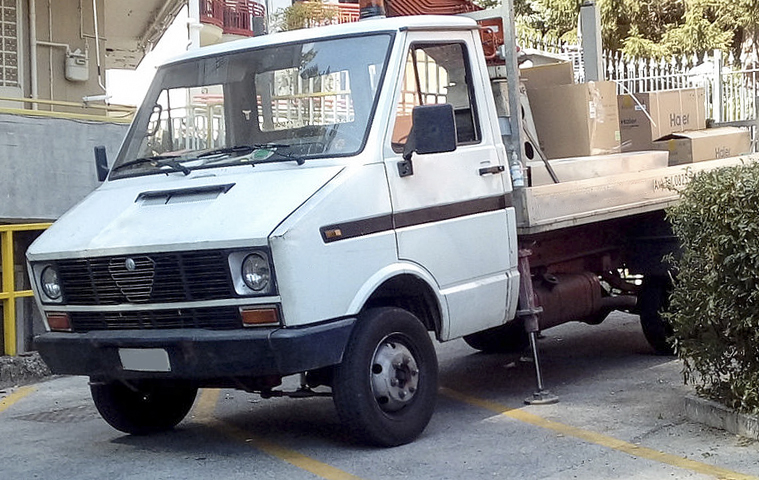
Alfa Romeo AR8 (front)

When presented, the Daily was marketed as the Fiat Daily, OM Grinta, and later the turbocharged version OM TurboGrinta, and Alfa Romeo AR8 in Italy, Unic Daily in France, Magirus Daily in Germany, and in Switzerland, these were also sold by Saurer-Fiat and Saurer-OM as the Daily/Grinta, with the small IVECO I logo at the bottom to the right of the grille, until 1982. Between 1982 and 1983, the IVECO logo prevails in the center of the grille, the Fiat or Unic brands being simply recalled at the bottom right.

When it was launched, the Daily range included 3 models: 30F8, 35F8 and 40F8. The first number represents the GVW of the vehicle expressed in Italian fashion, in quintals, i.e. 3.0, 3.5 and 4.0 tonnes. The "F" indicates FIAT, the engine manufacturer and the last digit corresponds to the engine power expressed in ten horsepower DIN.

Depending on its configuration, the useful volume of the long van version can reach 17 m3, which makes it a good successor to the Fiat 242 (Citroën C35 in France), whose production nevertheless continued.

In 1984, Fiat V.I., now IVECO, presented the Daily 4x4 range and, in 1985, launched the second Daily series, the TurboDaily.

=== Iveco TurboDaily (1985) ===
Iveco TurboDaily
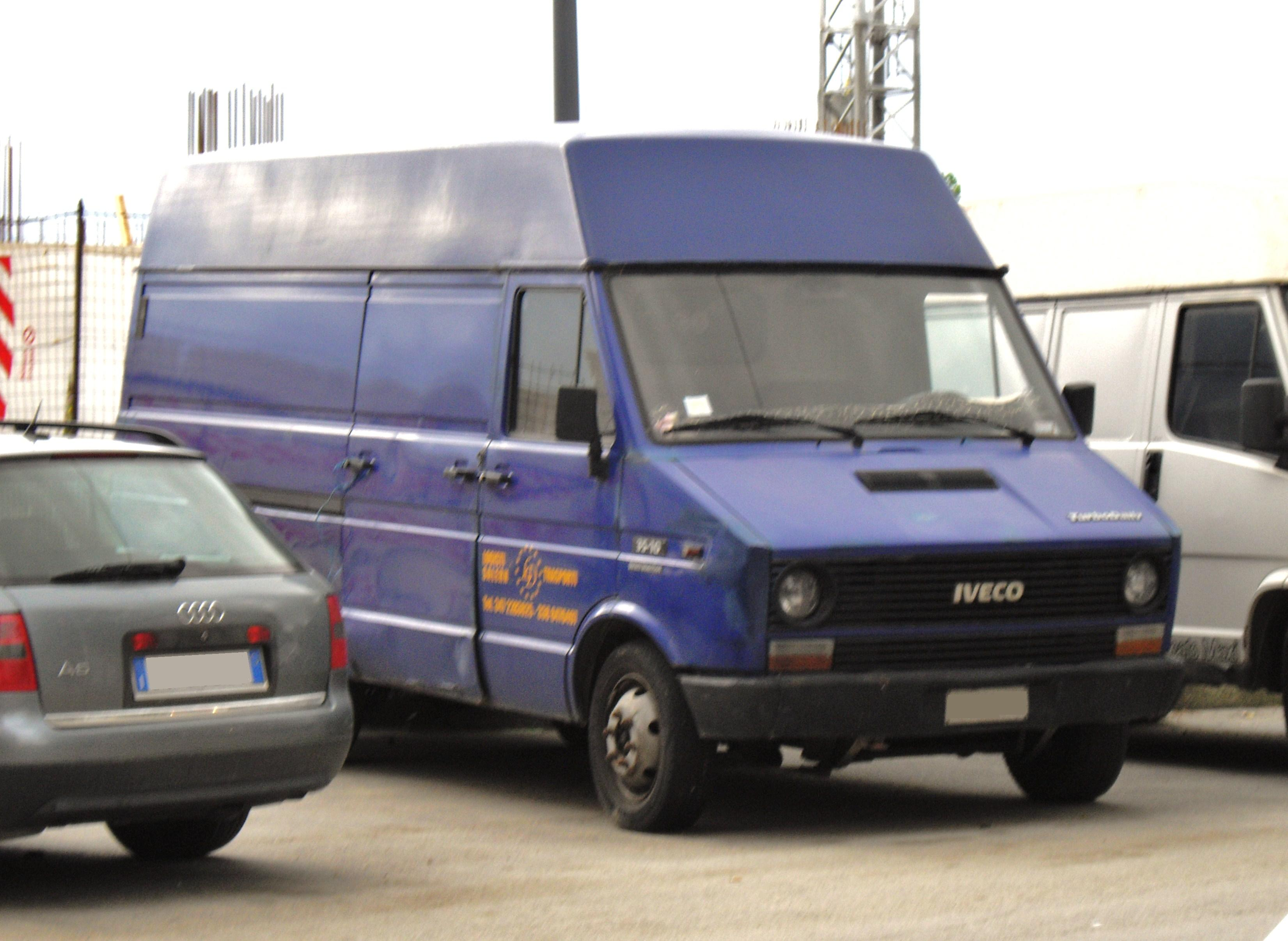

Overview
- Also called: Alfa Romeo AR8; Iveco-Ford Daily; Fiat Daily; OM Grinta; Zastava Rival; Iveco-Pegaso Daily; Iveco Duty; Pegaso Duty
- Production: 1978–1999; 1991–present (China)
- Assembly: Italy: Suzzara, Province of Mantua (Iveco SpA, Suzzara Plant); Spain (after 1991): Valladolid (Iveco España, SL, Valladolid Plant); China (after 1991): Nanjing (Nanjing Iveco Automobile Co Ltd); Australia (after 1992): Dandenong South; Serbia: Kragujevac; Libya: Tajura (CKD)
- Designer: Luan Hasnay

Body and chassis
- Body style: 4 door van 2-door chassis 4-door minibus
- Layout: Front-engine, rear-wheel-drive Front-engine, four-wheel-drive

Powertrain
- Engine: Diesel: 2.5 L I4; 2.5 L turbo I4
- Transmission: 5-speed manual

Dimensions
- Length: 6,150 mm (242.1 in)
- Width: 2,000 mm (78.7 in)
- Height: 2,770 mm (109.1 in)
- Curb weight: 3,500–5,000 kg (7,716–11,023 lb)

Chronology
- Predecessor: Ford A series (Iveco-Ford Daily)

In 1985, Iveco presented the turbodiesel version, called TurboDaily. To cover demand under 3.5 tonnes, reserved for the commercial vehicle division, Fiat Professional also launched the Fiat Ducato.

==== Engines ====
- 2.5 L diesel 72 hp (54 kW) at 4200 rpm, 141 N⋅m (104 lb⋅ft) at 2400 rpm
- 2.5 L turbodiesel 95 hp (71 kW) at 4100 rpm, 217 N⋅m (160 lb⋅ft) at 2300 rpm
- 2.5 L diesel I.D. 75 hp (56 kW) at 4200 rpm, 160 N⋅m (118 lb⋅ft) at 2200 rpm (only in Zastava Rival)

=== Facelifts ===
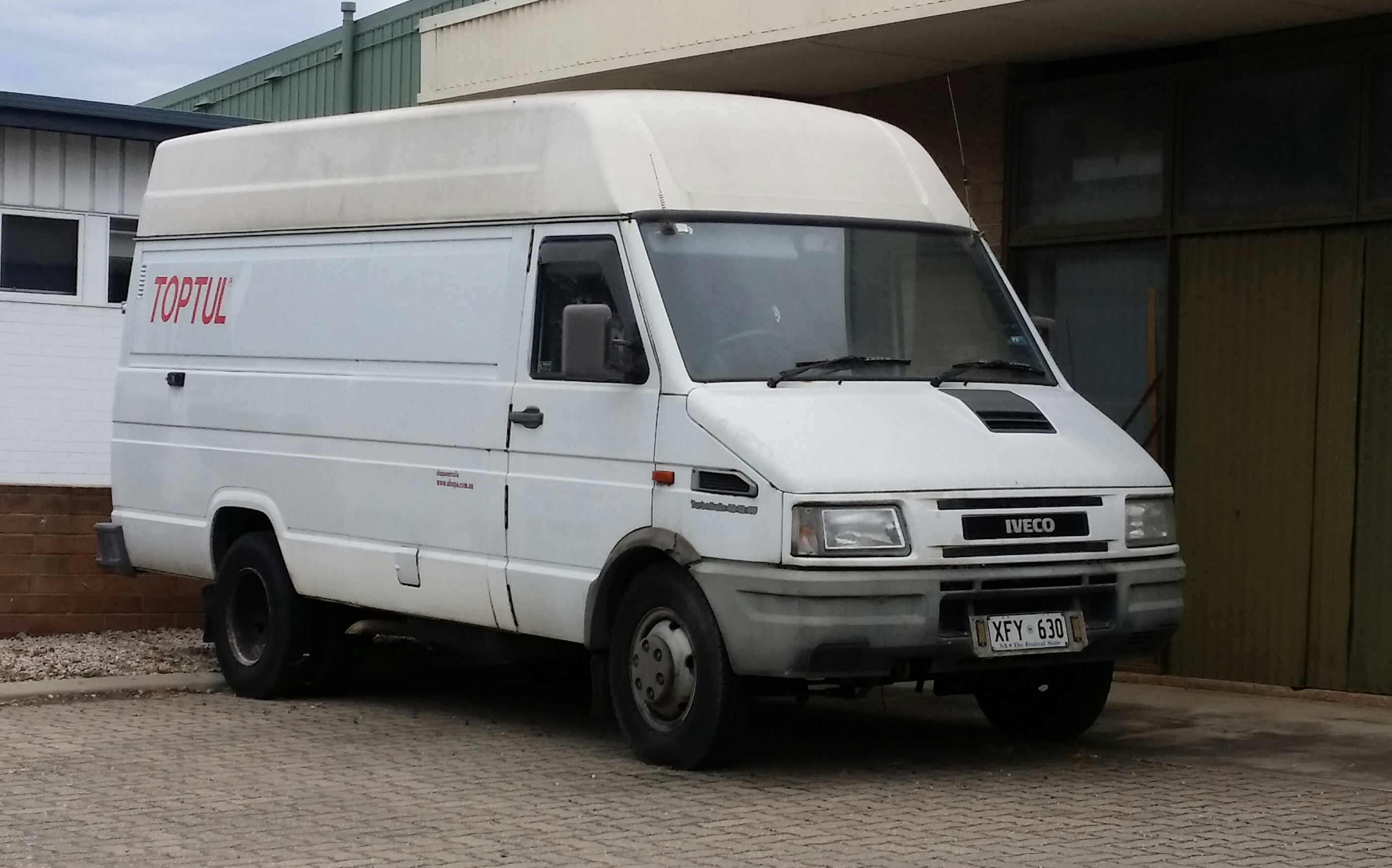
Iveco TurboDaily (front)

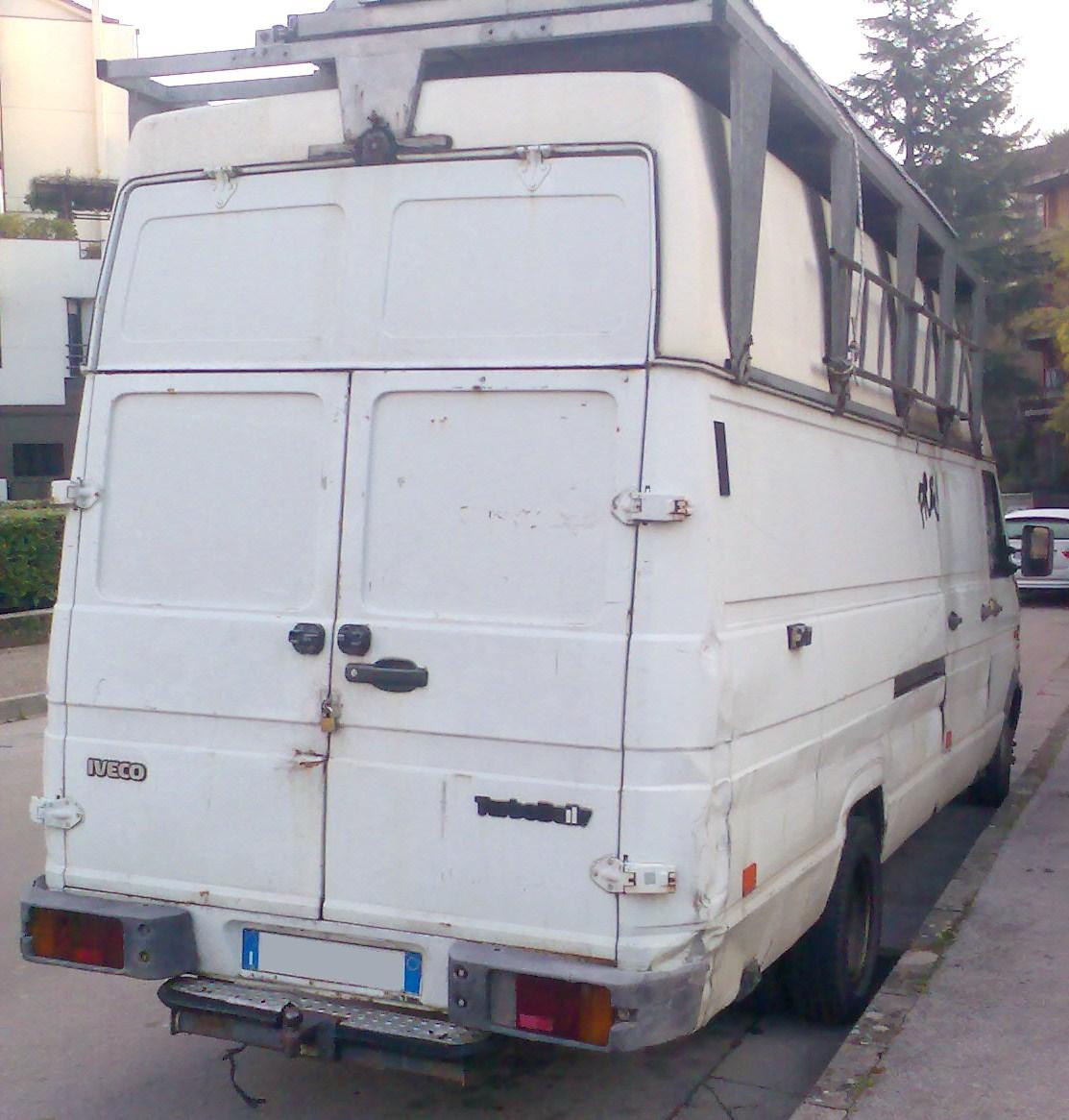
Iveco TurboDaily (rear)

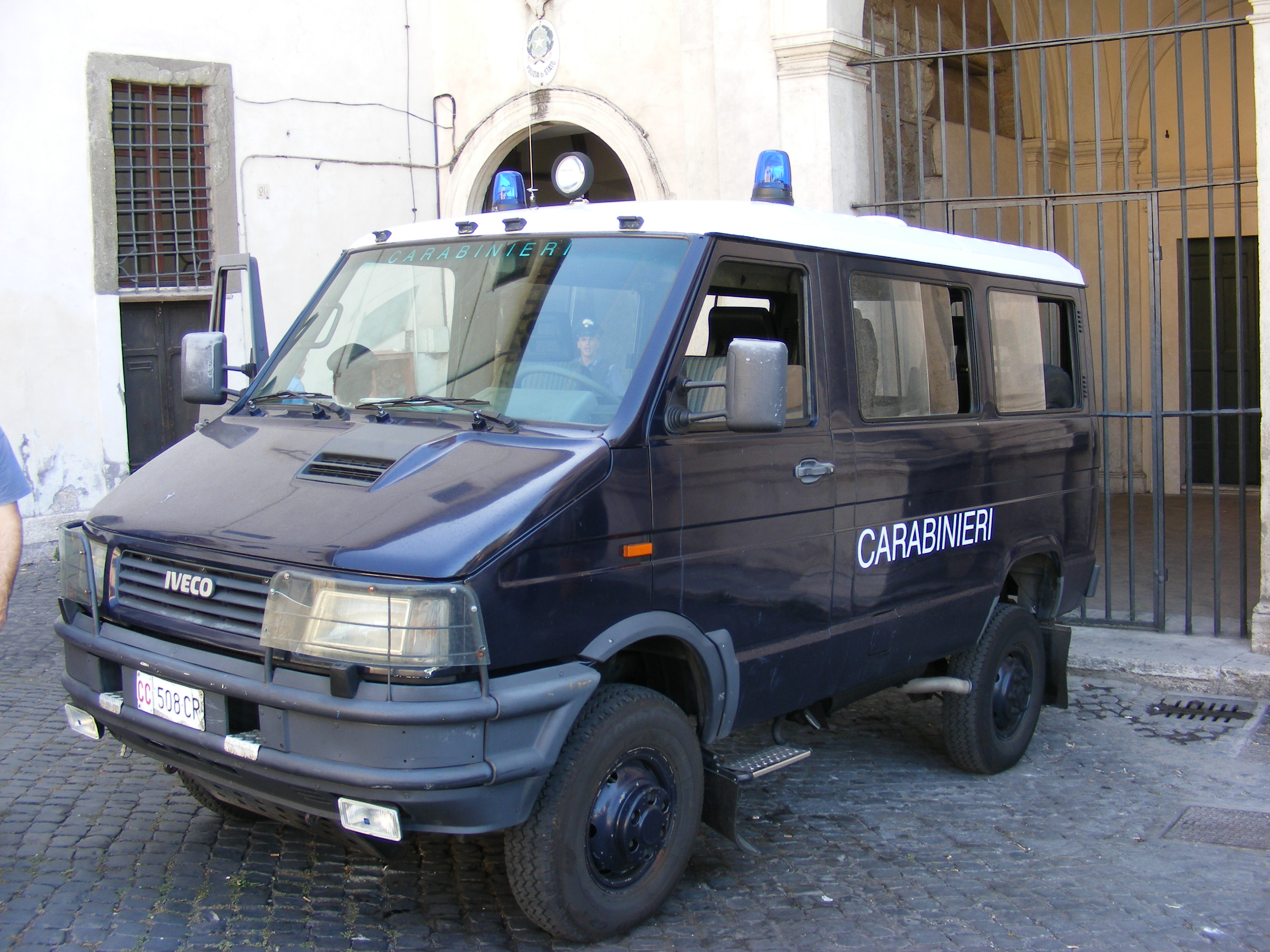
Carabinieri Iveco Daily VM-90 4x4

The facelift of the first generation Daily was introduced in 1990, with a totally revised cab and improvements on the Sofim engine (at that time, with a 2.5 L capacity). Following the entry of Ford's commercial operation into Iveco, in 1986, The Daily 3.5 ton was soon removed from the UK market as it was now direct competition with Ford's Transit, the Daily stayed on in the UK at rated above 4.0 ton, and now sold as the Iveco-Ford Daily. The Daily has no other connection with the Transit. Functionally, the Daily bridged the gap between the Transit and Cargo ranges. Turbodiesel versions are called "TurboDaily."

The first generation was again facelifted in 1996; it differs only slightly exterior-wise, but the engine was now available in 2.8-litre capacity 76 kW (102 hp). The 59-12 (chassis cabs and panel vans) and 59-13 (minibus) models were launched (GVW 6.4 tons). All-wheel-drive variants were also made available.

==== Engines ====
- 2.5 L diesel 75 hp (56 kW) at 4,200 rpm
- 2.5 L turbodiesel 103 hp (77 kW) at 3,800 rpm
- 2.5 L tdi 116 hp (87 kW) at 3,800 rpm
- 2.8 L diesel 85 hp (63 kW)
- 2.8 L turbodiesel 103 hp (77 kW) at 3,600 rpm
- 2.8 L tdi 122 hp (91 kW) at 3,600 rpm

=== Chinese production ===
Since 1991, the Daily has been license built in China by Nanjing Automobile's subsidiary Naveco. The model was sold as the Deyi (得意), and later spawned modernized facelift variants called the Xindeyi (新得意, New Daily) in 2011 and 2017. A major facelift variant called Quanxindeyi (全新得意) was later introduced in 2023.

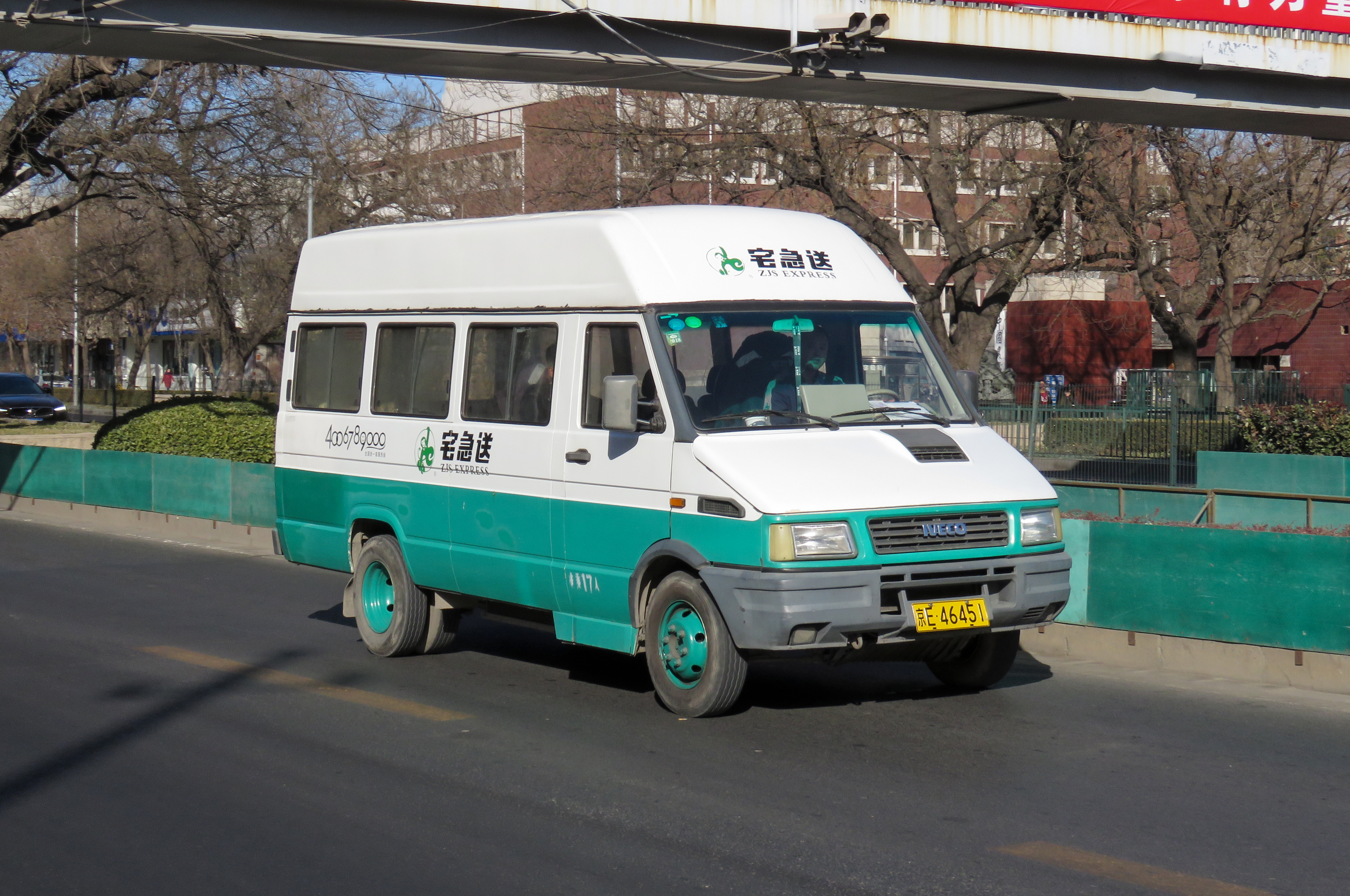
Naveco Deyi (Turbo Daily)

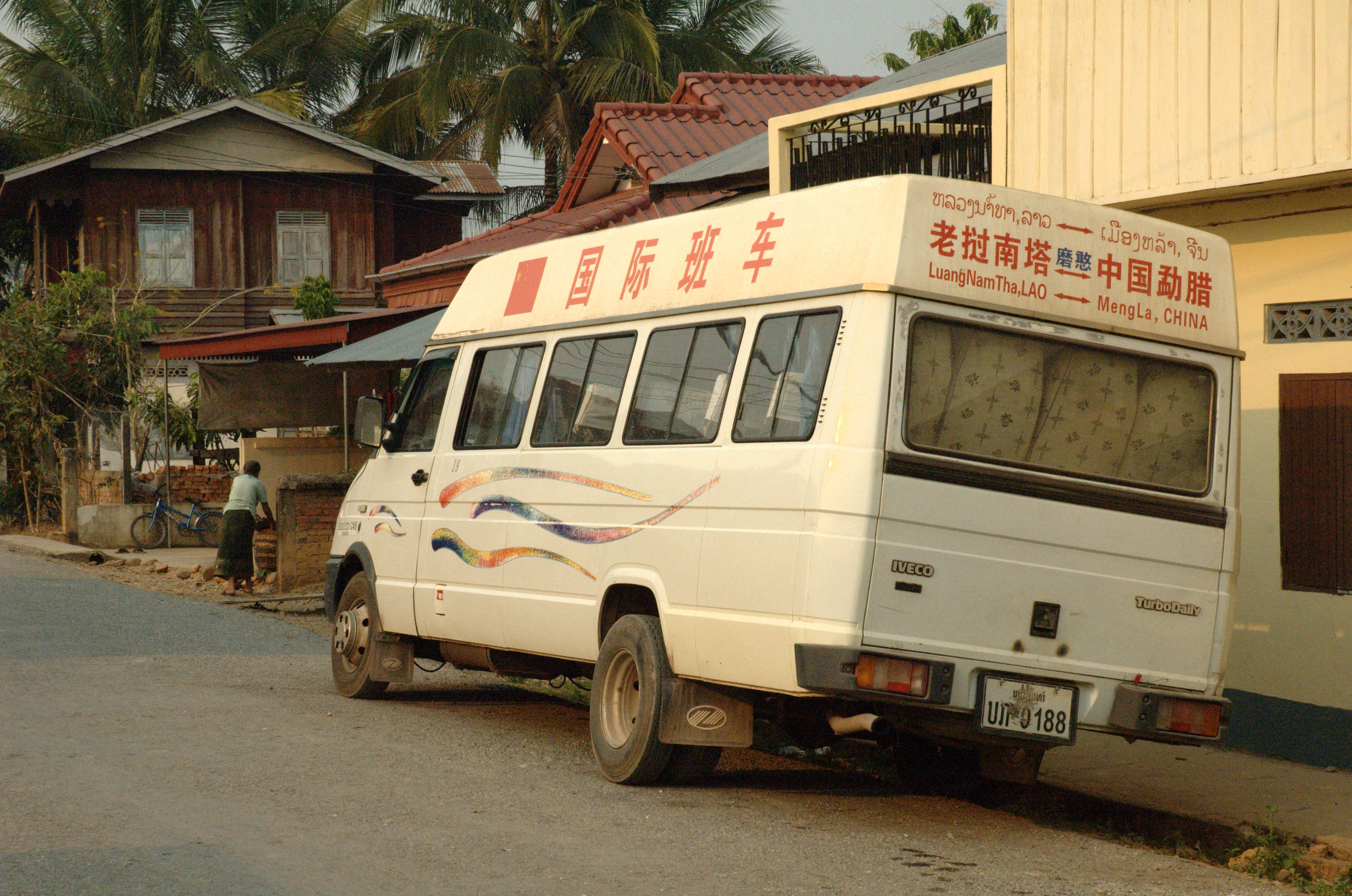
Naveco Deyi (Turbo Daily) (rear)

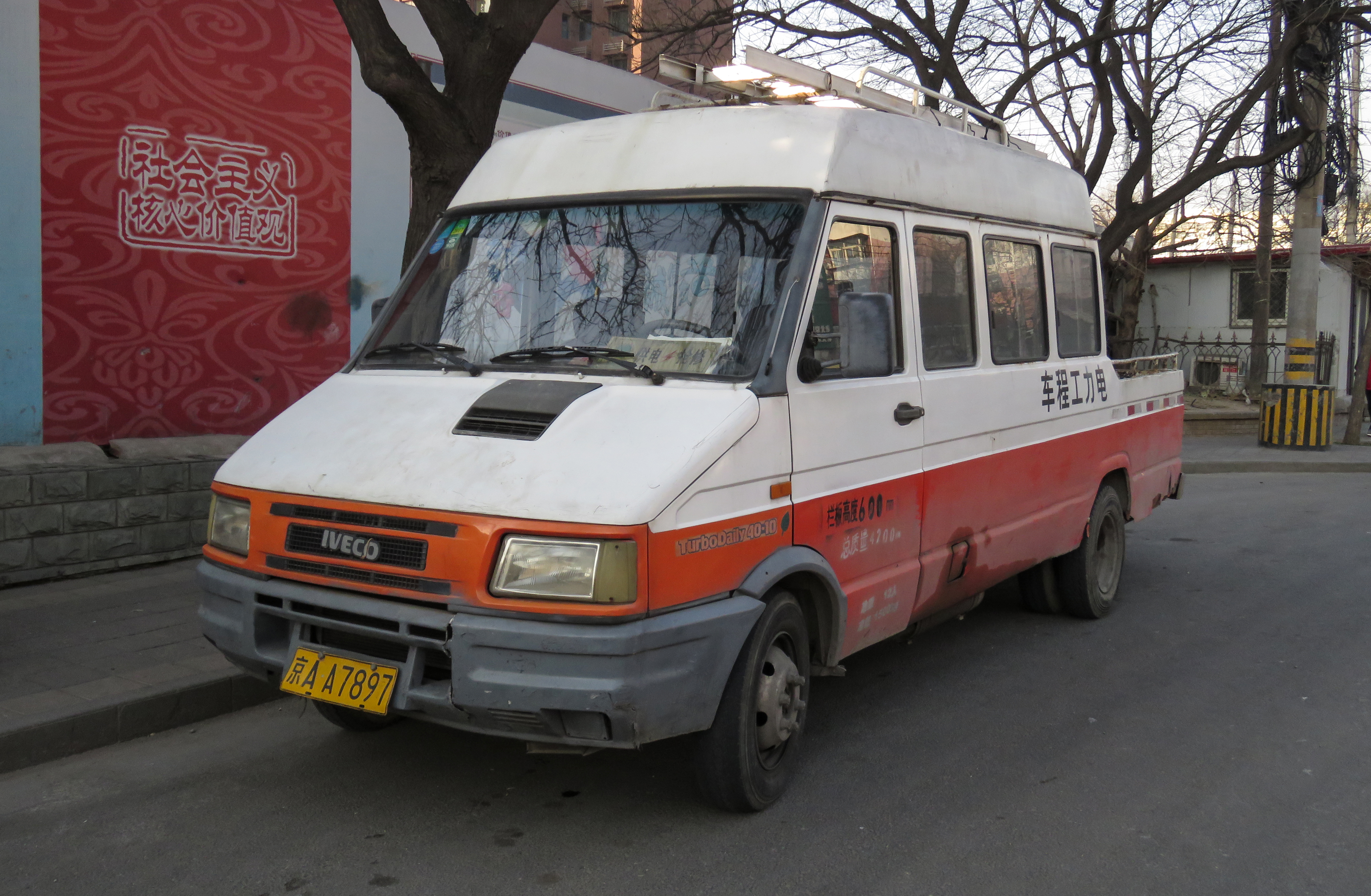
Crew cab

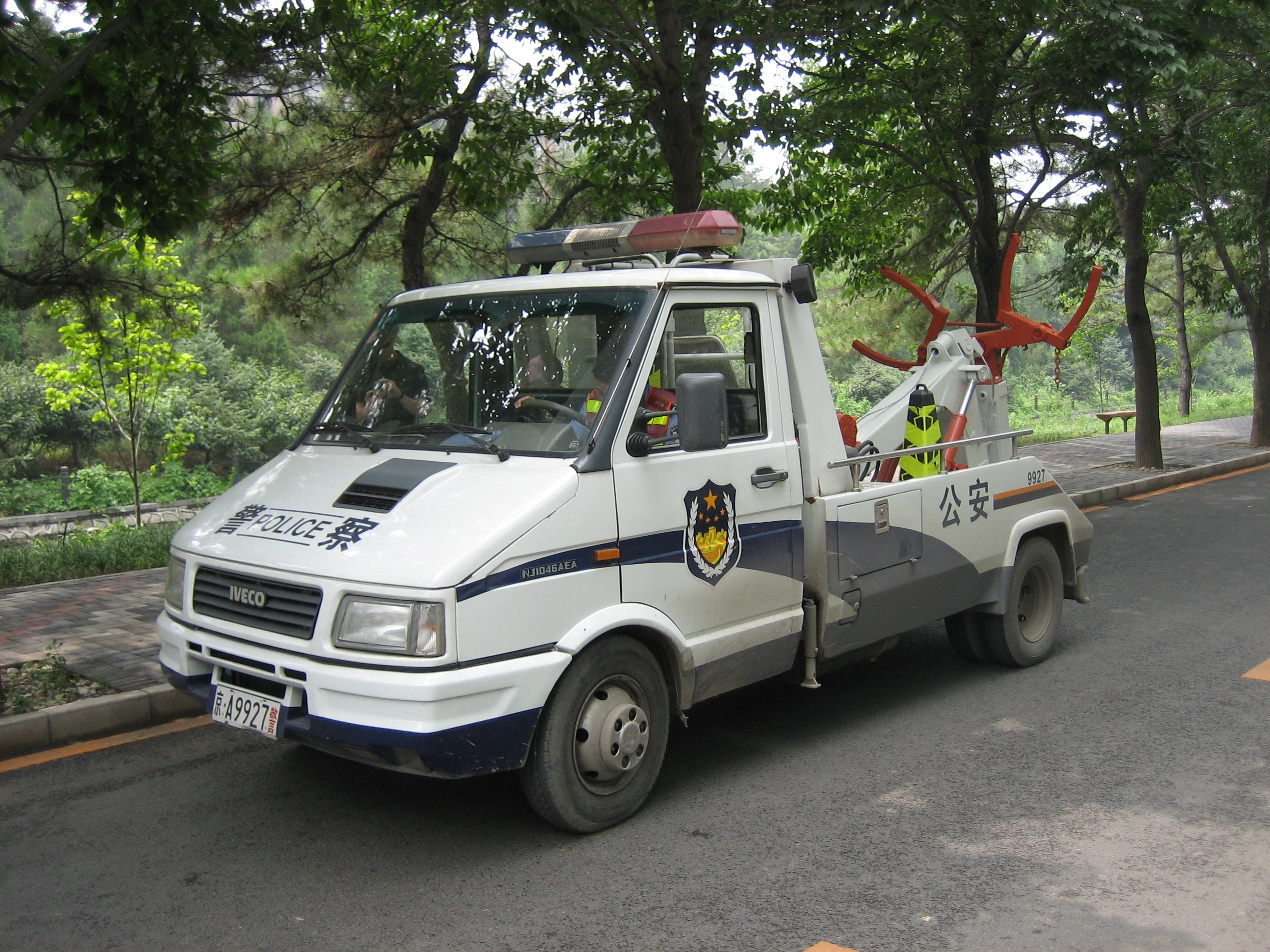
Tow truck

==== Facelift ====
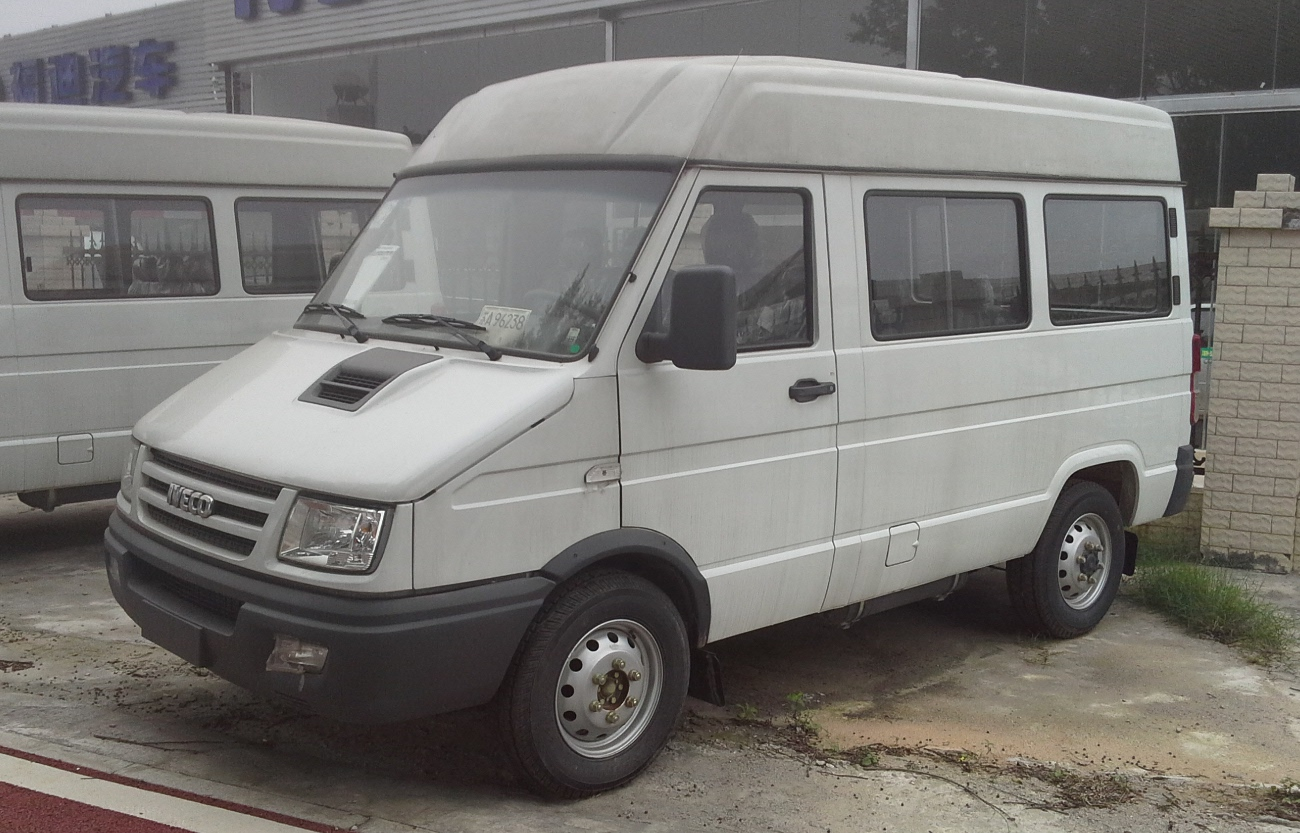
Naveco Xindeyi (first facelift, front)

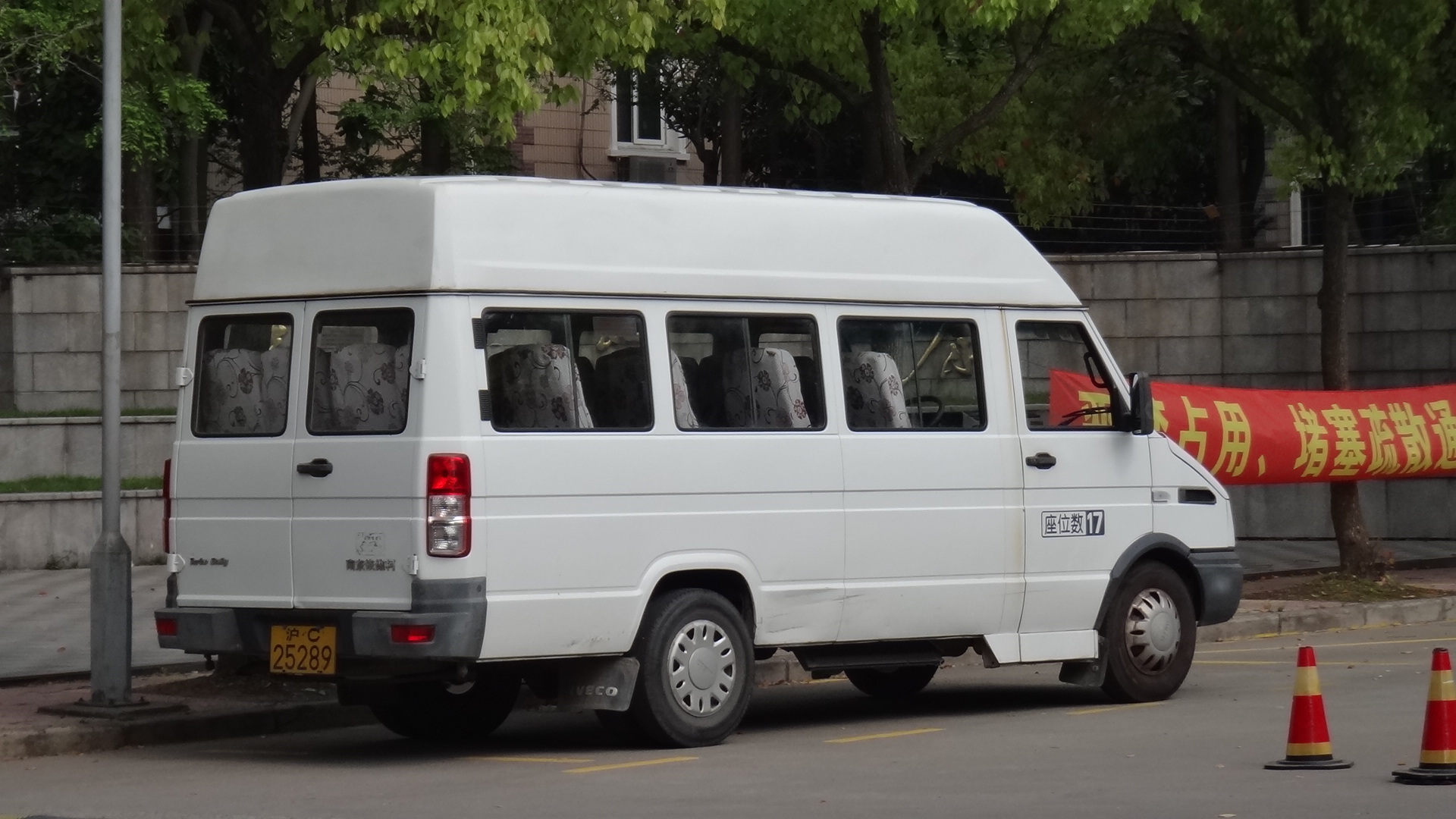
Naveco Xindeyi (first facelift, rear)

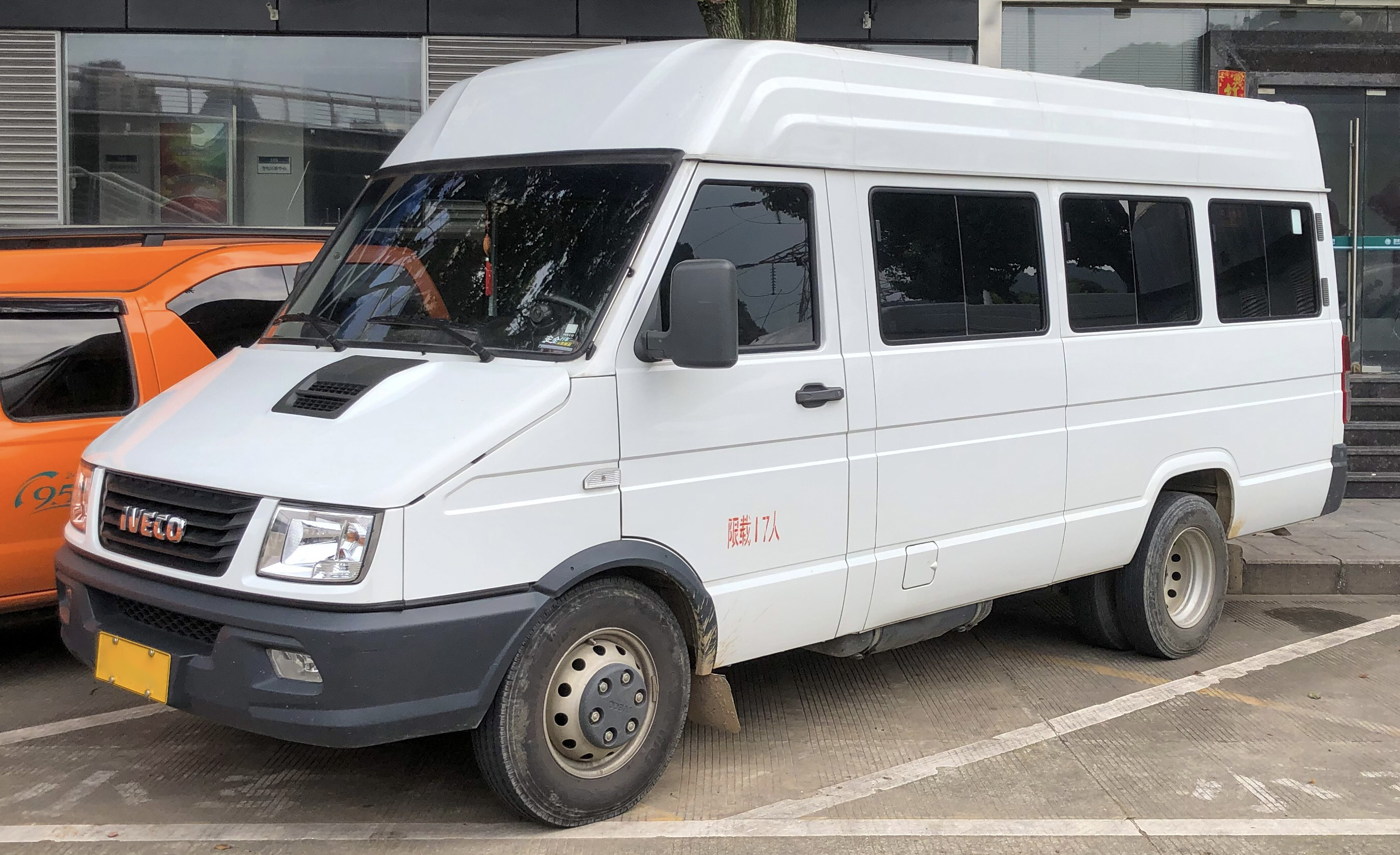
Naveco Xindeyi (second facelift, front)

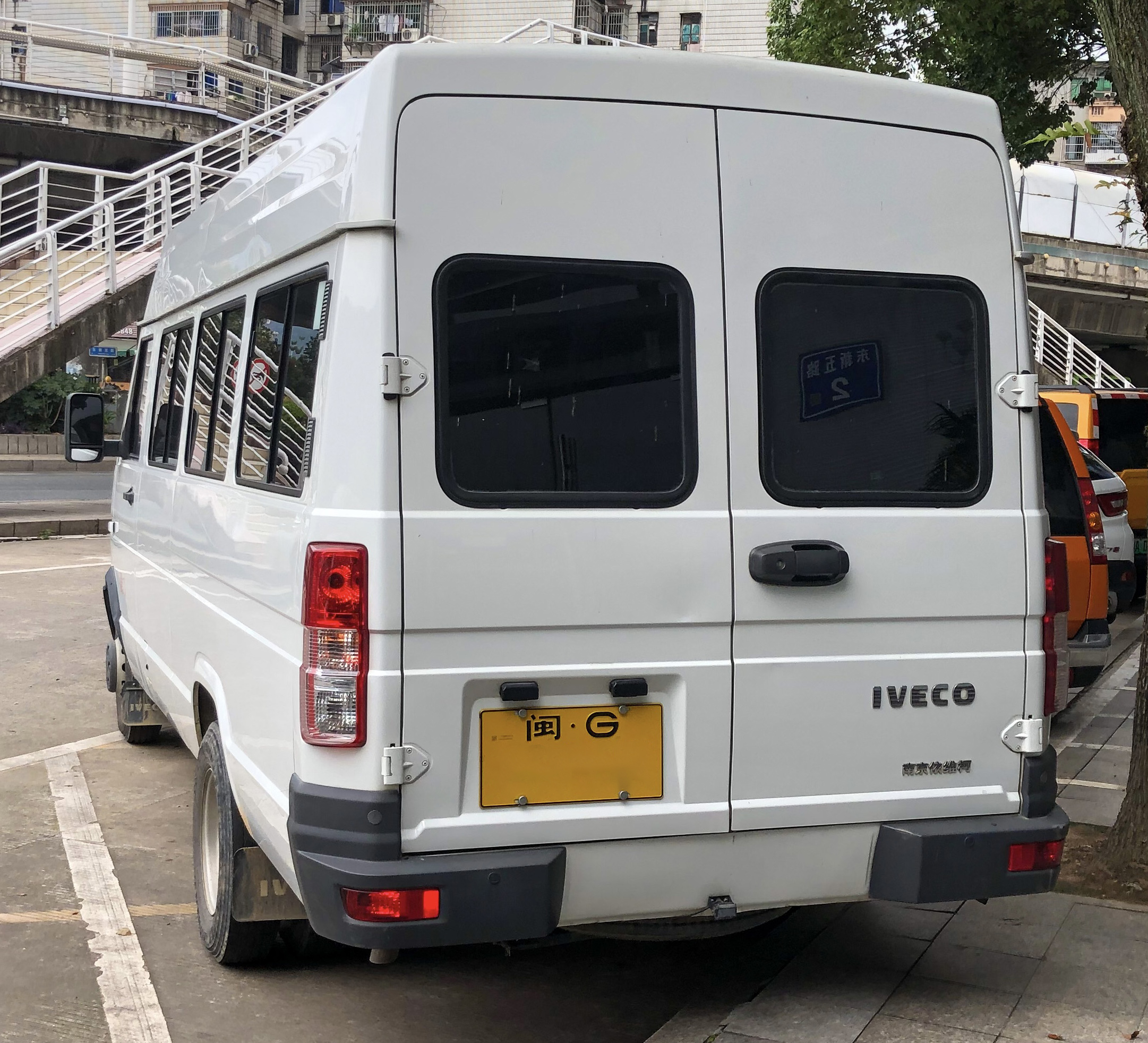
Naveco Xindeyi (second facelift, rear)

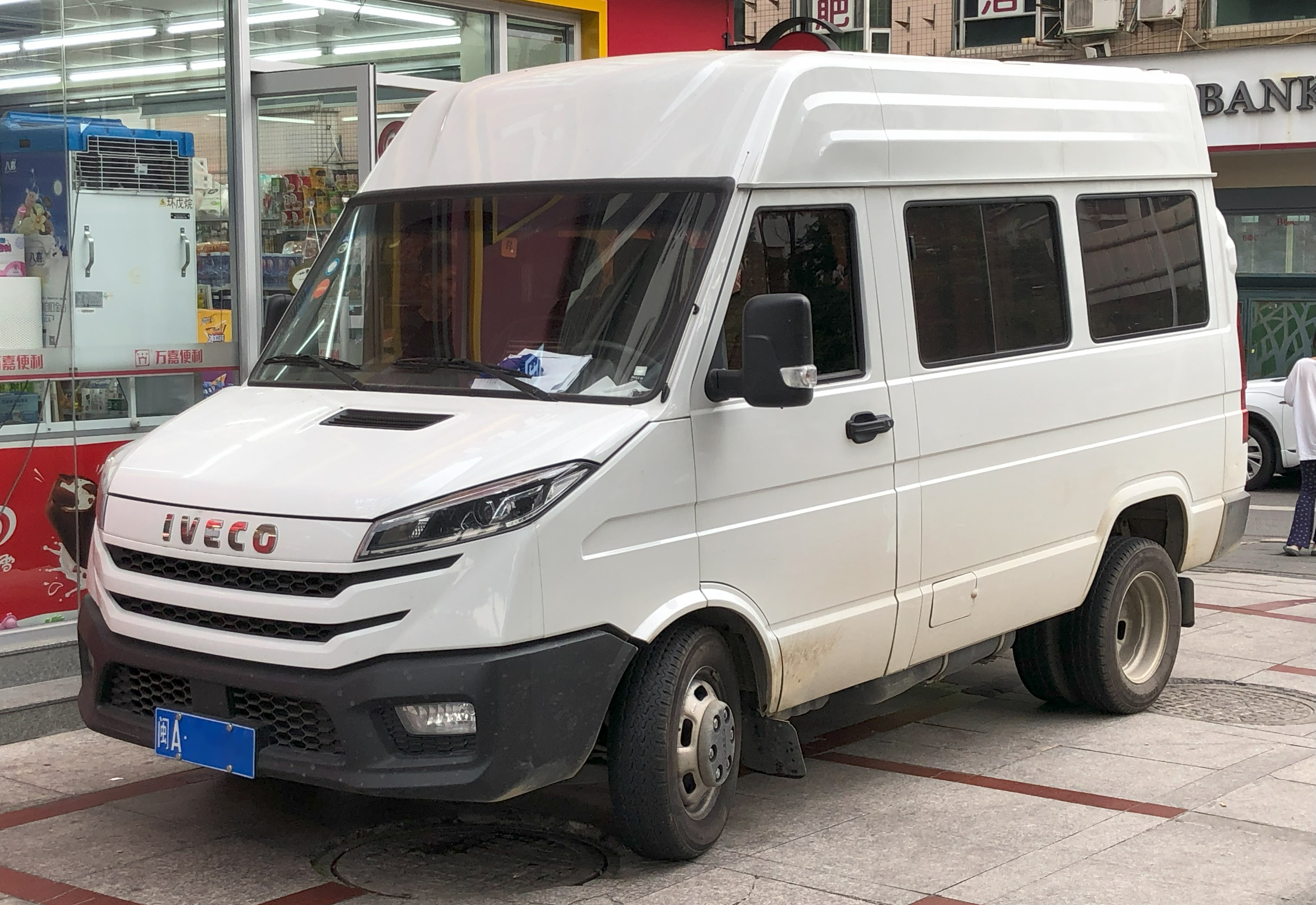
Naveco Quanxindeyi (third facelift, front)

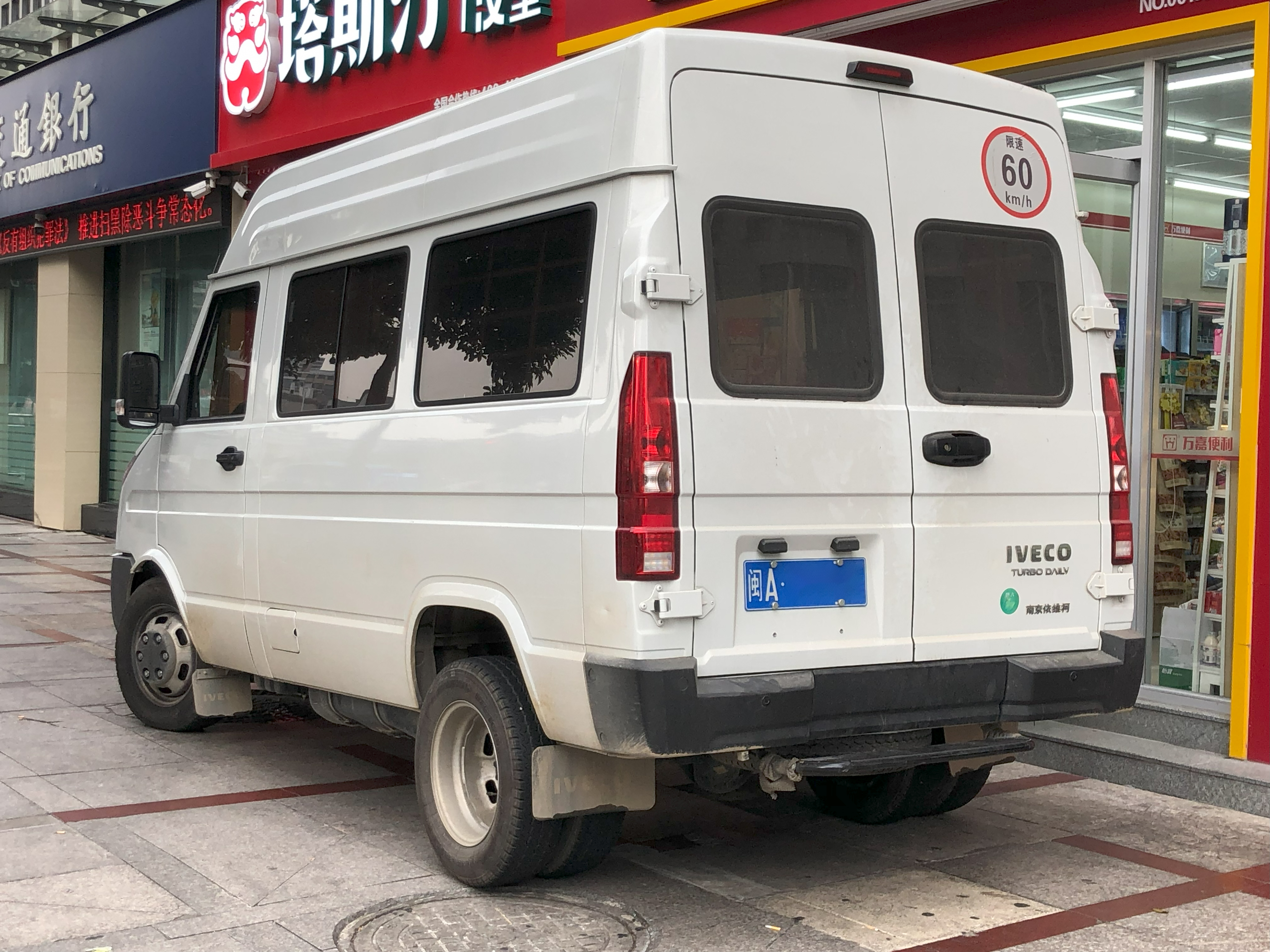
Naveco Quanxindeyi (third facelift, rear)

== Second generation (1999) ==
Second generation
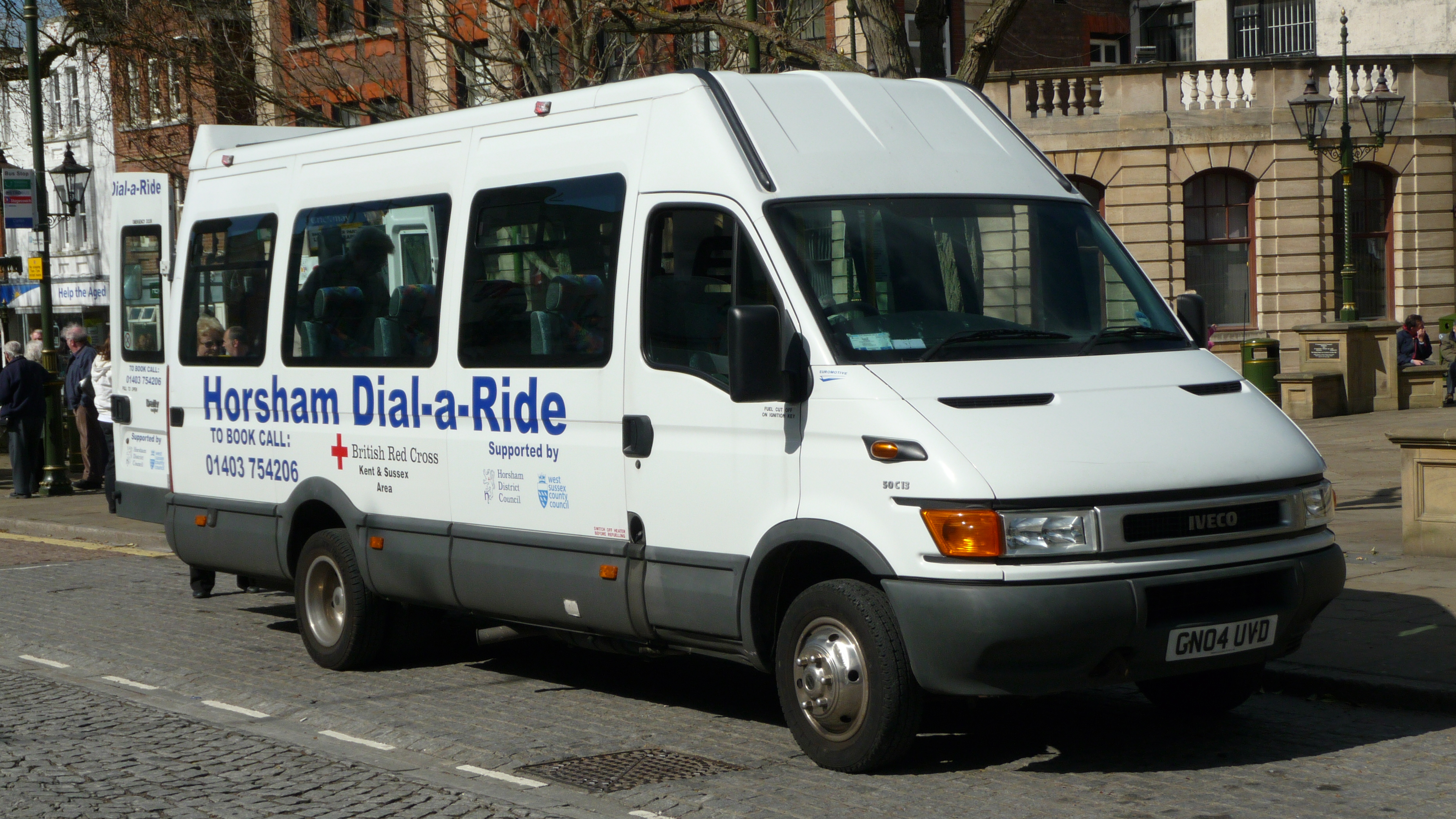
- Second generation Daily as a minibus

Overview
- Manufacturer: Iveco
- Also called: Irisbus Daily; Irisbus EcoDaily (2009–11); Iveco Turin (China, 2004–2008); Iveco Power Daily (China, 2009–2021); Iveco Daily Ousheng (China, since 2017); Maxus H90 (Second facelift RV, China)
- Production: 1999–2014; 2004–2021 (China, Turin/Power Daily); 2017–present (China, Daily Ousheng)
- Assembly: Italy: Suzzara, Province of Mantua (Iveco SpA, Suzzara Plant); China: Nanjing (Nanjing Iveco Automobile Co Ltd); Spain: Valladolid (Iveco España, SL, Valladolid Plant); Australia Dandenong South; Serbia: Kragujevac; Libya: Tajura (CKD); Brazil: Sete Lagoas; Russia: Nizhny Novgorod (GAZ); Vietnam: Quảng Nam (THACO)

Body and chassis
- Class: Light commercial vehicle (M)
- Body style: Van; Minibus; Pickup truck

Powertrain
- Engine: 2.3 diesel 3.0 diesel
- Transmission: 5-speed manual 6-speed manual 6-speed semi-automatic

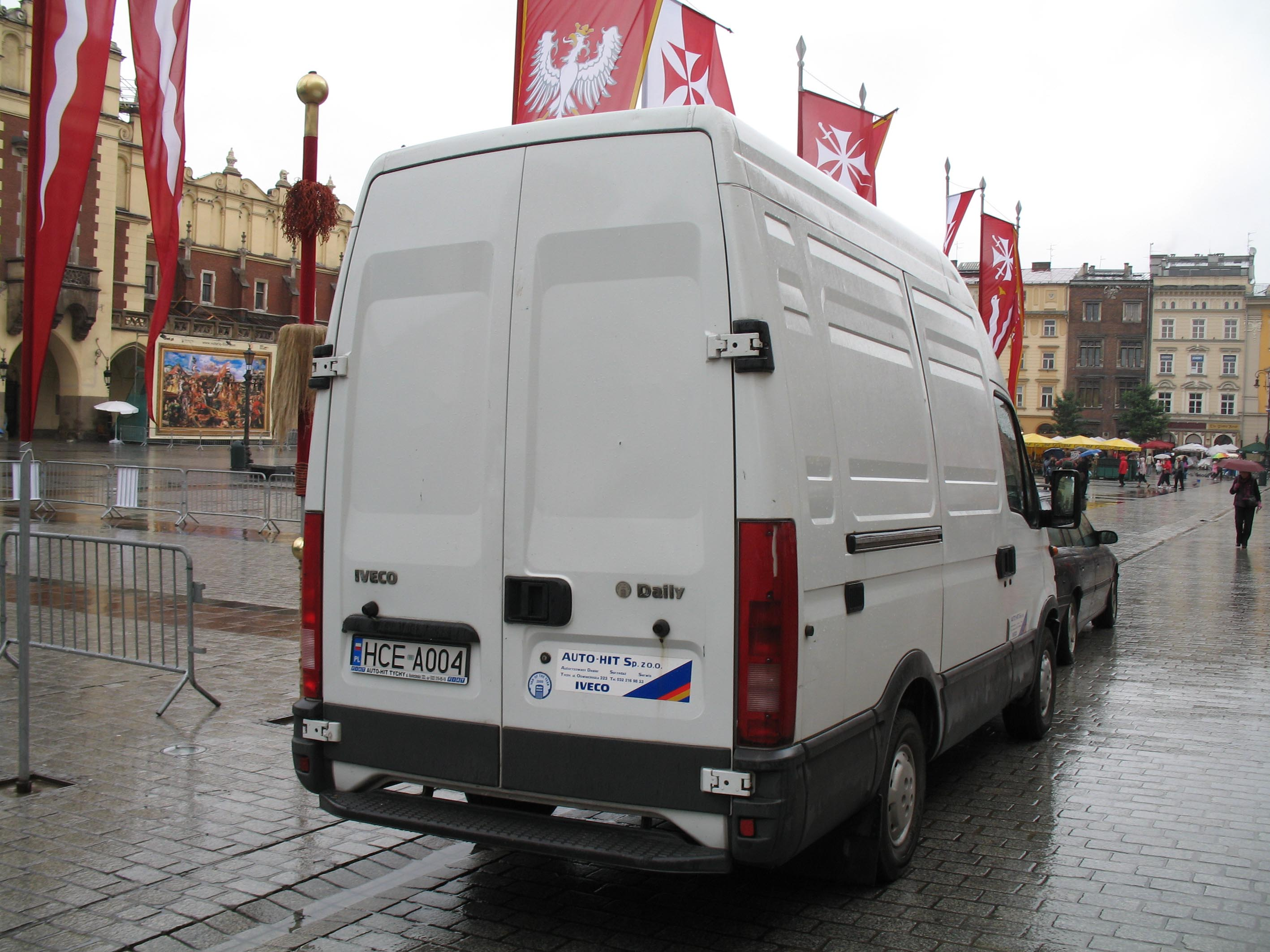
Iveco Daily (rear; pre-facelift)

With second series the Daily got new light groups (wider and lower). The Turbodaily name was dropped as all turbodiesels came with Unijet technology (common rail). Two new versions were released: "Agile", with automatic gearshift, and "CNG", a natural gas version. Also two new load classes were introduced: Daily 65 and Daily 28 (6.5 tons and 2.8 tons). The Iveco Daily was made "Van of the Year" for the year 2000.

The second generation of the Iveco Daily and the first generation of the Renault Mascott share many panels and some components of the cab, including the doors due to an agreement between Iveco and Renault stipulated in July 1994. The agreement provided for the production and sharing of common components for a total of 120 thousand pieces a year produced in the various factories of Brescia (Italy, Iveco), Suzzara (Italy, Iveco), Valladolid (Spain, Iveco) and Batilly (France, SoVAB Renault factory). The Daily continued to be sold as an Iveco-Ford in the United Kingdom until 2006 when Ford dropped out of the medium/heavy duty commercial van market with no successor.

In 2010, Iveco celebrated the sale of 2,000,000 Daily units worldwide.

=== Engines ===
Originally there were models with three engine options, all of type 8140 of 2.8 liters. A variant was a suction diesel with 66 kW (89 hp), but they rarely sold. Another had turbocharger, intercooler and 78 kW (105 hp). The last variant gave 92 kW (123 hp) and had common rail injection. Shortly after receiving the largest engine variable geometry turbocharger and an output of 107 kW (143 hp).

In 2003 came the F1A engine with 2.3-litre stroke volume and second-generation common rail injection with 74 kW (99 hp) and 88 kW (118 hp), and in 2004 came the new F1C engine of 3.0 liters, based on F1A with timing chain and 100 kW (134 hp) or 122 kW (164 hp). At this time, the old 8140-engine was completely replaced.

=== Transmissions ===
The motors up to 88 kW (118 hp) had five-speed gearbox, while the more powerful engines also available with a six-speed gearbox. The model could also be obtained with electronic / hydraulic controlled manual gearbox, called Agile.

=== First facelift ===
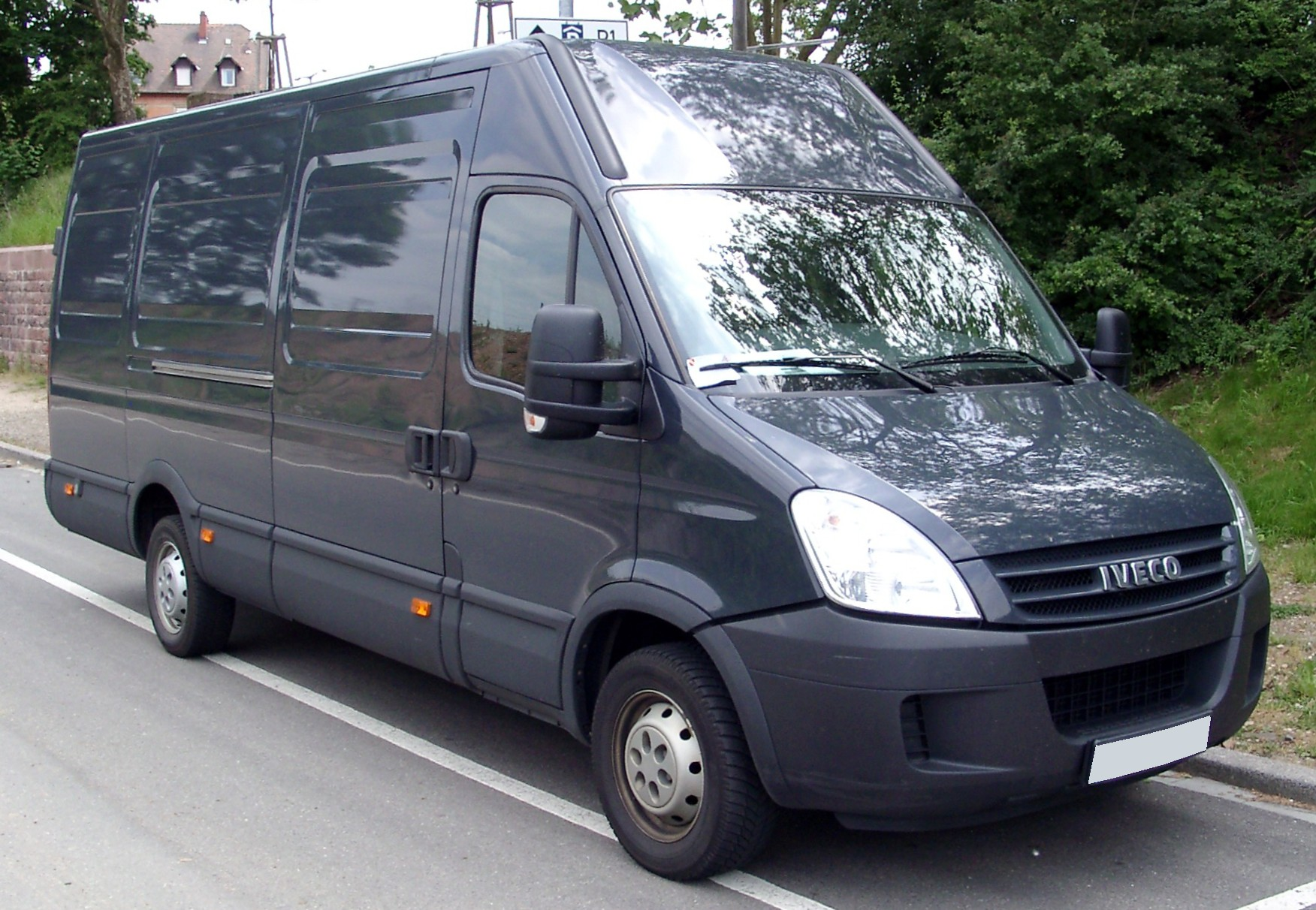
Iveco Daily (front)

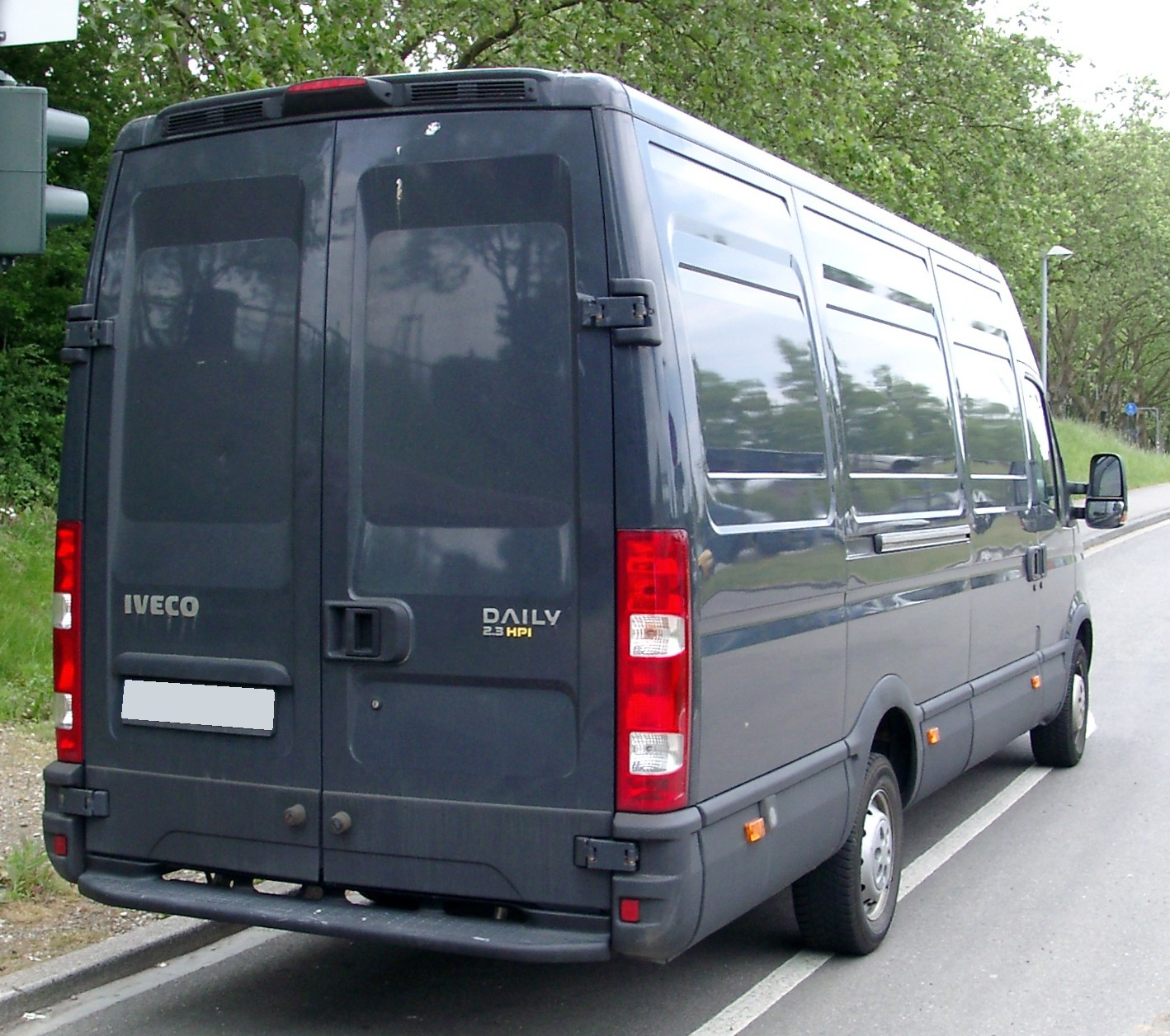
Iveco Daily (rear)

The 1º facelift of the second generation was designed by Giugiaro and arrived to markets in the middle of 2006. It is available as: Van, cabin cruiser, Combi, Minibus, Agile, and CNG. The minibus is also commercialized with the Irisbus brand. Certain models with clean engines have been sold as the "Iveco EcoDaily" in some European markets.

For the first time since the year 2000, an all-wheel-drive version of the Daily is available starting from 2007. This is developed in co-operation with the company SCAM and is available as single cab and double cab with the wheelbases 3,050 mm (120 in) and 3,400 mm (130 in) and double cab with wheelbase of 3,400 mm (130 in). Permissible total weight in two versions: 3,500 kg (7,700 lb) or 5,500 kg (12,100 lb).

=== Electric version ===
A version powered by a 30 kW (40 HP) electric motor (60 kW peak) supplied by a battery with a capacity of 76 Ah and 21.2 kWh was announced in August 2010.

==== Engines ====
- 2.3 HPI 96 PS (71 kW; 95 hp) and 116 PS (85 kW; 114 hp)
- 2.3 HPT 90 PS (66 kW; 89 hp) diesel
- 3.0 HPI 146 PS (107 kW; 144 hp)
- 3.0 HPT 176 PS (129 kW; 174 hp)
- 3.0 CNG 136 metric horsepower (100 kW)

=== Second facelift ===
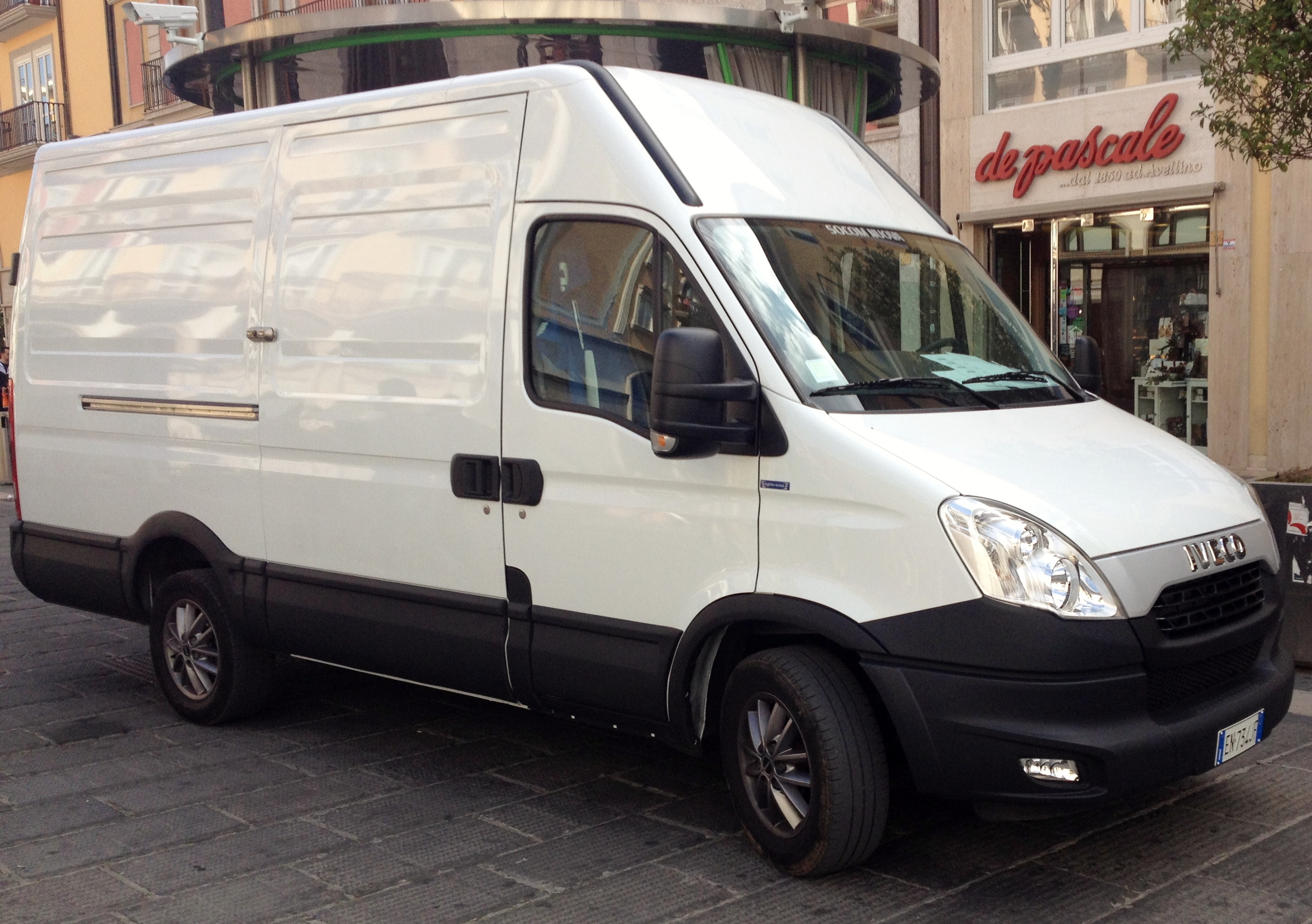
Iveco Daily (front)

The second facelift of the second generation was introduced 29 June 2011 and came into the market at the beginning of September 2011.

==== Engines ====
Euro 5

- 2.3 L 78 kW (106 PS)/270 Nm
- 2.3 L 93 kW (126 PS)/320 Nm
- 2.3 L 107 kW (145 PS)/350 Nm
- 3.0 L 107 kW (145 PS)/350 Nm
- 3.0 L 126 kW (171 PS)/400 Nm
- 3.0 L 150 kW (204 PS)/470 Nm

EEV

- 3.0 L 107 kW (145 PS)/370 Nm
- 3.0 L 126 kW (171 PS)/400 Nm
- 3.0 L CNG 100 kW (136 PS)/350 Nm

=== Chinese production ===
Since 2009, the third generation Daily has been the base of the Turin (都灵) and later the Power Daily (宝迪) variant by Nanjing Automobile's subsidiary Naveco. The model was sold until 2013 and received a modernized facelift variant sold starting from 2014 to 2017. An electric van variant of Power Daily was also available from 2018 and ended in 2021.

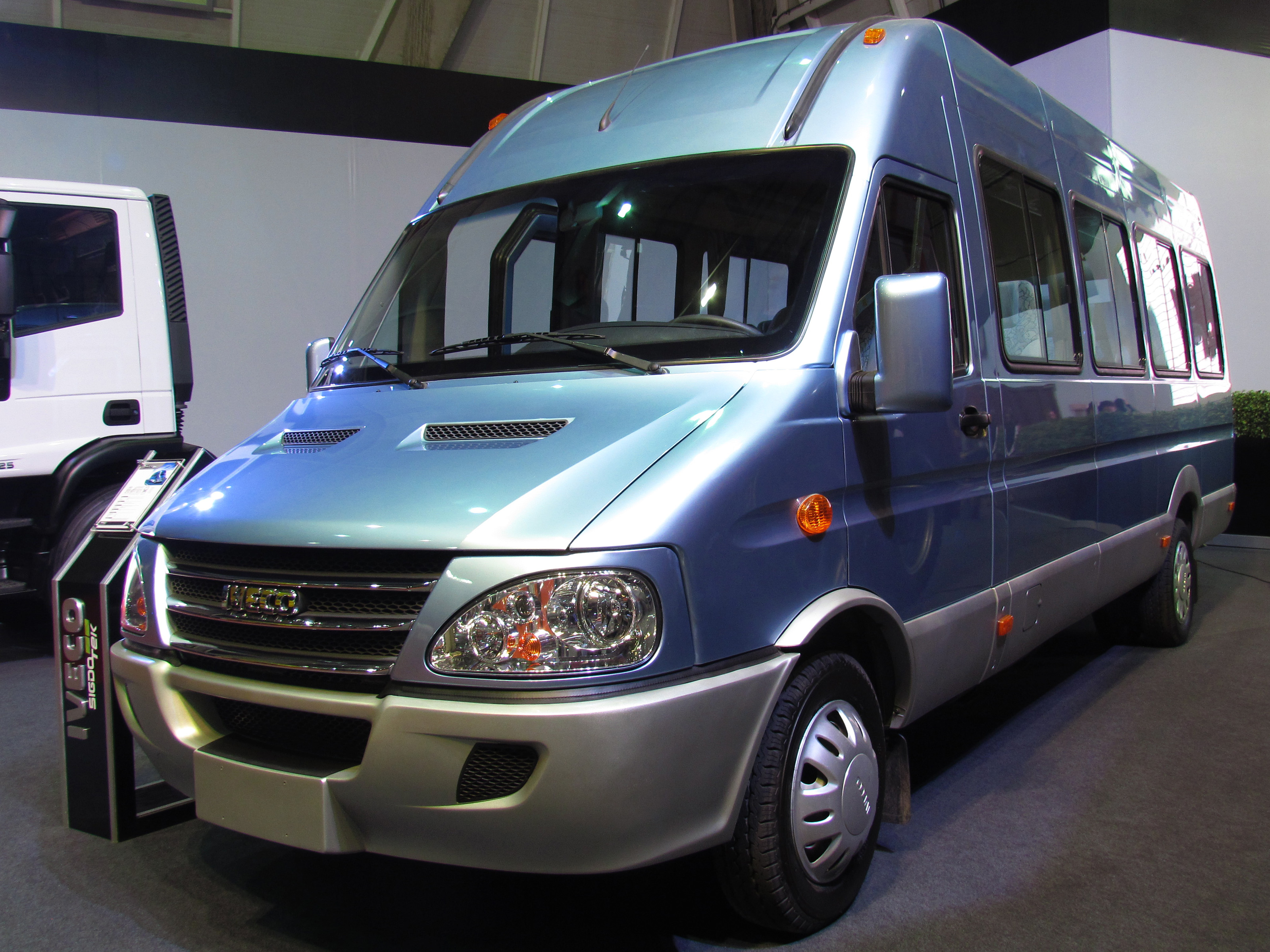
Naveco Power Daily

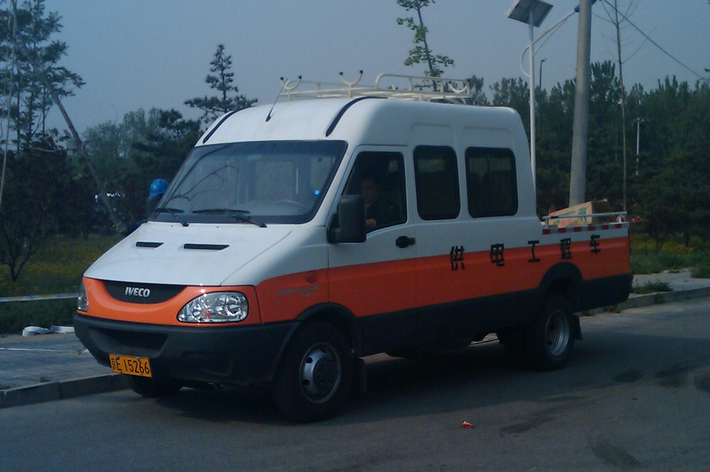
Naveco Power Daily crewcab

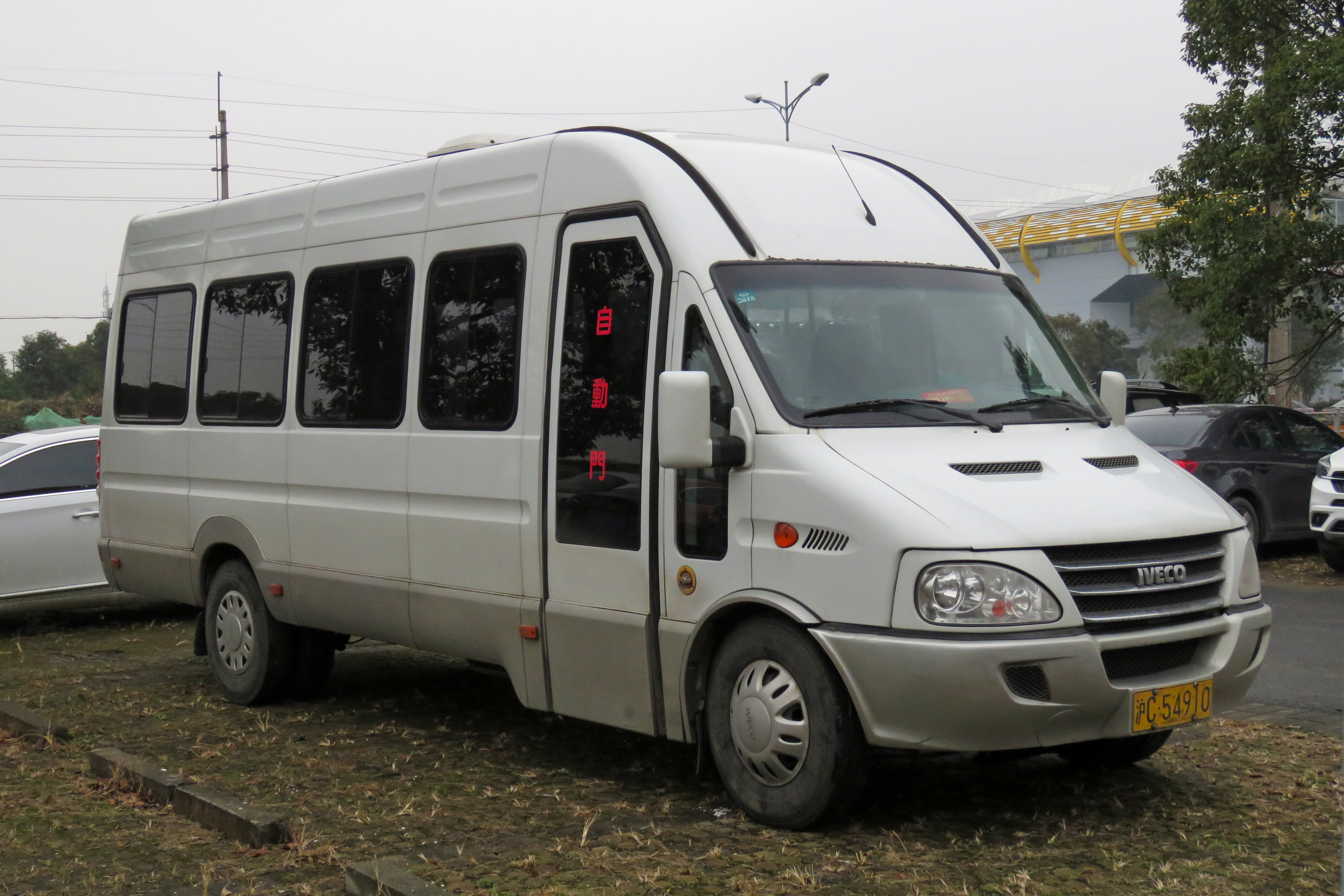
Naveco Power Daily A50 (shuttle bus)

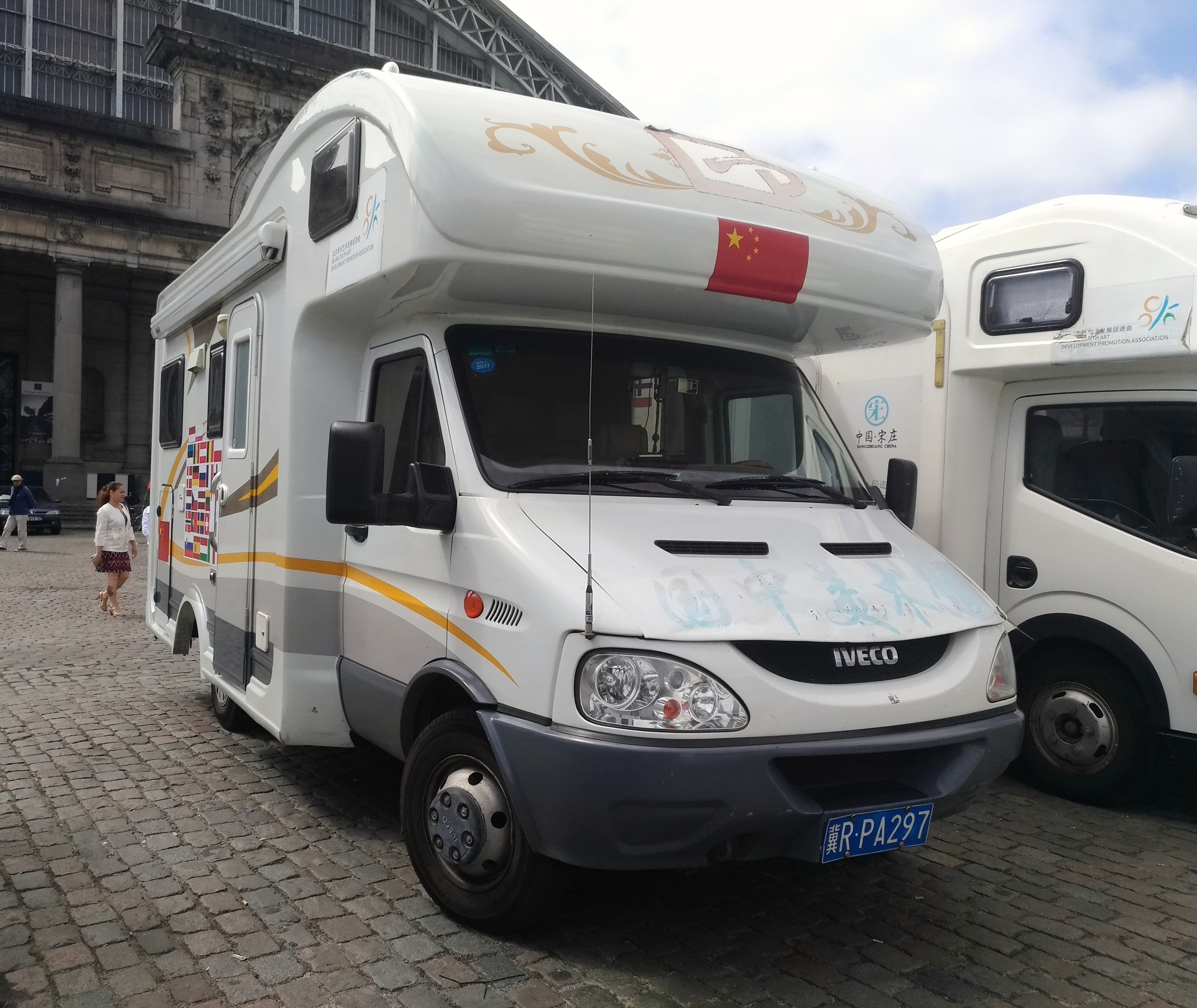
Naveco Power Daily RV

==== Facelift ====
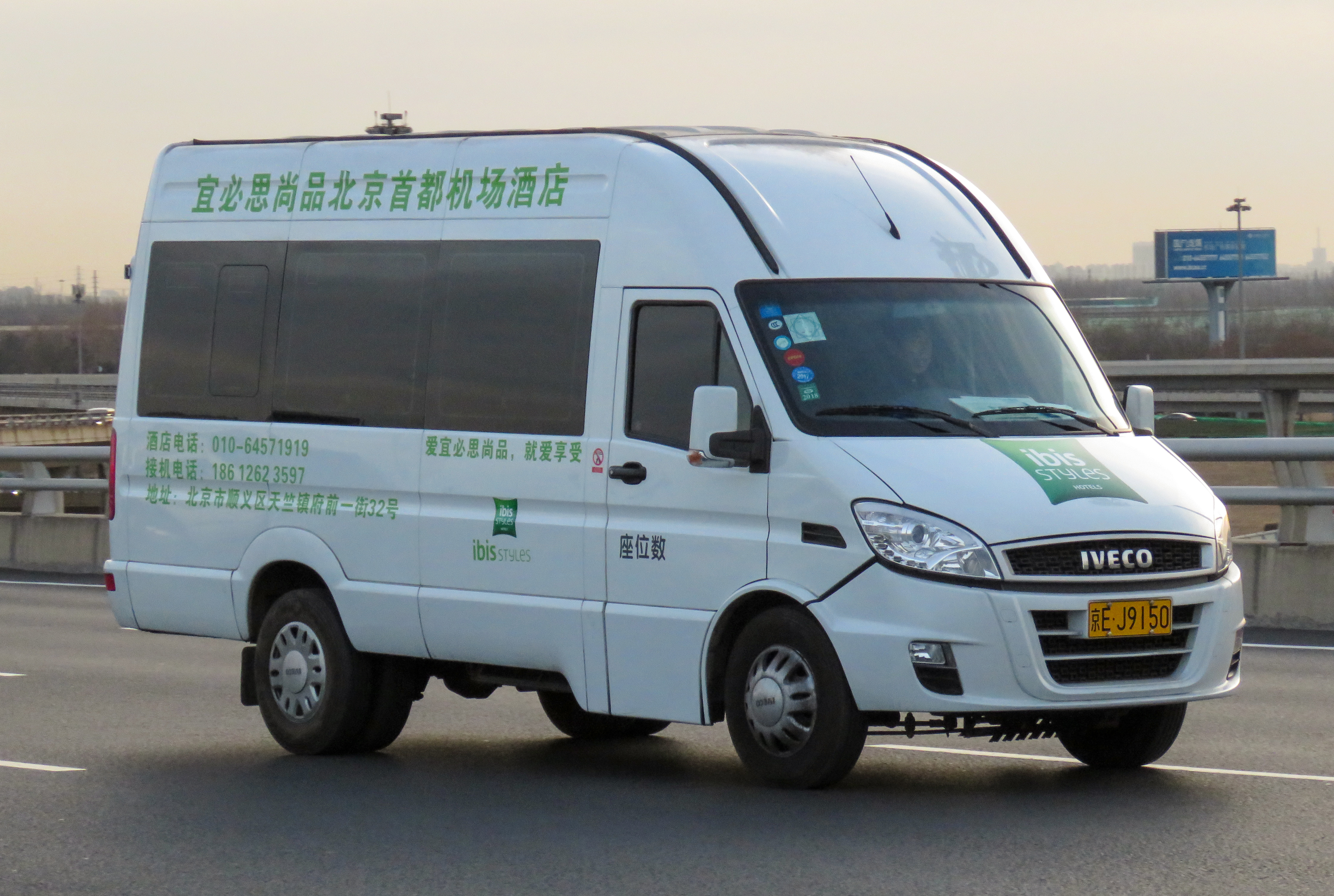
2014–2021 Naveco Power Daily

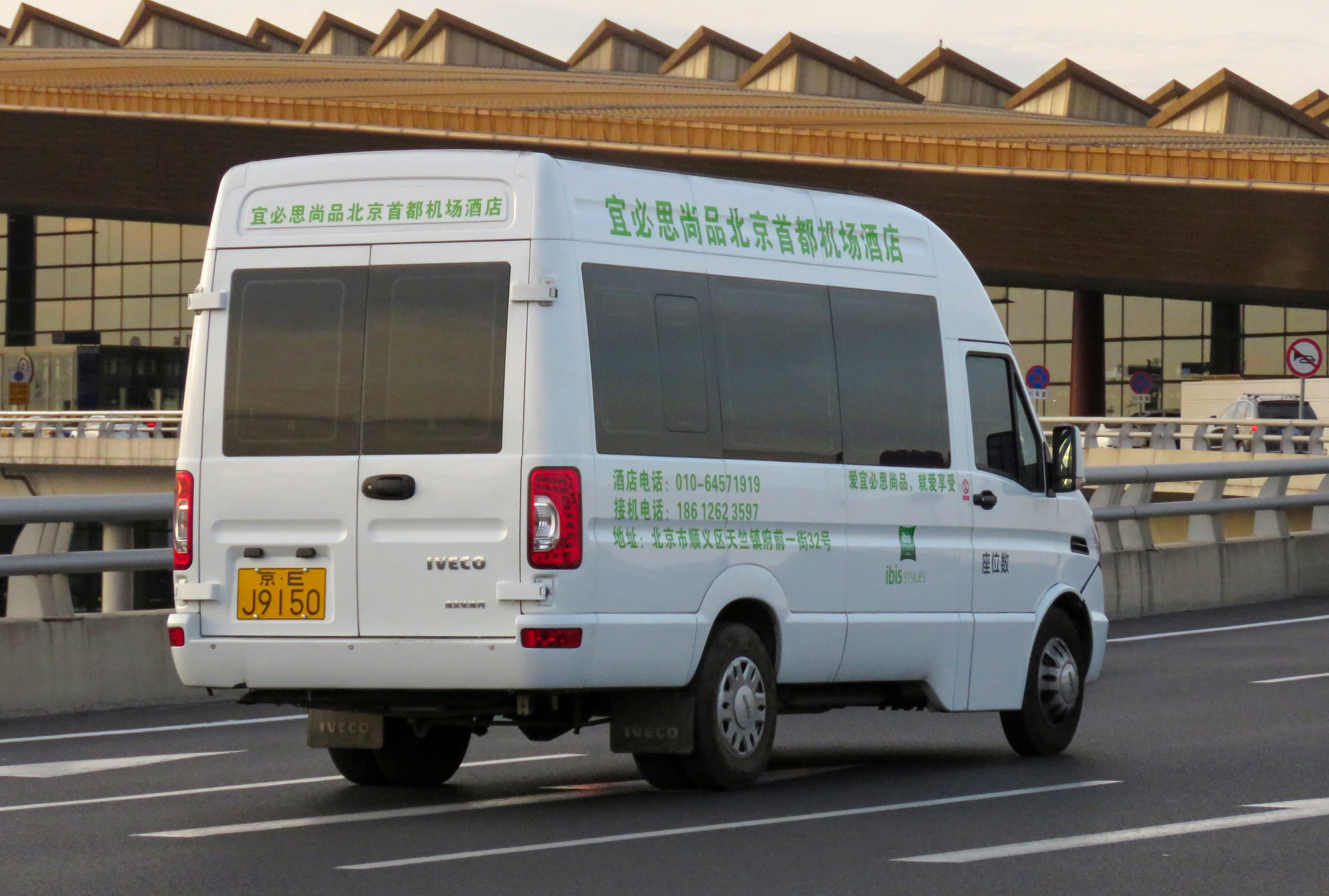
2014–2021 Naveco Power Daily (rear)

==== Iveco Daily Ousheng ====
A version produced by Naveco (Nanjing Iveco) of China called the Iveco Daily Ousheng (欧胜) was a facelift based on the second facelift of the Iveco Daily, and extended production starting from 2017. A mini bus variant called the Oufeng was also available in China. The RV version of the Iveco Daily Ousheng called the Daily Ousheng Tourist RV was rebadged by Maxus and sold as the Maxus H90 in China.

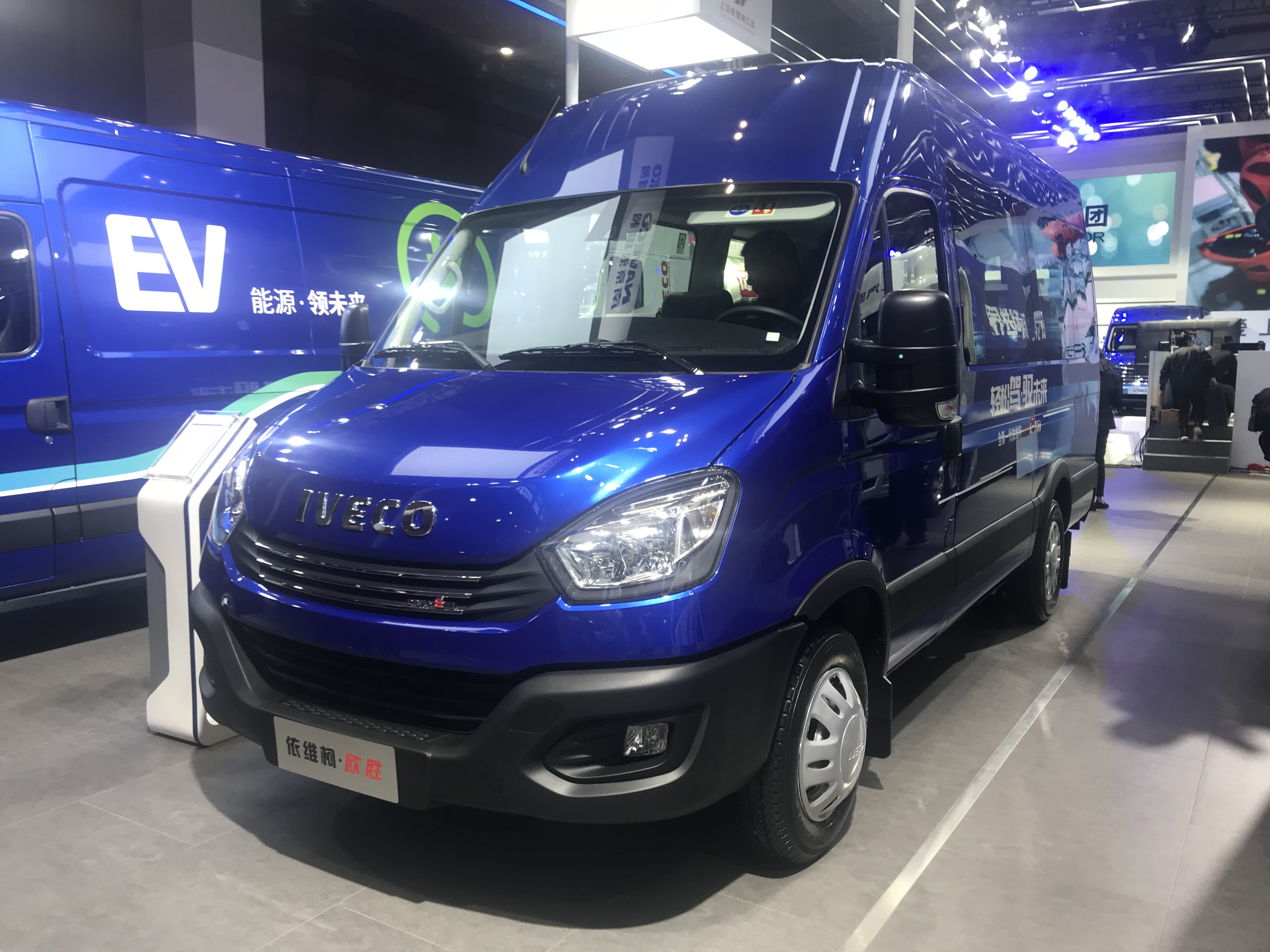
Naveco (Nanjing Iveco) Daily Ousheng

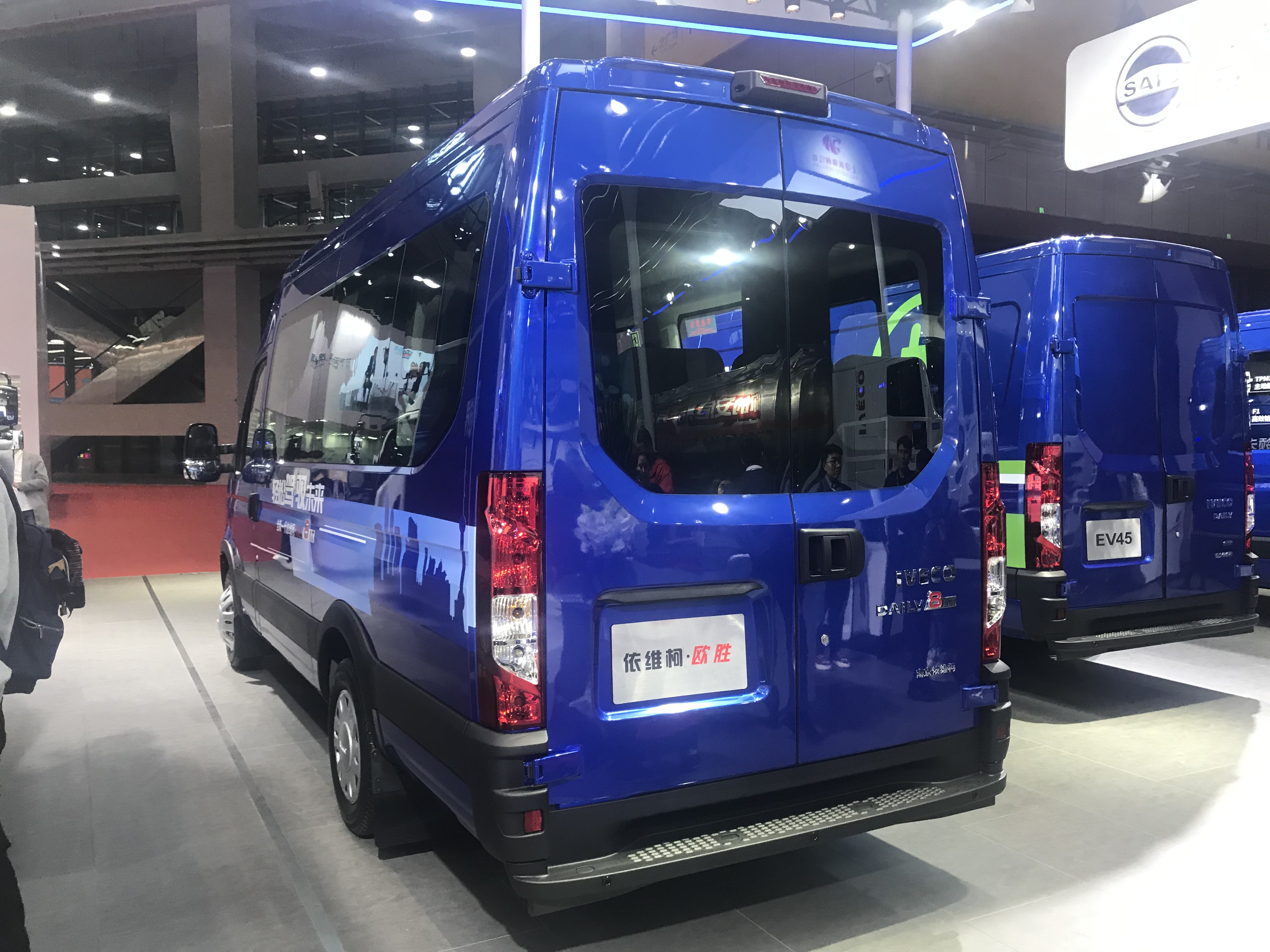
rear view

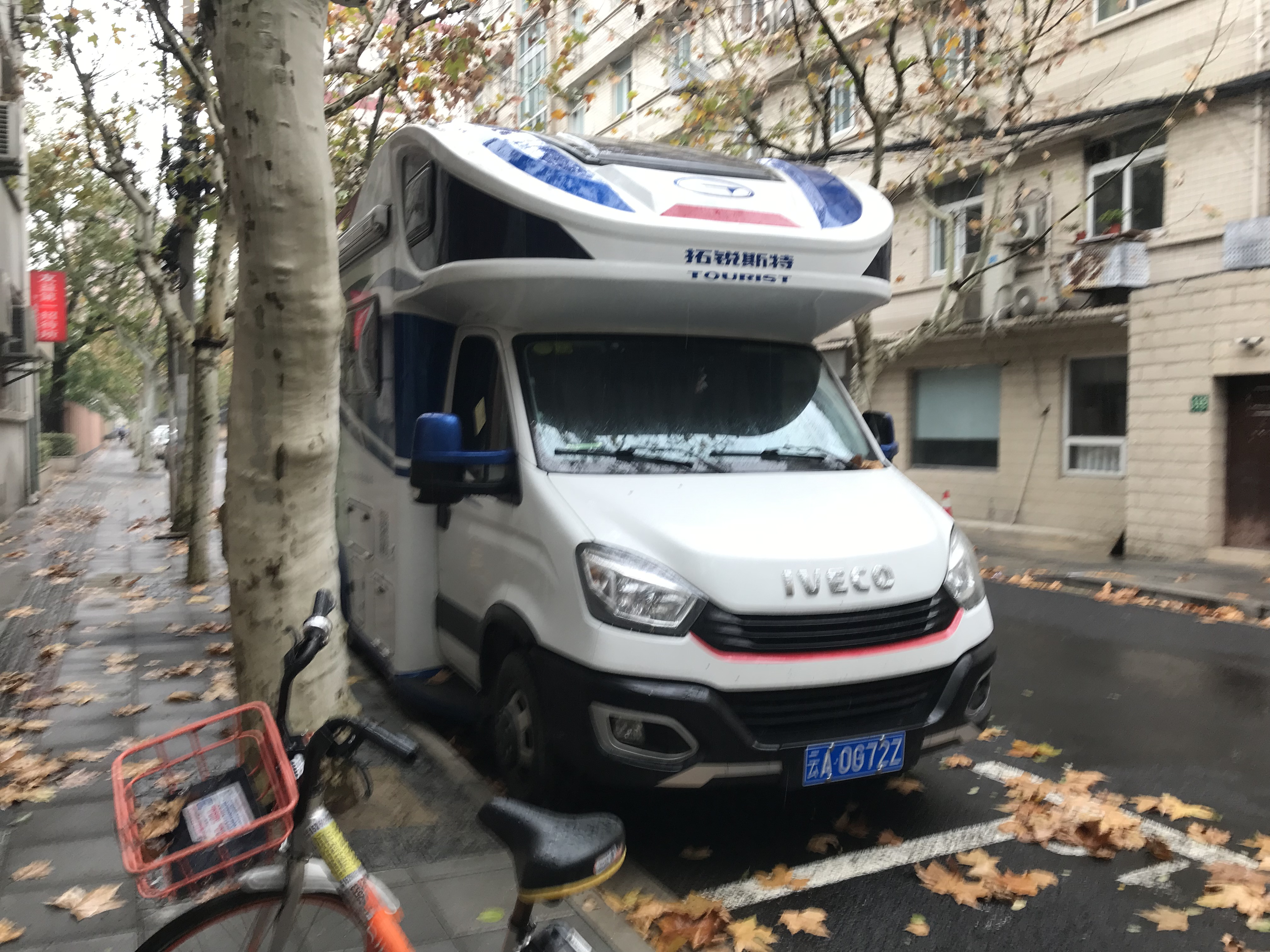
Naveco Daily Ousheng Tourist RV

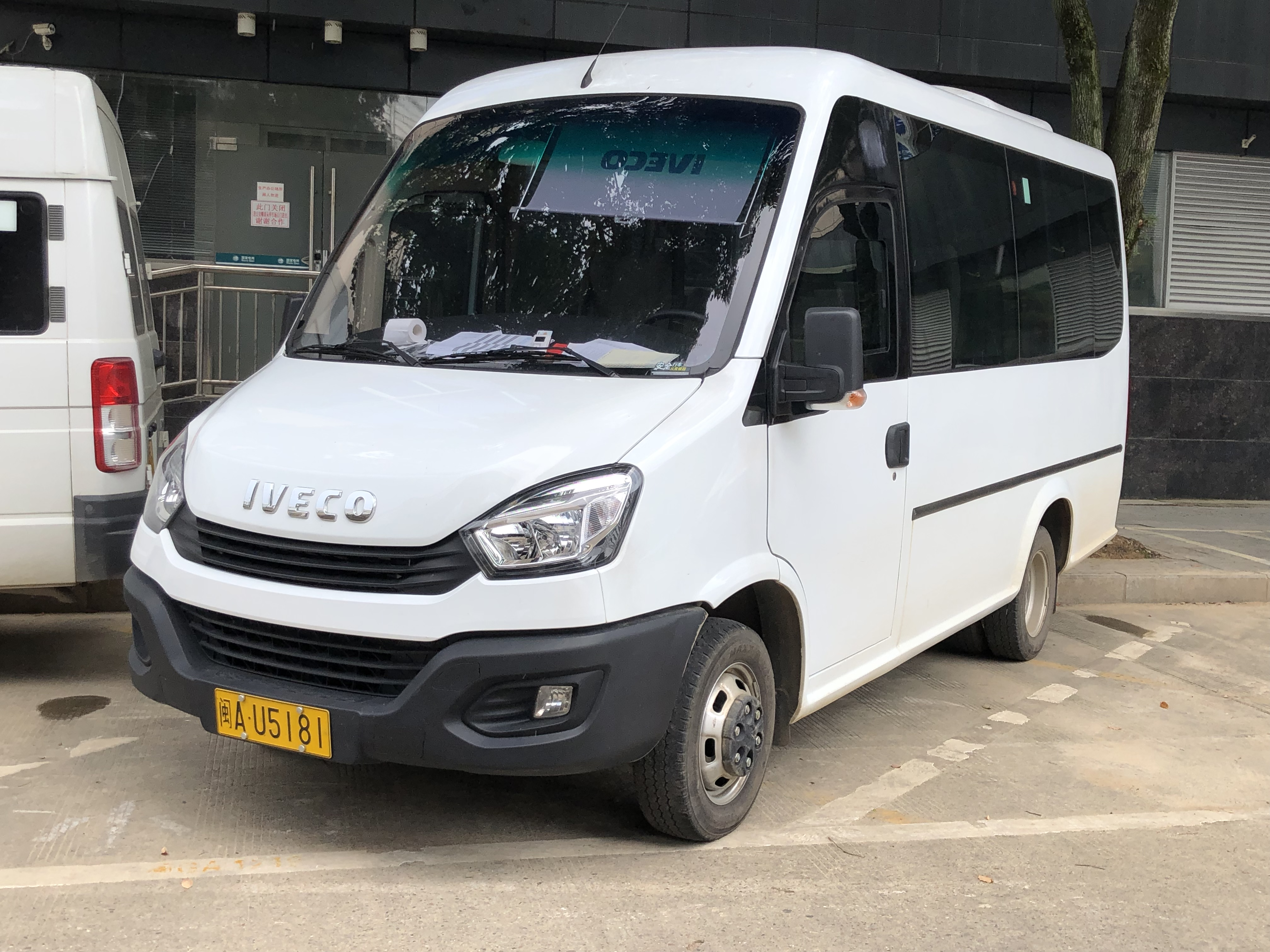
Naveco Daily Oufeng bus

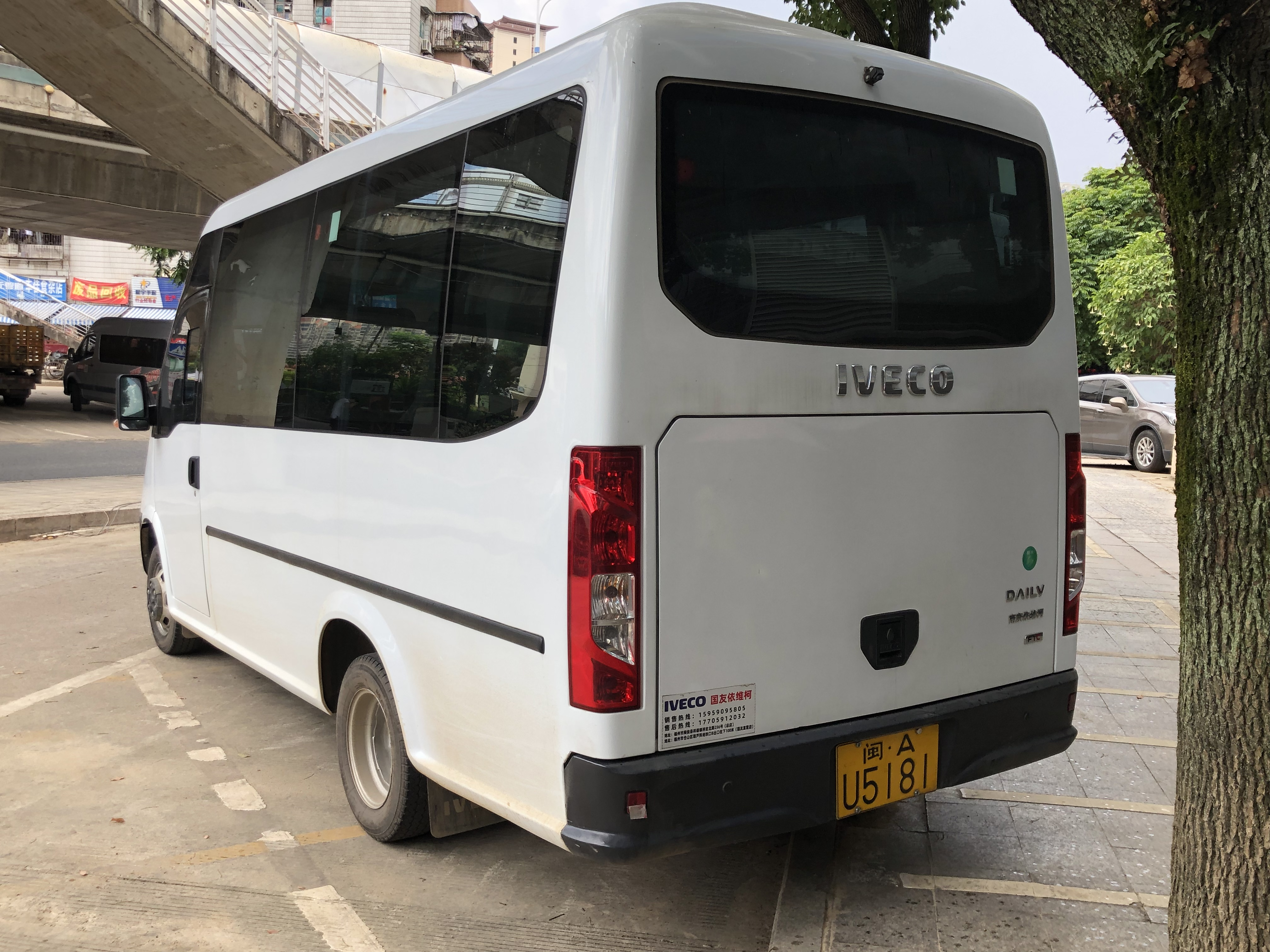
Naveco Daily Oufeng bus rear

== Third generation (2014) ==
Third generation
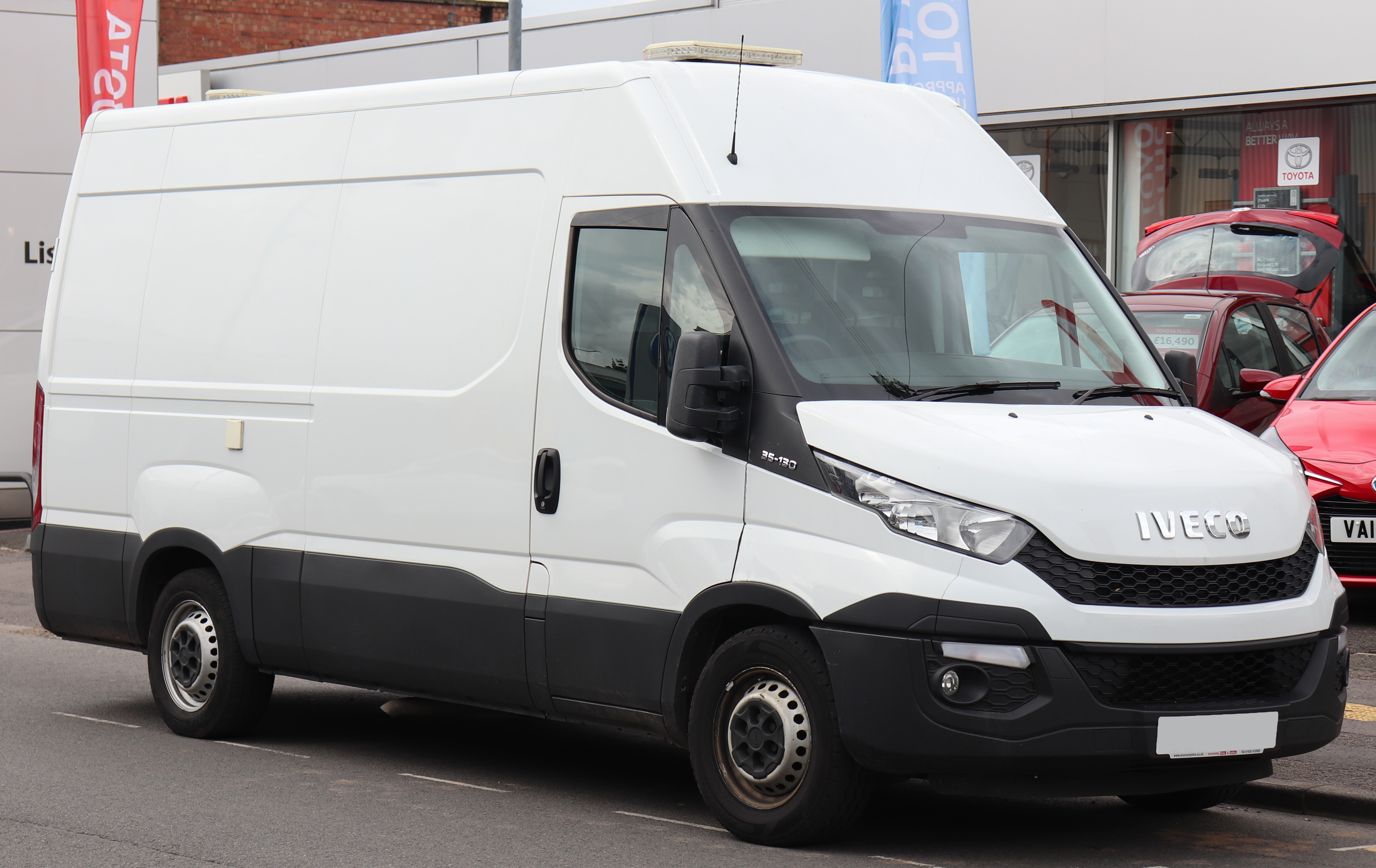

Overview
- Manufacturer: Iveco
- Production: 2014–present
- Assembly: Italy: Suzzara, Province of Mantua (Iveco SpA, Suzzara Plant); Spain: Valladolid (Iveco España, SL, Valladolid Plant); Algeria: Ouled Hedadj (IVAL Industrie SPA); China: Nanjing (Nanjing Iveco Automobile Co Ltd); Australia: Dandenong South; Serbia: Kragujevac; Libya: Tajura (CKD); Brazil: Sete Lagoas; Russia: Nizhny Novgorod (GAZ); Vietnam: Quảng Nam (THACO)

Body and chassis
- Body style: 4-door van 2-door chassis 4-door minibus pickup truck bus
- Layout: Front-engine, rear-wheel-drive Front-engine, four-wheel-drive
- Chassis: Body-on-frame

Powertrain
- Engine: Diesel: 2.3 L turbo I4; 3.0 L turbo I4; CNG; 3.0 L Natural Power EEV turbo I4; Electric: 60 kW; 80 kW
- Transmission: 6-speed manual 8-speed AGILE automatic

Dimensions
- Wheelbase: 3,000–4,750 mm (118.1–187.0 in)
- Length: 5,040–7,674 mm (198.4–302.1 in)
- Height: 2,385–2,940 mm (93.9–115.7 in)
- Curb weight: 2,200–7,000 kg (4,850–15,432 lb)

The third generation Daily was introduced in July 2014. Compared to the previous model, the vehicle has been completely revised; only the range of engines was retained. The selection of body variants, dimensions, wheelbases and payloads has been significantly expanded. According to the manufacturer, 8,000 variants are now available. The high loading area caused by the ladder frame on the Daily V has now been lowered by 55 mm and the often criticized long overhangs have been reduced. To improve driving comfort, the wheel suspension has been redesigned and the seating position of the driver's seat has been improved. The vehicle design was also redesigned and adapted to the requirements of aerodynamics. The standard equipment includes Electronic Stability Control; other safety features such as lane departure warning and a reversing camera are available as options. Also optional is a pneumatic rear suspension designed to make loading and unloading easier. This model received the International Van of the Year award in 2015.

=== Electric version ===
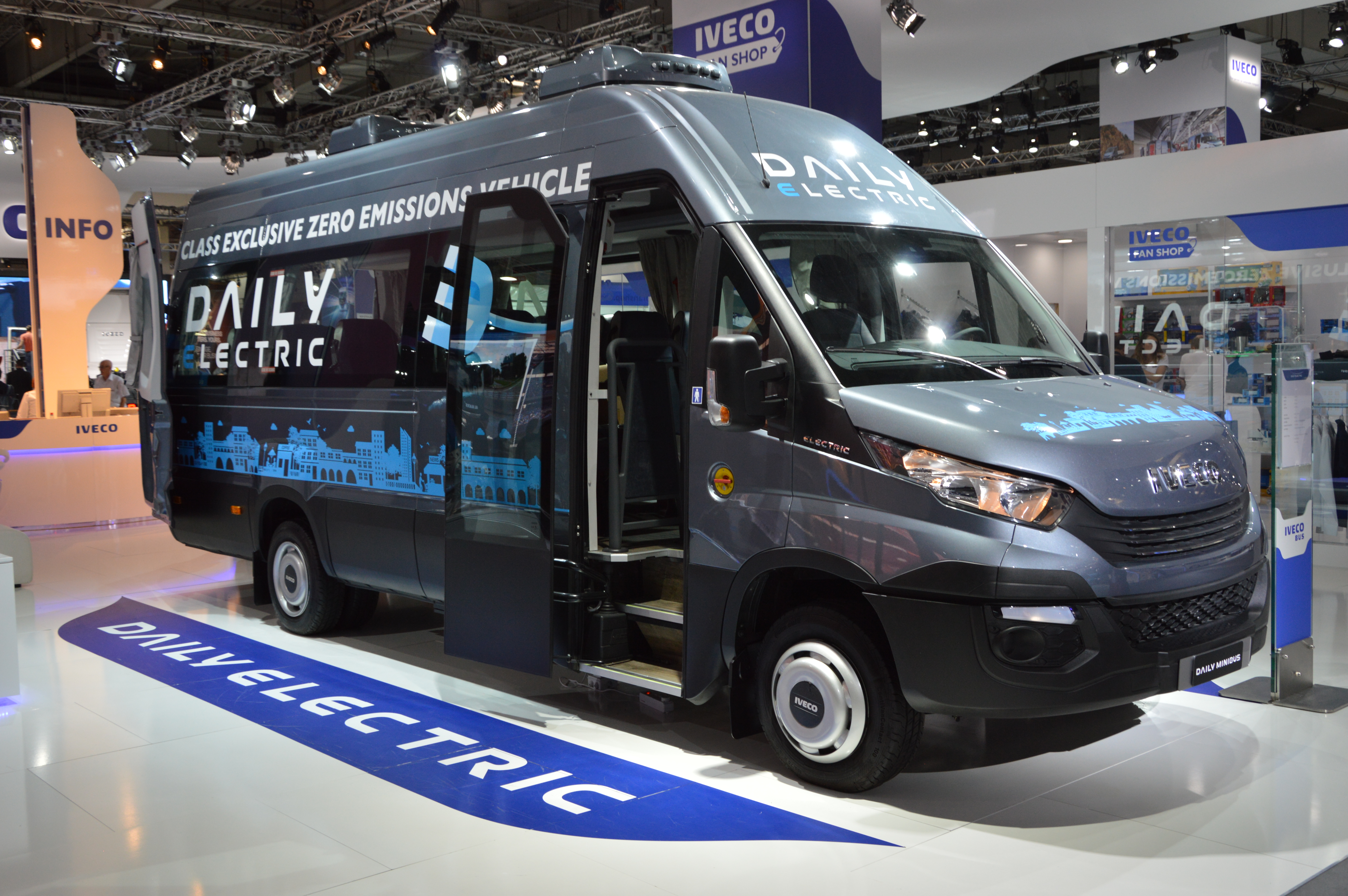
Daily electric as a minibus with 16 seats

Available as a panel van, minibus and chassis, the Iveco Daily Electric is a purely electrically powered vehicle. It is optionally equipped with a 60 or 80 kW electric motor. It takes 10 hours to charge the ZEBRA batteries, or 2 hours in the shortened quick charge mode. The low-noise vehicle is advertised in particular for night deliveries in urban areas and has a range of up to 280 kilometers.

=== Facelift ===
The Daily received a facelift in April 2019, now including full LED headlights, and various driver assistance systems have been added.

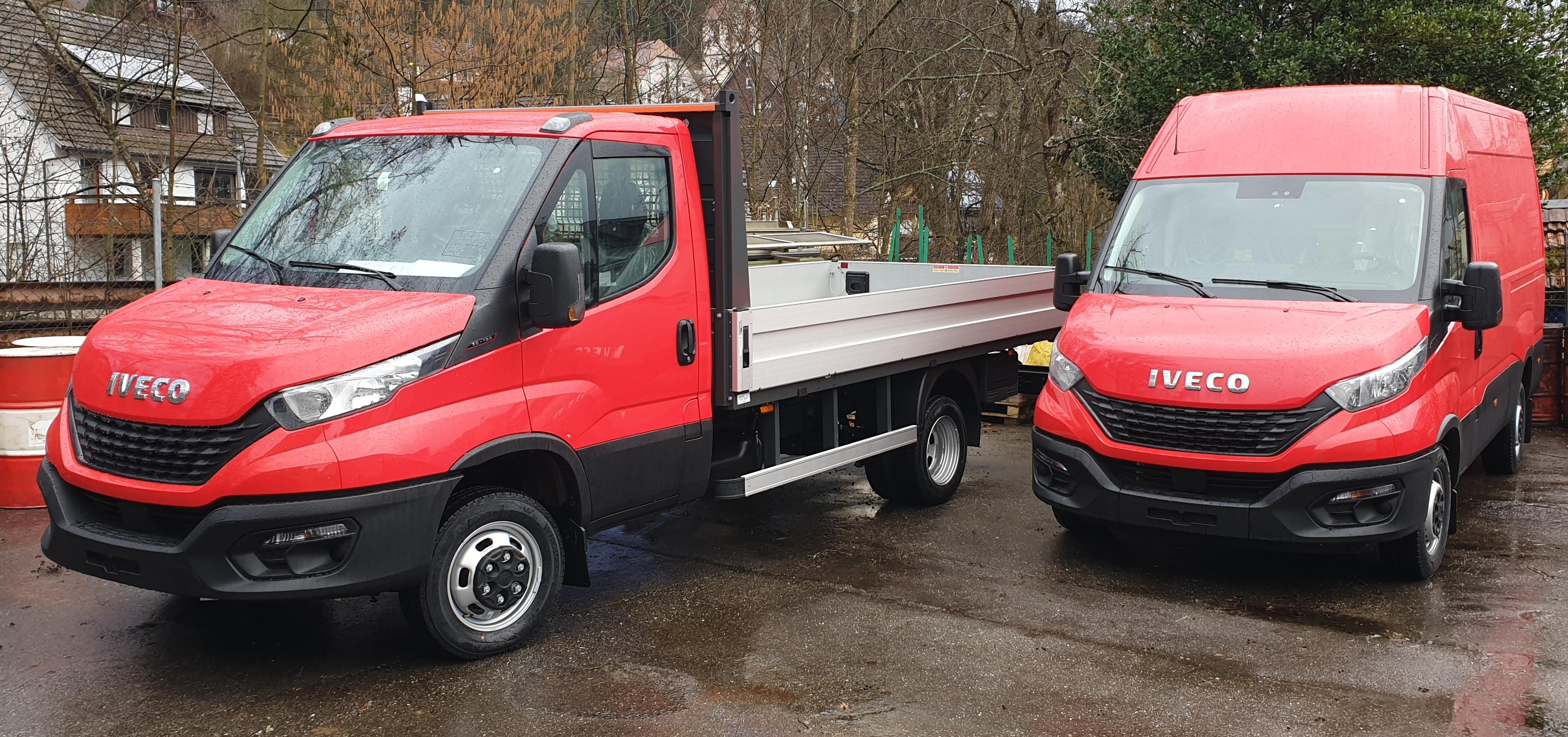
Iveco Daily Facelift (Chassis Cab and Panel Van)

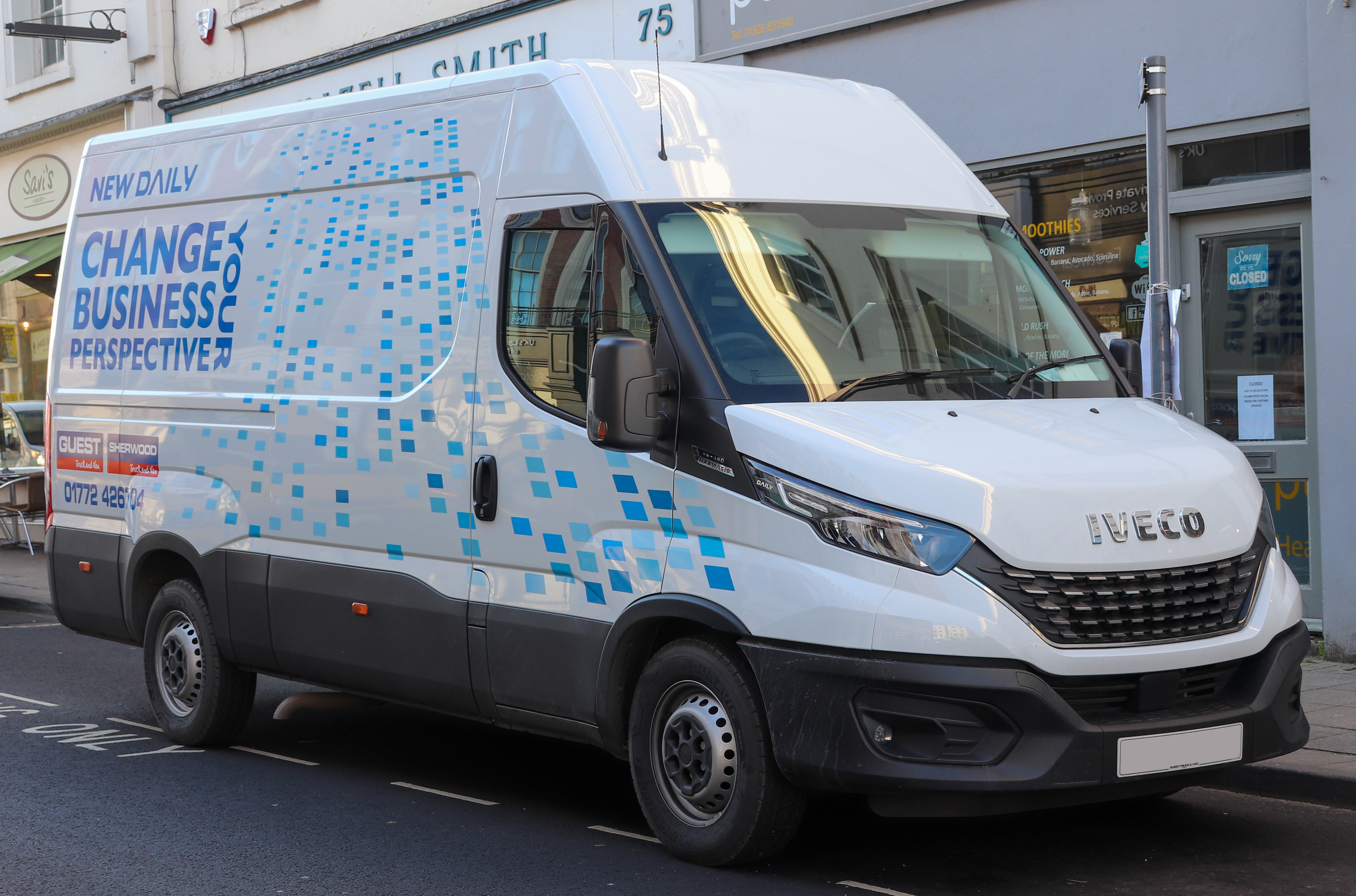
Iveco Daily Hi-Matic (automatic Transmission) Facelift

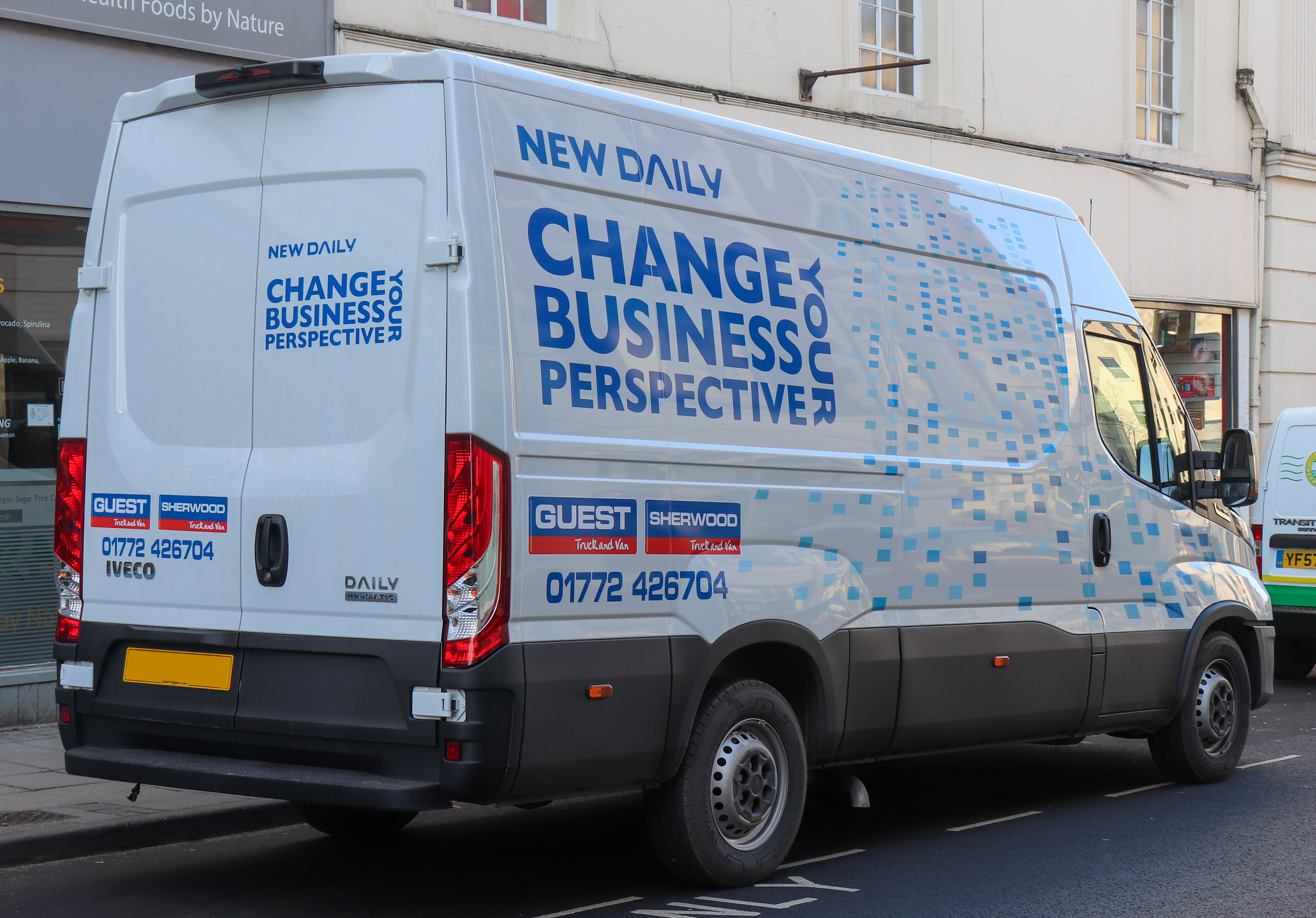
Iveco Daily Hi-Matic Facelift (rear)

=== eDaily (2022) ===
eDaily FCEV is a 7-ton large van.

The eDaily FCEV was first unveiled on 19 September 2022. It is equipped with FPT Industrial's maximum output 140 kW electric motor and 90 kW hydrogen fuel cell system. The charging time is about 15 minutes, and it can drive up to 350 km on a single charge with maximum load of 3 tons.

In 2023, the all-electric Iveco eDaily powered by Microvast's li-ion cells, in its 3.5 Tonne version, claimed the official Guinness World Records title for the Heaviest Weight Towed by an Electric Van.

=== Safety ===
ANCAP test results Iveco Daily (2022)
Overall
Grading:	41% (Silver)

== Other variants ==
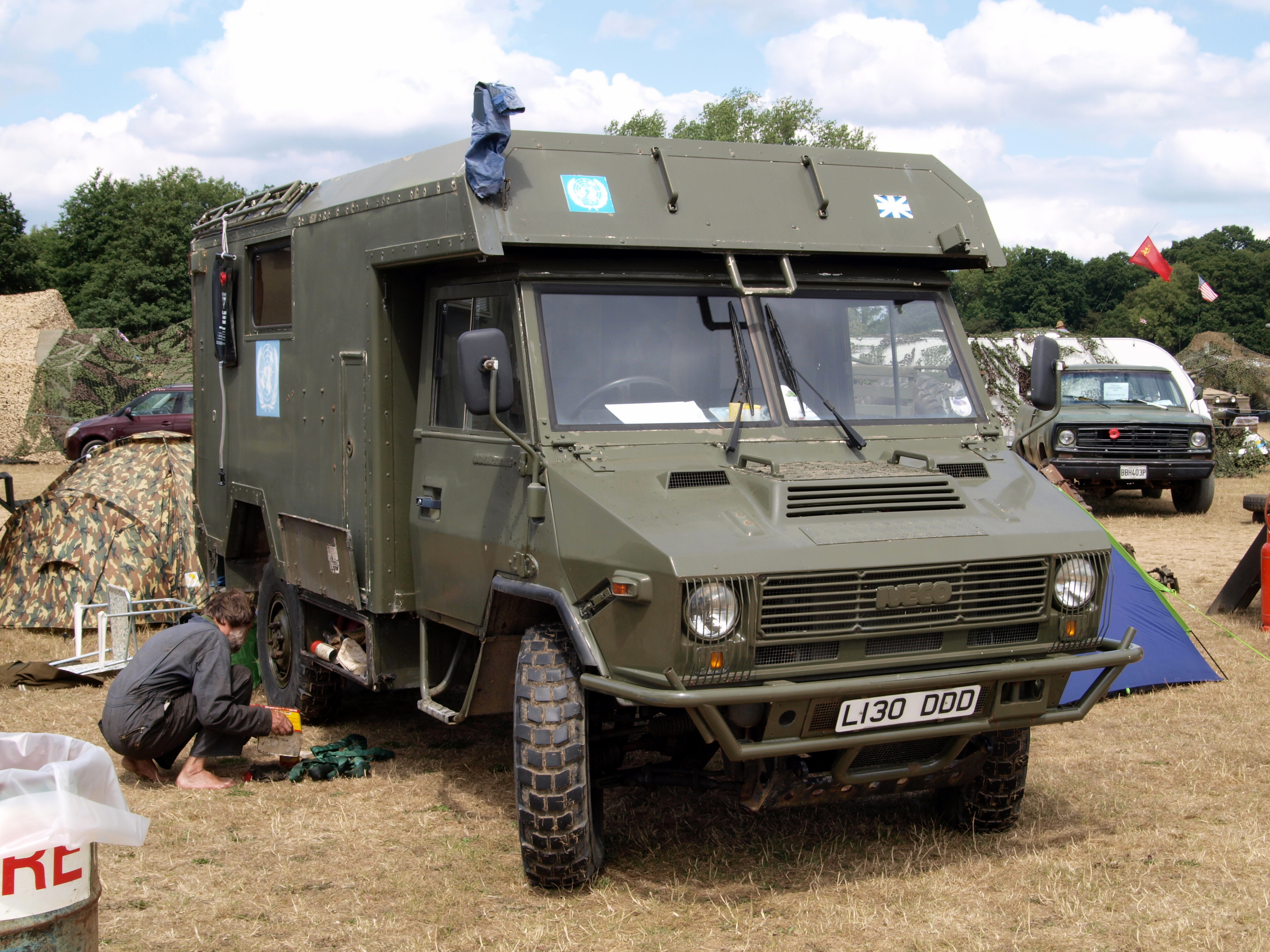
VM 90

- 40.10 WM (4 x 4) 1,500 kg (3,300 lb) light truck series - Officially the VM 90 is the square body military version of the Daily and includes an armored variant.

== See also ==
- DMV Anaconda
- Kozak
