= Fas =

Fas or FAS may refer to:

== Places ==
- Fez, Morocco, alternate spelling
- Poti, Georgia, a port city in Georgia

== Businesses ==
- Federation Air Service, a former Malaysian regional airliner
- Fiat Automobili Srbija, Serbian automobile manufacturer
- Film Authors' Studio, Croatia

== Organizations ==
=== In research and academia ===
- Faculty of Arts and Sciences (disambiguation), of several universities
- Federation of American Scientists
- Federation of Astronomical Societies (mainly UK)

=== In sport ===
- Football Association of Singapore
- Club Deportivo FAS, a Salvadoran football club

=== Other organizations ===
- Federal Antimonopoly Service, Russia
- Femmes Africa Solidarité, an NGO founded in 1996
- FÁS, former training and employment authority of Ireland
- Foreign Agricultural Service, US
- Salvadoran Air Force (Spanish: Fuerza Aérea Salvadoreña)

== In science and technology ==
=== In biology and medicine ===
- Fas receptor or CD95, a receptor protein
- Fatty acid synthase, an enzyme
- Fetal alcohol syndrome, disorders in someone whose mother drank while pregnant with them
- Foreign accent syndrome, of a person speaking their own language

=== Other uses in science and technology ===
- NetApp FAS (fabric-attached storage), for computer data
- Feedback arc set, in graph theory
- Final assembly schedule, in manufacturing

== Other uses ==
- Fas language of Papua New Guinea
- Fas (Roman), the concept of ritual propriety in ancient Roman religion, particularly with regard to lucky and unlucky days of the Roman calendar
- Fas – Ite, Maledicti, in Ignem Aeternum, a 2007 album by Deathspell Omega
- Federal-aid secondary highway system of US Federal Aid Highway System
- Free African Society, an 18th-century African-American community
- Free Alongside Ship, an International Commercial Term
- Financial Assistance Scheme, a part of the UK welfare system
- Frankfurter Allgemeine Sonntagszeitung, a German newspaper
- Fellow of the Anatomical Society, of the UK

== See also ==
- Fass (disambiguation)
- Faas (disambiguation)
- Faz (disambiguation)
