= Zastava Automobiles =

1853–2008 Serbian car manufacturer

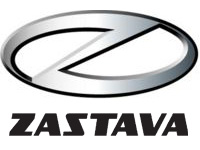
- Zastava logo (2000–2008)
- Native name: Застава Аутомобили
- Romanized name: Zastava Automobili
- Company type: Joint-stock company
- Industry: Automotive
- Founded: 1853; 173 years ago (Original); 11 September 2000; 25 years ago (Current form)
- Defunct: 21 November 2008; 17 years ago
- Fate: Bankruptcy procedure
- Successor: FCA Serbia
- Headquarters: Kosovska 4, Kragujevac, Serbia
- Area served: Worldwide
- Products: Cars and trucks
- Owner: Government of Serbia
- Parent: Group Zastava Vehicles

Zastava Automobiles (Serbian: Застава Аутомобили, Zastava Automobili) was a Serbian and Yugoslav international car manufacturer, a subsidiary of Group Zastava Vehicles which went bankrupt in May 2017.

After many decades of producing different car and truck models under the Zastava brand, the company ceased all vehicle production in 2008. Since then, a new company, FIAT Automobiles Serbia, has taken over the Zastava Automobiles facilities, after extensive reconstruction and renovation.

== Overview ==
- 1853: Founded as a cannon-casting plant
- 1930: Ford trucks assembled for the Yugoslav Army
- 1955: Assembly starts on Fiat models such as the 1100B, 1400 and 600
- 1965: 6,000 cars exported to Poland
- 1980: Fiat 127-based Zastava 102 debuts, becomes the Yugo 45, only Zastava sold in the US
- 1988: Debut of Zastava’s first proprietary model, the Giugiaro-designed Florida hatchback
- 1989: Production peaks at 180,950 units
- 1992: Trade sanctions imposed by UN halt exports and disrupt parts supply
- 1995: End of trade sanctions
- 1999: NATO aircraft bomb plant during the war in Kosovo

Initially, Zastava was widely known for its locally built versions of the Fiat 128 and Fiat 600, and latterly the Zastava 102 - based on the Fiat 127.

During the 1980s, Zastava sold its compact cars in North and South America and Western Europe under the "Yugo" brand, competing in the budget segment of the market alongside other Eastern European brands such as Lada and Skoda. Its final model, the Yugo Sana, was styled by Italian designer Giorgetto Giugiaro and launched in 1988, but its production was cut short by the Yugoslav wars. By the same time the Yugo brand had disappeared from most Western markets by 1991 or 1992. In 1999, the factory was damaged by NATO bombing during the Kosovo War.

The post-Yugoslav era has been difficult for Zastava, just as most of the other major companies based in Serbia, which suffered from hyperinflation, international sanctions, and economic mismanagement. As a result, production almost stopped and the company failed to introduce new models for a long time.

In September 2005, the company signed a new agreement with Fiat to produce a version of the 2003 model Fiat Punto for the Balkans under the name Zastava 10, with a capacity of 16,000 units annually.

In December 2007, Serbia announced that Zastava would be privatized in April 2008.

== History ==
Promotional material depicting the Zastava factory. Particular emphasis was added on making clear Yugoslavia was not aligned with the USSR.

=== Origins ===
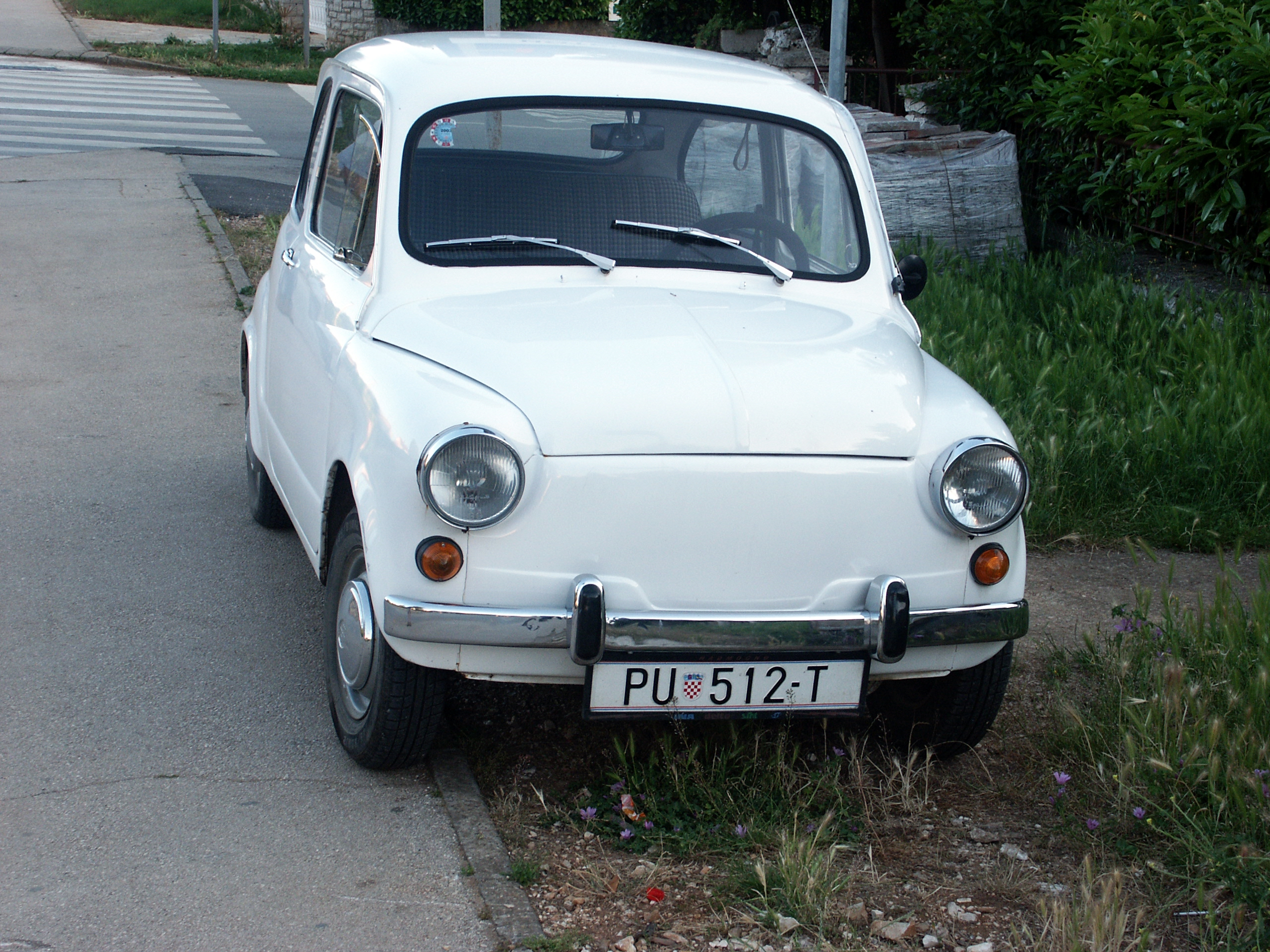
Zastava 750

The roots of Zastava lay in the 1851 founding in Kragujevac of the Vojno-Tehnicki Zavod (Military Technical Institute). The institute developed a cannon foundry division in 1853, becoming a military vocational school in March 1854. During the 1880s, Zastava also began with the production of firearms. At the end of the 19th century the cannon foundry changed its name to the Military Engineering Works. The firm rapidly expanded its production program and the complexity and quality of its products. That original company is now known as Zastava Arms.

In 1904, within the company, a section dedicated to automobiles was inaugurated. Beside repair services, certain car parts were also manufactured. In 1939, it begins assembling Chevrolet military trucks. Production came to a halt in 1941 with the Axis invasion of Yugoslavia and, by then, 400 trucks had come out of the factory which consisted of a working force of 12,000 men.

=== 1950s ===
After World War II, the plant was renamed Zavodi Crvena Zastava ("Red Flag Factories"). In a referendum held on August 26, 1953, 96% of the employees of then Zavodi Crvena Zastava voiced their desire to produce automobiles. That year, 162 Willys Jeeps would leave the Kragujevac factory.

On 12 August 1954, Zastava signed a cooperation agreement with Fiat. Three months later, Kragujevac began assembling the Fiat 1400, 1100 B and AR-55 Campagnola.

Fiat 1400 was Zastava's first assembled automobile, but Fića Zastava's licence built version of Fiat 600 is its iconic historical brand. 923,487 of Zastava 750 were produced over a span of 30 years, with several different engines and in various equipment levels, from 18 October 1955 to 18 November 1985.

Total vehicle production in 1955 was 1,044, and by 1958 it had risen to 3,596. During 1957 and 1958, Zastava established a supplier network. Zastava outsourced engine manufacture to Rakovica-based 21. Maj (DMB).

=== 1960s ===
Zastava's annual production climbed to 13,719 units in 1960. The company entered the new decade with a replacement for the 1400: Fiat's 1100, shown in Geneva as the successor to the 1100 B.

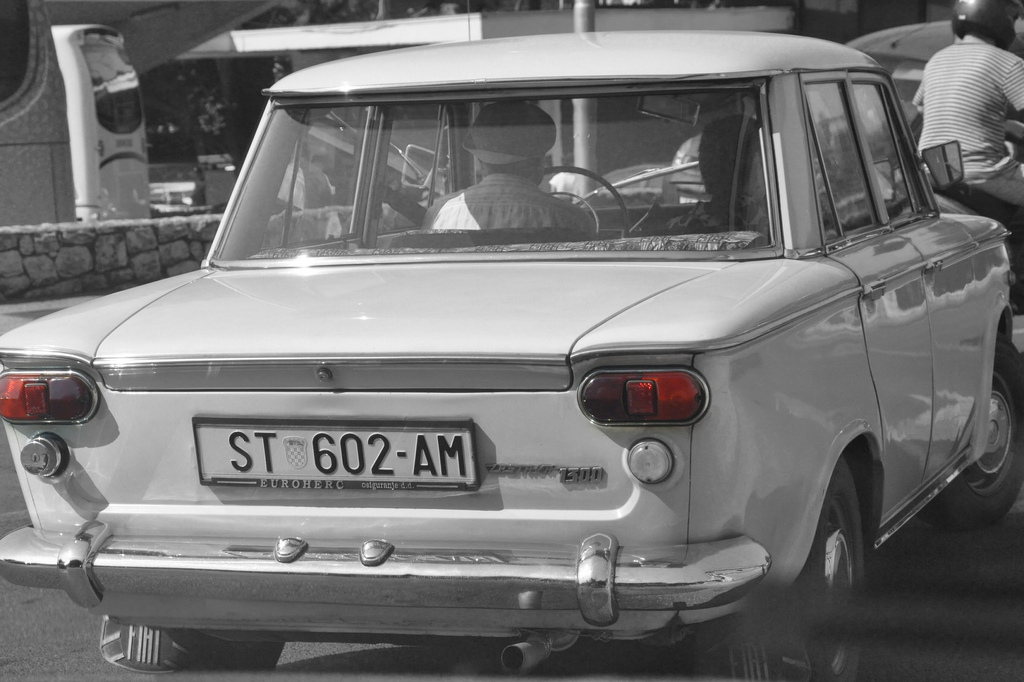
Zastava 1300

With the advent of the 1961 Fiat 1300 and 1500 came Zastava's 1300/1500 series, produced as both sedans and wagons. With all-around disc brakes, rear-wheel drive and up to 72 horsepower, the "tristać" was Yugoslavia's favorite upmarket car. Today, many across the former Yugoslavia recall the 1300 as Zastava's best automobile ever: the Jugoslovenski Mercedes as they call it. 201,160 copies of the 1300 and 1500 were produced from 1961 to 20 December 1979.

The Fića had started life as the 22 PS (16 kW) 633 cc Fiat 600, designed by legendary Fiat engineer Dante Giacosa. In 1962, Zastava began production of the Fiat 600D, badged Zastava 750, boasting a 25 PS (18 kW) 767 cc engine capable of propelling the car to 110 km/h (68 mph).

The floorpan of the 1300/1500 was used as the basis for the Polski Fiat 125p, which was produced by Polish FSO from Zastava CKD kits. The 125p was created by mating the body of the Fiat 125 to the mechanicals (engines, gearbox, transmission and suspension) of the 1300 and 1500. On the Yugoslav market, the 125p was known as the Zastava 125PZ.

1965 marked the official beginning of Zastava exports, with 6,000 cars sent to Poland.

In 1967, Zastava produced about 52,000 trucks and passenger cars, and 53,000 in 1968.

Zastava in this decade signed a new contract expanding production and technological cooperation with Fiat. A $10 million investment pushed annual capacity to 85,000, with plans in place to reach 130,000 units within a five-year period.

In 1969, the Zastava Kamioni (Zastava Trucks) division split from Zastava Automobili and began producing Italy's Om trucks, rated for between 2.5 and 4 tons. Today, Zastava Kamioni continues to make trucks through a partnership with Iveco.

=== 1970s ===
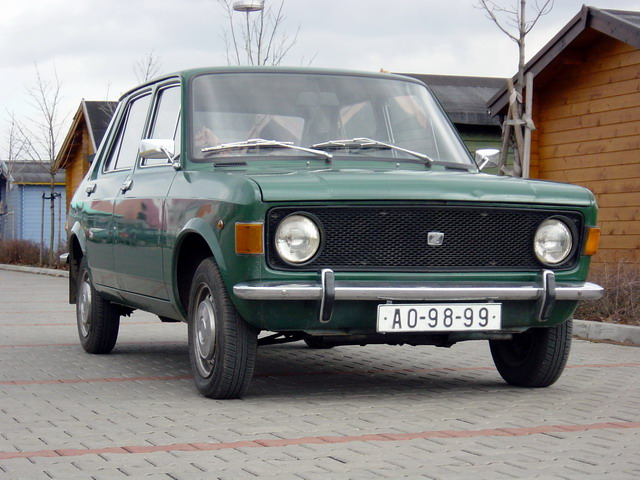
1976 Zastava 101 (from Kragujevac, sold as Zastava 1100 in Czechoslovakia)

In 1970, Zastava launched the 750M, fitted with a new 767 cc engine boasting a thermostat-controlled pressurised cooling system.

In the beginning of the 1970s, Zastava arranged with Fiat to produce the Zastava 101 (4 cyl, 1116 cc OHC, 55 hp, front wheel drive), which was based on the Fiat 128. It had restyled rear panel and resembled a hatchback body style. This 3- and 5-door variant of the Fiat 128 was specific to Zastava and was never released elsewhere by Fiat.

It was said that the model 101 should be produced in Yugoslavia for both the Yugoslav and Italian markets and vice versa; in the Italian market, it would have been sold under the marque Innocenti. It was soon nicknamed Stojadin as a pun on sto jedan (101) (Stojadin is a male name, although folk etymology also associates it with sto jada, "a hundred woes", due to the poor performance and assembly). In spite of this negative record, the car was a good seller in the domestic market as there was a virtual monopoly. Yugoslavs used to buy it because of its moderate price, simple mechanics, cheap spare parts and low maintenance cost compared to other cars assembled in Yugoslavia.

In 1979, the Zastava 750S – (Special) was released which offered updated interior controls and switches, a new steering wheel and a sportier 22 kW (30 hp) engine which raised the car's top speed to 120 kilometres per hour (75 mph).

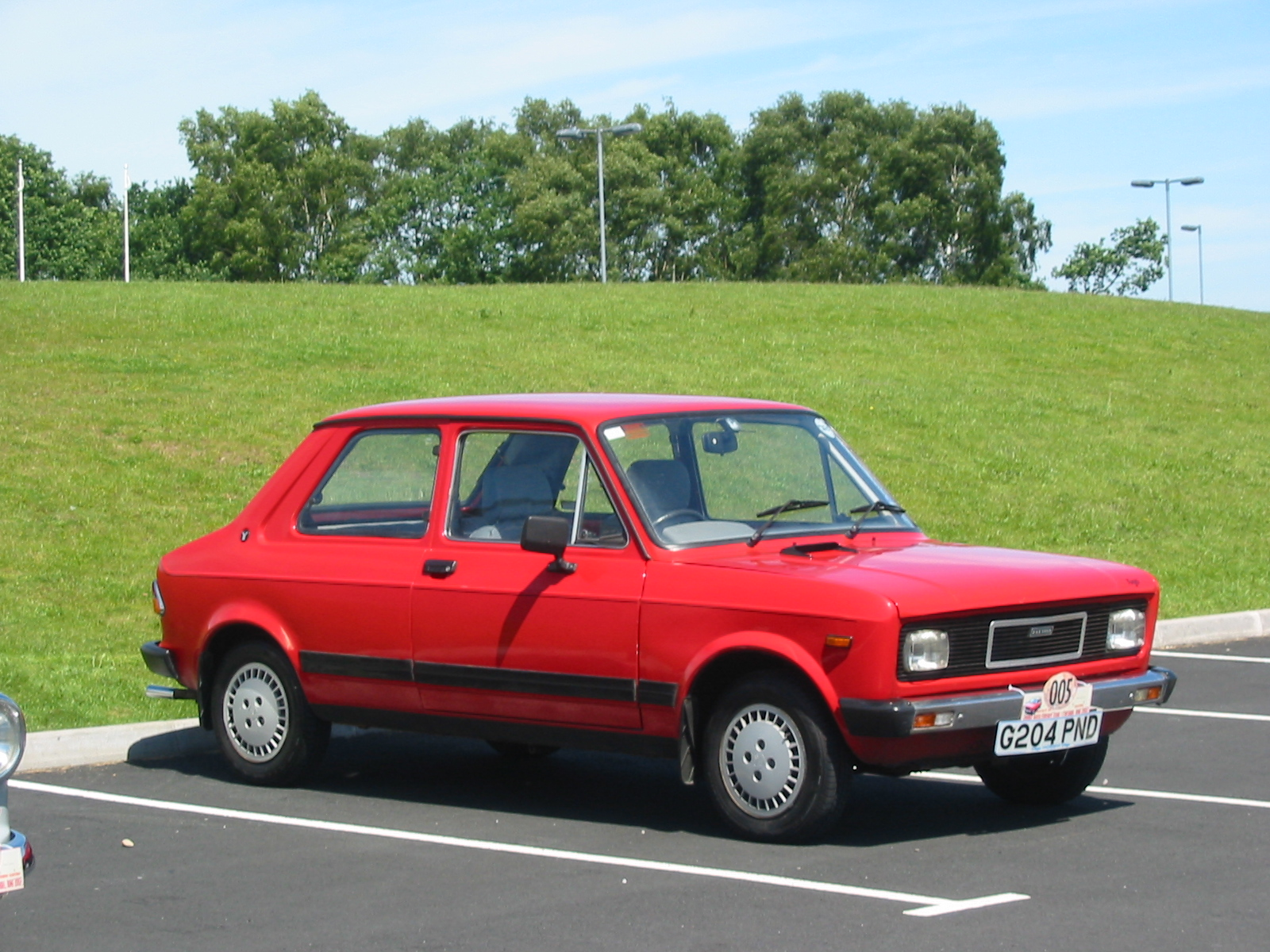
A 1989 Zastava 311 (Zastava Skala) in the UK

=== 1980s ===
In 1980, the Zastava 850 was launched, with a 32 PS (24 kW) 848 cc engine propelling it to 125 km/h (78 mph) and a fully synchronized transaxle. Production of the 750 and 850 continued until 1985 in L, LE and SC versions.

In the mid-seventies, Zastava management decided to develop a new model, still based on the same Fiat engine. It was originally to be known as Zastava 102, but the name was dropped in 1981 and the car released as Yugo 45. It was styled by Zastava with some help from Fiat engineers. It was a shortened Fiat 128 and it followed the style of the Fiat 127 and Autobianchi A112 but with a more square appearance. Several variants were made, with 903 cc, 1116 cc, and 1301 cc engines.

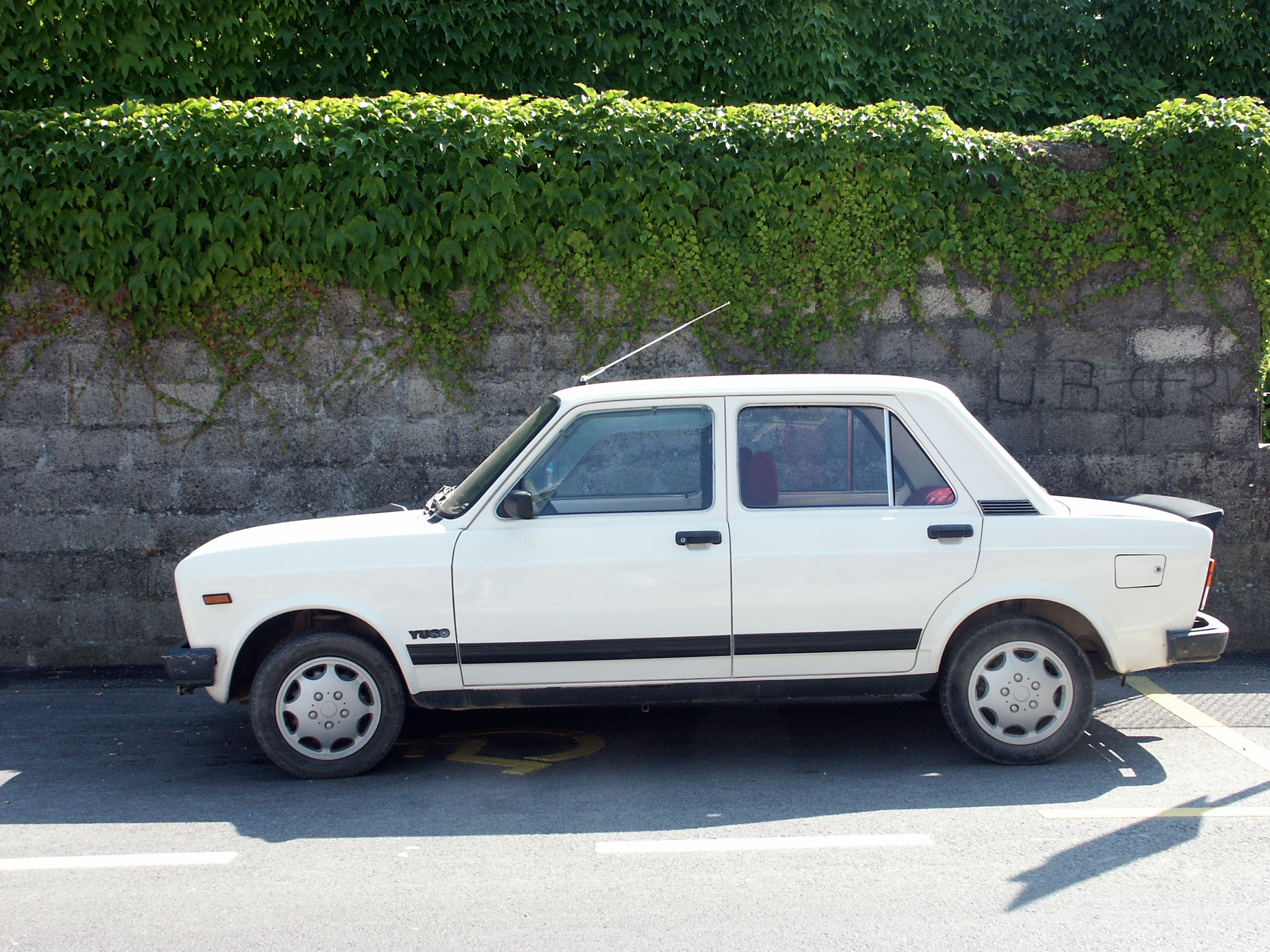
Zastava 128

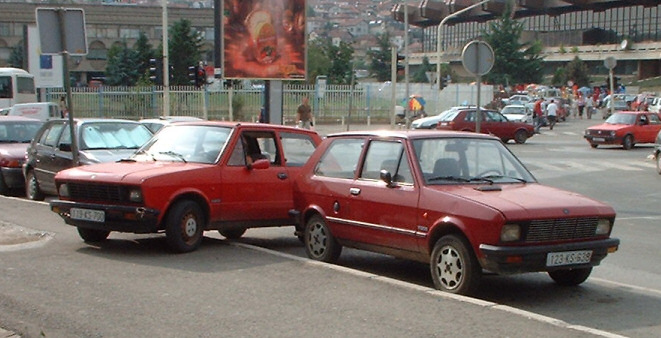
The Yugo, the only Zastava to be marketed in the United States

In 1981, Zastava entered the British market. 811 cars were registered that year, with sales increasing to 3,101 in 1982, their first full year. In 1983, export sales accounted for over a sixth of Zastava's production. Later in the 1980s, Yugo was exported to USA and at the same time it went through several modifications, most importantly the adoption of a five-speed gearbox. In the same decade, Zastava changed its branding name to Yugo and derivative models were renamed: original Zastava Yugo to Zastava Koral and Zastava 101/128 to Zastava Skala or Yugo Skala. The original numerical classification would remain unchanged for some export markets, as for the United Kingdom.

These were Zastava's best years in number of cars assembled; around 230,000 cars a year towards the end of decade. Zastava cars were to be sold in 70 countries at the time, with 27,000 exported to Western markets. The factory also started to make trucks, under a Iveco licence.

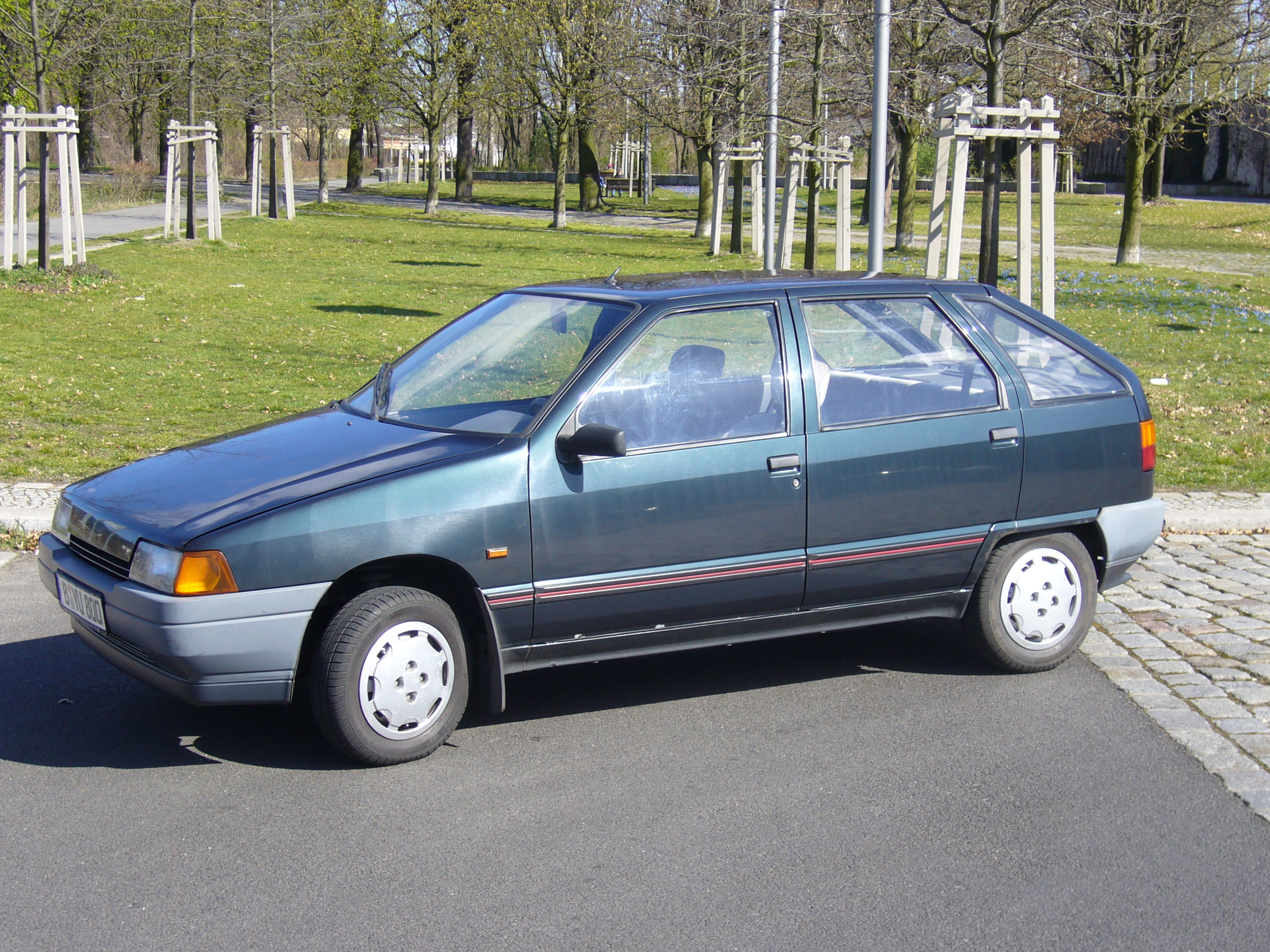
Yugo Florida from the early 1990s

=== 1990s ===
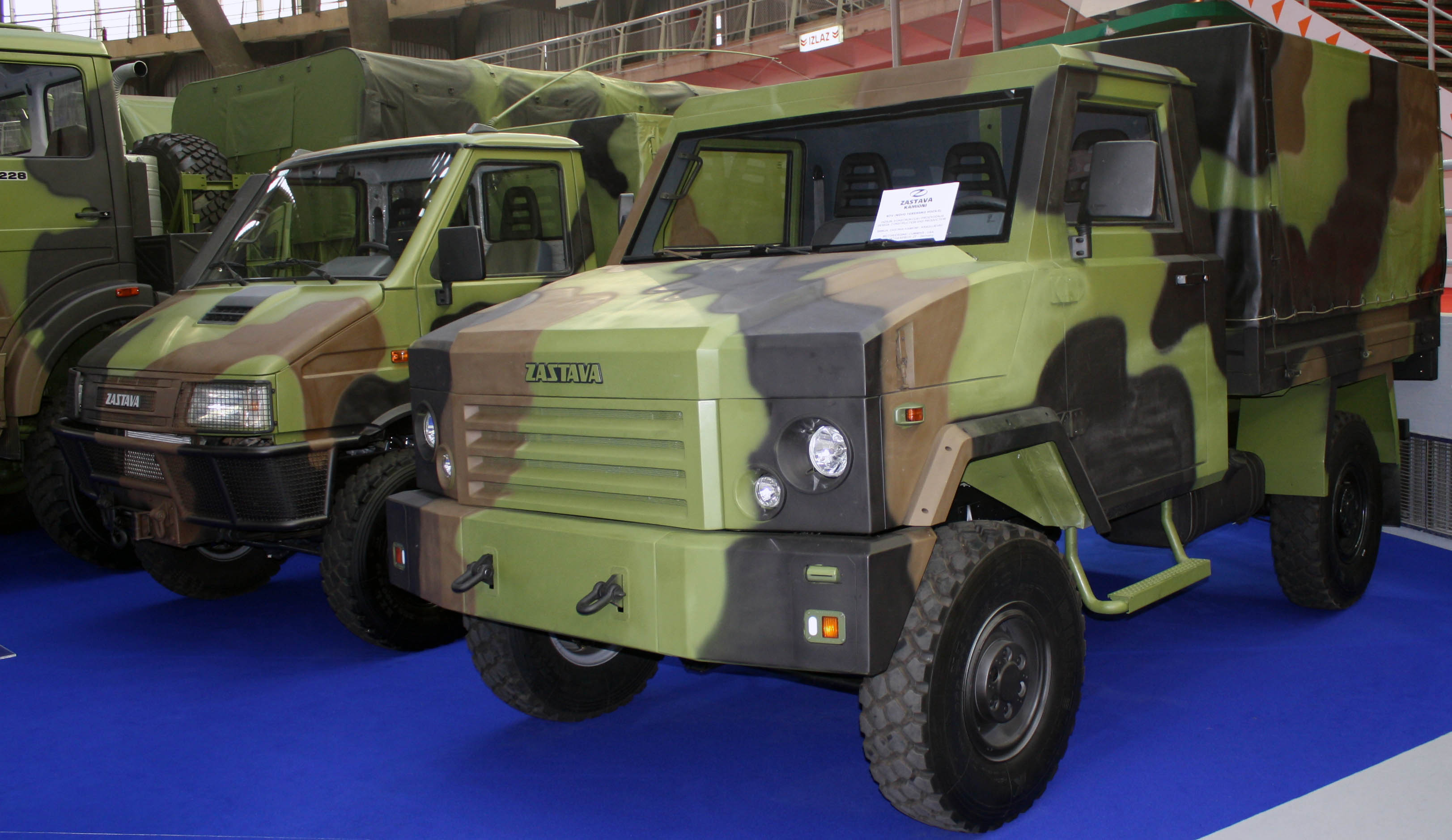
Zastava military vehicles, based on the Iveco Daily

In 1988 a new model was released called the Zastava Florida (known as Yugo Sana or Yugo Sana Miami, in some countries). Its exterior was designed by Giorgetto Giugiaro, with a body shape similar to a Fiat Tipo (1988) or Citroën ZX (1991).

In the early 1990s, Zastava was affected greatly by the breakup of Yugoslavia. The factory production became unstable because of a problem with supplies. Exports were impossible during those years, because of trade sanctions imposed on Yugoslavia. As a result, its cars disappeared from most foreign markets after 1992. Production stopped in 1993, even though there was a waiting list for Yugo cars.

Between 1992 and 1995, it was under UN sanctions, and then between 1998 and 2000, it was under EU and US sanctions. As a result, many Zastava subsidiaries abroad were forced to cease trading, such as Zastava (GB) Ltd. in the United Kingdom and Yugo Cars in the United States.

In 1999, during the Kosovo War, NATO bombed the factory in Kragujevac, Serbia because Zastava Arms was a major military supplier to the Serb government. Some of the car manufacturing buildings were damaged and numerous workers were injured.

=== 2000s ===
After the war, there were trade talks with Hungarian firms to assemble Yugos in Hungary, but no agreement was reached because of the Yugoslavian partner's hesitation. However, Zastava Trucks were assembled in Hungary, near Pécs, with Iveco engines.

Yugos were facelifted and new versions are introduced in the Belgrade International Motor Show in 2002. The new Zastava Koral IN had a 1.1l 55HP engine with Bosch electronic injection, the transmission designed by Porsche, slightly new internal and external design, improved safety, and many extra details which were missing from former models. Koral In also have Peugeot 1.1L, 60HP engine.

The new generation of Yugo was granted a FIA certificate, so it was in compliance with European standards.

In October 2000, Vojislav Koštunica became the new president of Yugoslavia (also a Yugo Koral owner) and soon after, the sanctions against the country were lifted the exports resumed. The production had fallen to a mere 9 per cent of its pre-1990 230,000-vehicle annual capacity, with exports at around 4,000 vehicles. The new Yugoslav government embarked on a $50 million reorganization effort in cooperation with the World Bank, which resulted in mass layoffs, aiming to privatize the company.

A new prototype for the Yugo Florida, known as the Florida 2.0, was made, equipped with the same engine as in the Fiat Bravo 2.0.

=== Cancelled project: Zastava Motor Works ===
In 2002, the American entrepreneur Malcolm Bricklin, who had previously imported Yugo into the United States, signed a deal with Zastava to reintroduce the company's products into America. Bricklin's intention was to sell the cars for less than $10,000 under the brand name ZMW (as in Zastava Motor Works). Even though a website proclaiming the brand's arrival was produced by Bricklin's company, by 2006 his intentions had switched to importing products from Chinese car maker Chery instead.

Also there were produced some unknown models from the beginning of the 1990s and after 2000 as the respond of new market demands. Such models were: Yugo GV Turbo (90's), Yugo Electra (90's), Zastava Koral In (euro-concept), Zastava Globus Koral In (electromobile), Zastava Florida Caravan, Zastava Florida Sedan.

=== 2005–2008 ===
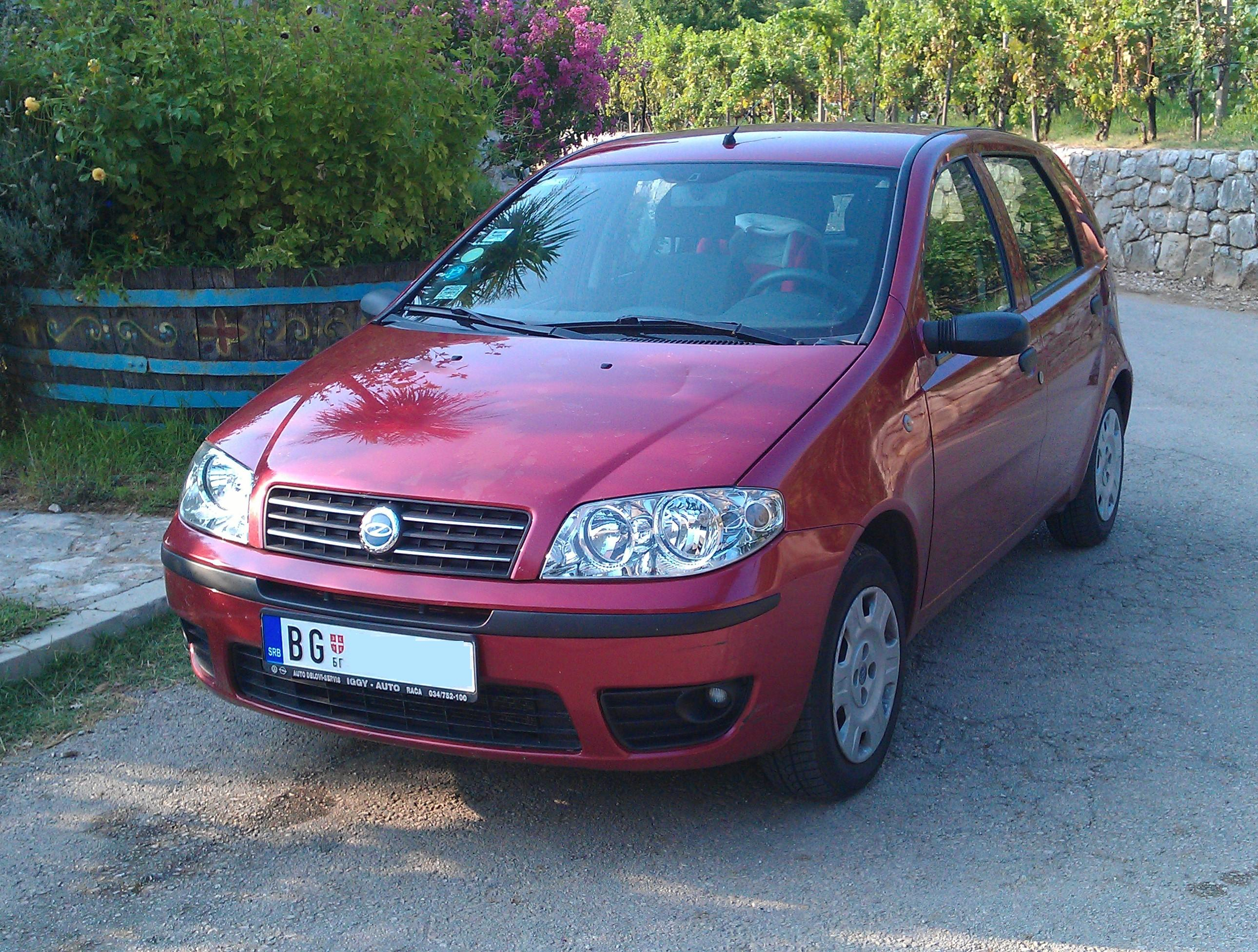
Zastava 10

Zastava automobiles have been sold and exported in Serbia, Bosnia and Herzegovina, Montenegro, Croatia, North Macedonia, Greece, Bulgaria, Lebanon, Libya, Syria, Ecuador, Tunisia, Poland, and Egypt (where Zastava cars were produced under the marque of the state owned Nasr car company). CEO of Zastava cars Zoran Radojević has declared that the company has received offers from African countries for technology transfer. It is believed that Congo was interested in starting production of the Zastava Florida and Egypt of the Zastava 128.

In October 2005, an agreement with Fiat was reached for production of the Fiat Punto by Zastava for Eastern European markets, which would be commercialed as the Zastava 10. The Koral IN L, with a fuel injected 1.1 L Peugeot engine, met the European Union safety standards in a test supervised by the German Technischer Überwachungsverein (Technical Monitoring Association). This was seem as a chance to pave the way for export to EU countries.

The Zastava 10, based on the Italian Fiat Punto Mark 2b, was the last Zastava's most modern car before this factory was taken by Fiat.

Optional features included dual front airbags and air conditioning, as well as power windows. Although the Zastava 10 was Zastava's newest and best model at that time, it faced fierce competition in its home market against cars like the Volkswagen Polo. However, it had some advantages over many of its rivals, including price. As of December 2007, Zastava 10 price started at €7,550 in the Serbian market. In March 2007, the Zastava 10's share of the Serbian car market was 11% and the company started exporting cars to former Yugoslav republics in the first half of 2007, and with plans to add to Bulgaria and Albania as well.

Production of all Zastava cars (Yugo, Skala 101 and Florida) ceased by November 20, 2008. After that day, the only car in production was to be Zastava 10 which has had its front part slightly modified and its name was changed to Punto Classic.

In addition to the Punto Classic (ex-Zastava 10), Zastava was negotiating with Fiat for the production rights to another model not yet in production, a C-segment sedan, codenamed Project D200, to be manufactured for Fiat by Zastava and/or Tofaş of Turkey. It was considered to compete with the Dacia Logan.

Zastava signed an agreement with General Motors to produce the Opel Astra G, but despite the start of industrial tests in Kragujevac, the project was eventually aborted.

=== 2008 shutdown and bankruptcy ===
Fiat Group Automobiles (FGA) has signed a memorandum of understanding with the Serbian government for the acquisition of Zastava's Kragujevac plant on 7 May 2008. The memorandum of understanding foresees a new company being set up in which the Italian group would have a 67% of stake and the Serbian government acquiring 33% of stake in the new company. A new company was named Fiat Automobili Srbija.

The new company would make a total investment in the region of 700 million euros, with the government contributing 200 million euros to this. The Zastava plant would produce two new Fiat models, rejecting previous reports the plant could produce the 500 compact city car.

The last Zastava branded car rolled out of the factory on 21 November 2008.

In May 2017, Group Zastava Vehicles, consisted of Zastava Automobiles, Zastava Trucks, Zastava INPRO and Zastava Special Automobiles, filed for bankruptcy before the Economic Court in Kragujevac.

Group Zastava Vehicles and its subsidiaries entered a bankruptcy procedure in 2018, with the Group itself auctioned and sold in March 2024.

== Former models list ==
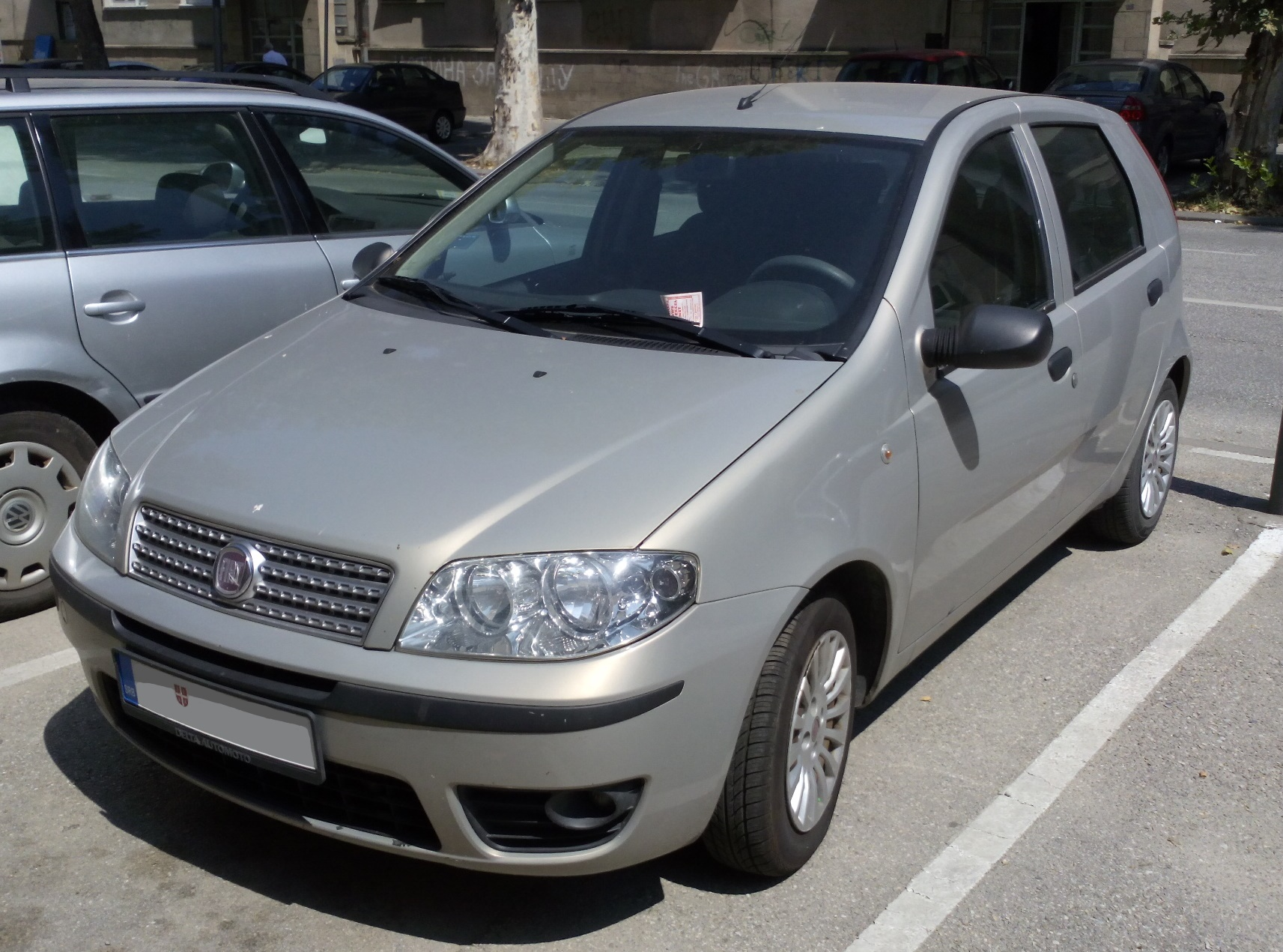
Fiat Punto Classic (2008–2011)

Vehicles produced by the Zastava factory in Kragujevac, Serbia:

- Fiat Campagnola – 1953–1962. 9,089 built without modification.
- Fiat 1400 – 1954–1961, without modification.
- Fiat 1100R – thousands produced.
- Fiat 1800 – 613 produced examples between 1960 and 1962.
- Zastava 750 (later 850), nicknamed "Fića", 1955–1985. 923,487 produced with some modification.
- Fiat 615 – medium truck produced by Zastava Kamioni from 1957–?. 36,000 built.
- Zastava 620B – medium truck crew cab produced by Zastava Kamioni from 1962–1976.
- Fiat 1300 and 1500 – 1962–1979. 201,160 without modification.
- Fiat 850 – A modified/stretched FIAT 600D passenger compact car thousands produced.
- Fiat-OM 40 – 1969–1980s A 12 t lorry based on the original 1970s OM 40 with Fiat truck engine and some with 4×4 for the army.
- Zastava Skala – Fiat 128 based with many body modifications. 1971–2008. 1,273,532 built. Many built in Egypt by Nasr.
- Zastava 128 – 1980–2003
- Zastava Koral (Yugo 45) – 1980–2008. 750,000 built. More than 150,000 Yugos exported to the USA. Global production: 794,428.
- Zastava 900AK – ??–1989.
- Fiat Daily – 1991–? Iveco owns 46% of Zastava Kamioni.
- Zastava Florida (Yugo Sana) – 1988–November 2008, 29,950 built of the second series.
- Zastava 10 (Fiat Punto II) – 2006–2008; 4,224 units built.
- Zastava Uno (Yugo Uno 45R) – 1988–1994. 2,620 Fiat Uno 1st generation.
- Fiat Punto Classic – 2008–2011, 2013; 41,000 built.

== See also ==
- Fiat Chrysler Automobiles
- Fiat
- IDA-Opel
- List of automobile manufacturers
- Zastava Special Automobiles
- Zastava Trucks
- List of companies of the Socialist Federal Republic of Yugoslavia
