= Damis Motor Poland =

Damis Motor Poland was a Polish automotive company involved in the import, assembly, and distribution of Eastern European and Asian vehicles. In 1990, the company became a distributor of Maruti Suzuki city cars manufactured in India under license from Suzuki, importing more than 6,000 vehicles within three years.

In 1995, the company shifted its focus to the Ukrainian-built ZAZ Tavria, which were assembled at the Textile Research Institute in Łódź. In June 1997, Damis Motor Poland signed an agreement for the industrial assembly of the Yugo Koral and Yugo Florida models. The Florida models assembled in Poland featured slightly different bumpers from the standard version, although the reason for this change remains unknown. Exact production figures were never published; however, only three Florida models are known to survive in Poland, two of which were assembled locally.

By 2005, the company had begun cooperating with the Romanian off-road vehicle manufacturer ARO. Vehicles assembled under this partnership were equipped with Polish-made engines and gearboxes. Damis secured contracts to supply vehicles to the police. The company’s dealership on Rzymowskiego Street in Warsaw also sold Lada vehicles for a period, before ending its cooperation with Dow-Max, the Polish distributor of the brand.
