= Faas =

Faas may refer to:

== People ==
=== Given name ===
- Faas Wilkes (1923–2006), Dutch football forward

=== Surname ===
- Ellis Faas (1962–2020), Dutch makeup artist
- Horst Faas (1933–2012), German photo-journalist and two-time Pulitzer Prize winner
- Robert Faas (1889–1966), German footballer

== Other ==
- Function as a service
- Fellow of the African Academy of Sciences
- Faas (film), a 2022 Indian Marathi-language film

== See also ==
- FAA (disambiguation)
- Fas (disambiguation)
- Servaas
