= IDA-Opel =

Serbian car manufacturer based in Kikinda

IDA-OPEL Kikinda
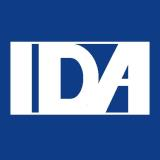
- Type: Joint venture
- Industry: Automotive
- Founded: 1977
- Defunct: 1992; 34 years ago
- Headquarters: Kikinda, FR Yugoslavia (1992)
- Area served: Southeast Europe
- Products: Automobile parts

IDA-Opel was a Yugoslav car manufacturer based in Kikinda, Serbia. It operated from 1977 until 1992.

== Name ==
The company name "IDA" is the abbreviation of "Industrija Delova Automobila" (eng. Industry of Automobile Parts) and "Opel" in its name stems from co-operation with the German automotive company Adam Opel AG (Opel).

== History ==
The original plant was established in 1908 as a workshop attached to a local brick factory.

In 1977, after eight years of successful co-operation, the iron foundry in Kikinda signed a joint venture and long-term co-operation manufacturing contract valid for a period of 15 years with Adam Opel AG (Opel). US$78.5 million were invested in the newly established IDA-Kikinda factory, funded 51% by Kikinda Iron Foundry and 49% by General Motors.

The first delivery of manufactured parts from two new factories in Kikinda (Livac and Metalac), took part in December 1979. The export of Yugoslav-made parts allowed IDA to import mostly finished Opels, about 3,000 per year in the early 1980s, and have them treated as Yugoslav products.

By exporting partly manufactured and fully manufactured parts/components for Opel vehicles, an import/export ratio of 1:1 was enabled. Up to the imposition of economic sanctions on the Federal Republic of Yugoslavia (Serbia and Montenegro) in May 1992, 38,700 Opel vehicles and large number of spare parts worth around DM 100 million were produced. During the 12 years of IDA-Opel manufacturing co-operation, over DM 1.3 billion have been made from this joint venture. The plant was later restructured as the Livnica Kikinda metal foundry, which was taken over by Slovenia's Cimos in 2004 and manufactures auto parts for various European manufacturers.

- total number of vehicles produced: 38,700
- models produced: Opel Kadett, Opel Rekord, Opel Ascona, Opel Senator, Opel Corsa, Opel Vectra and the Opel Omega

The 1983 model year and onwards Opel Senator was sold in the Yugoslav market sold under the name "Opel Kikinda."

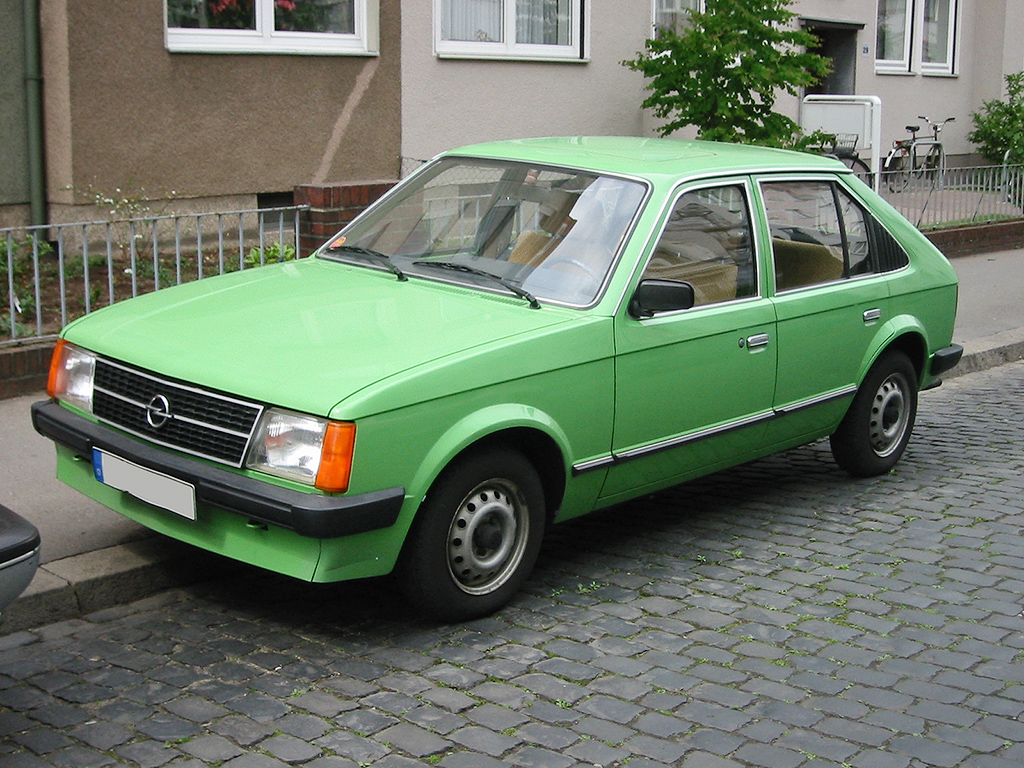
Opel Kadett D

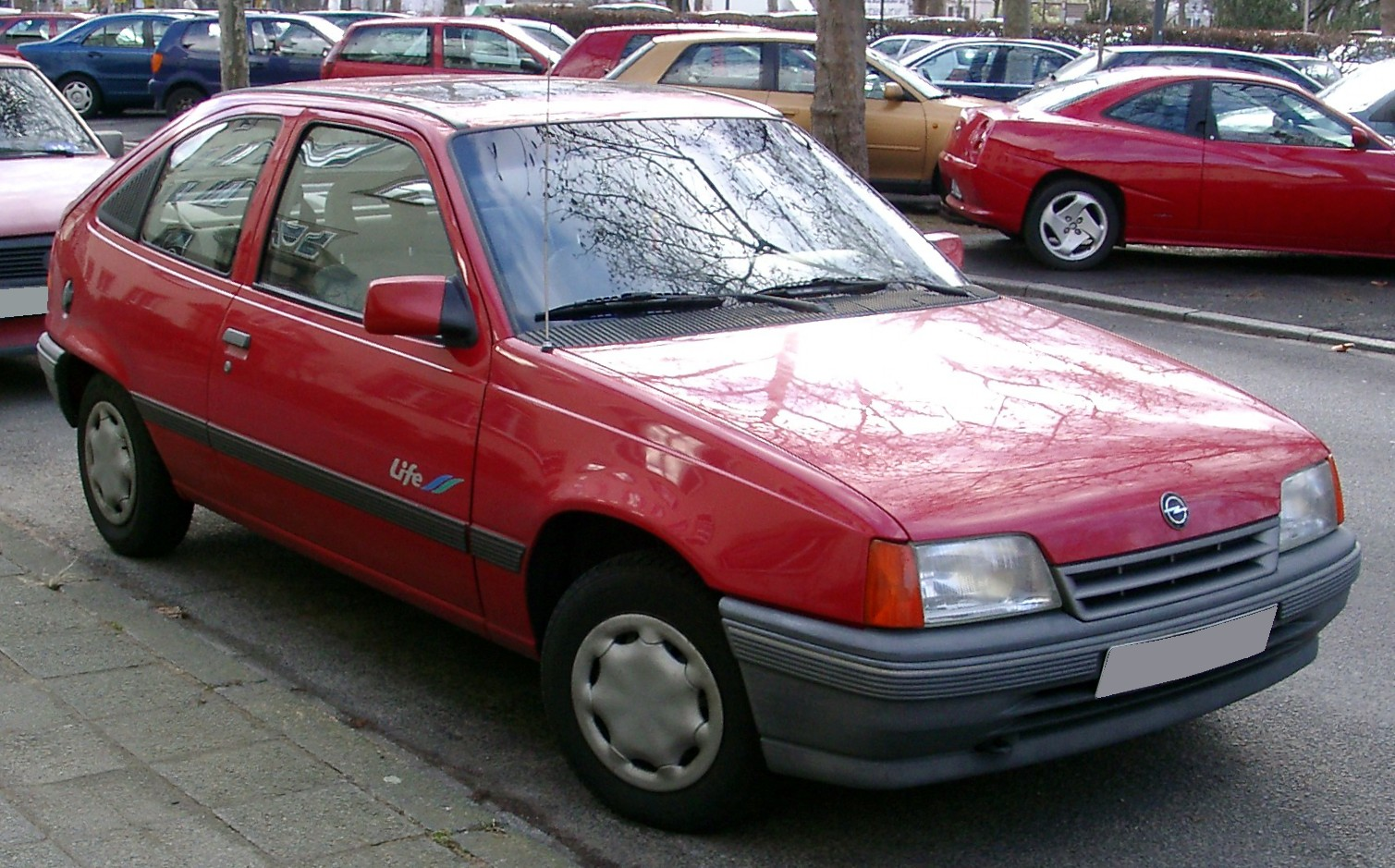
Opel Kadett E

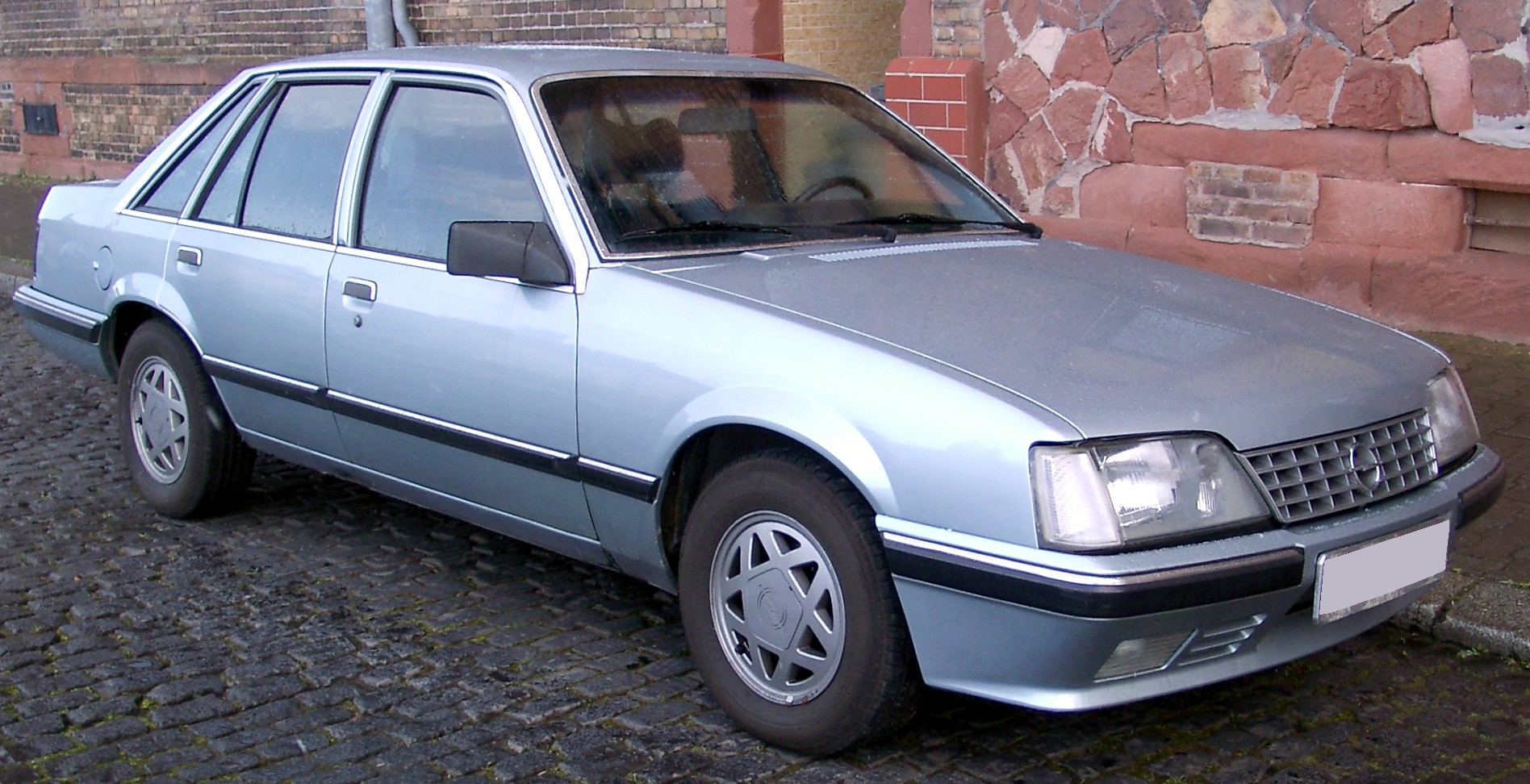
Opel Kikinda (Opel Senator in mainland Europe)

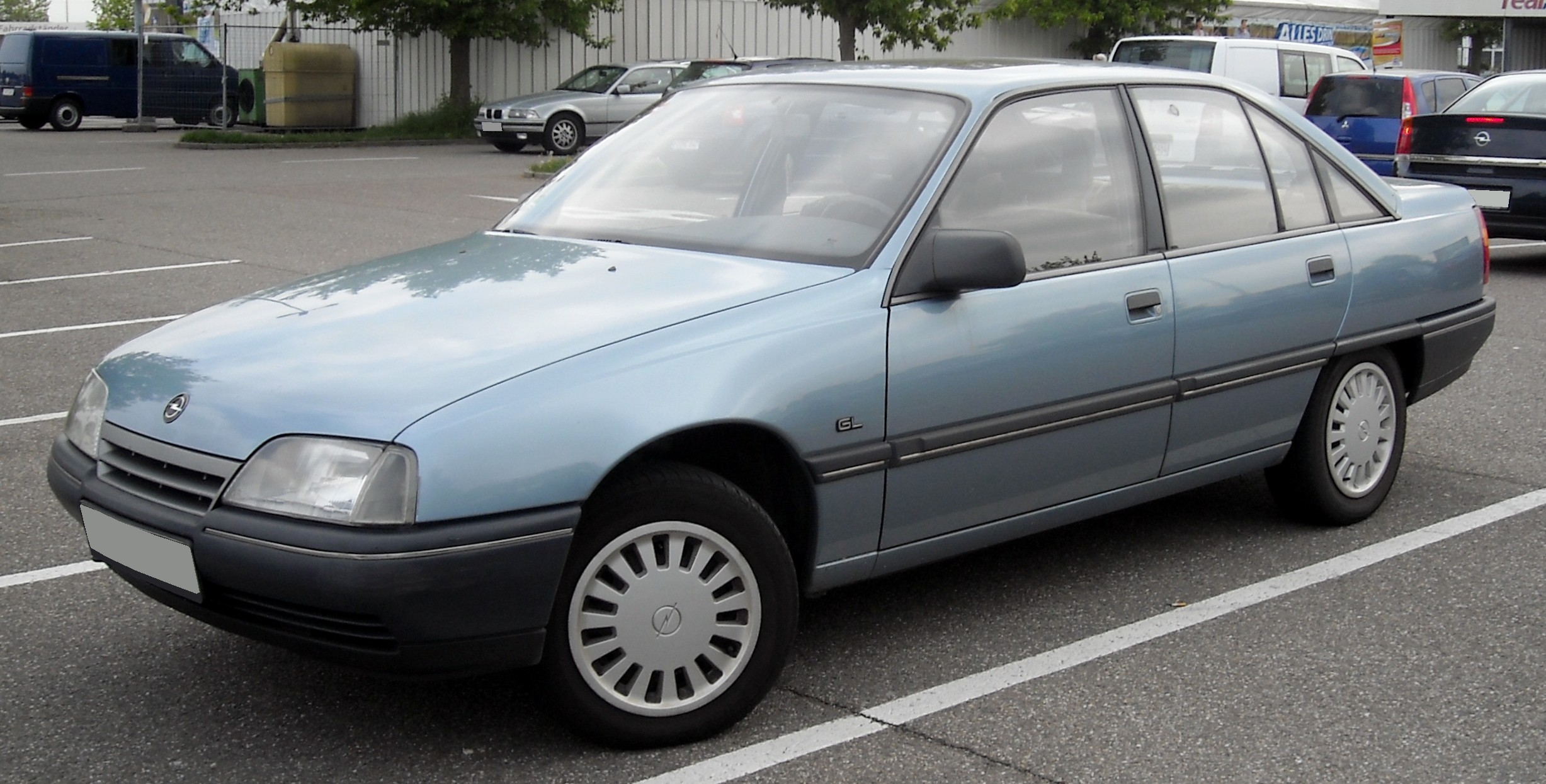
Opel Omega A

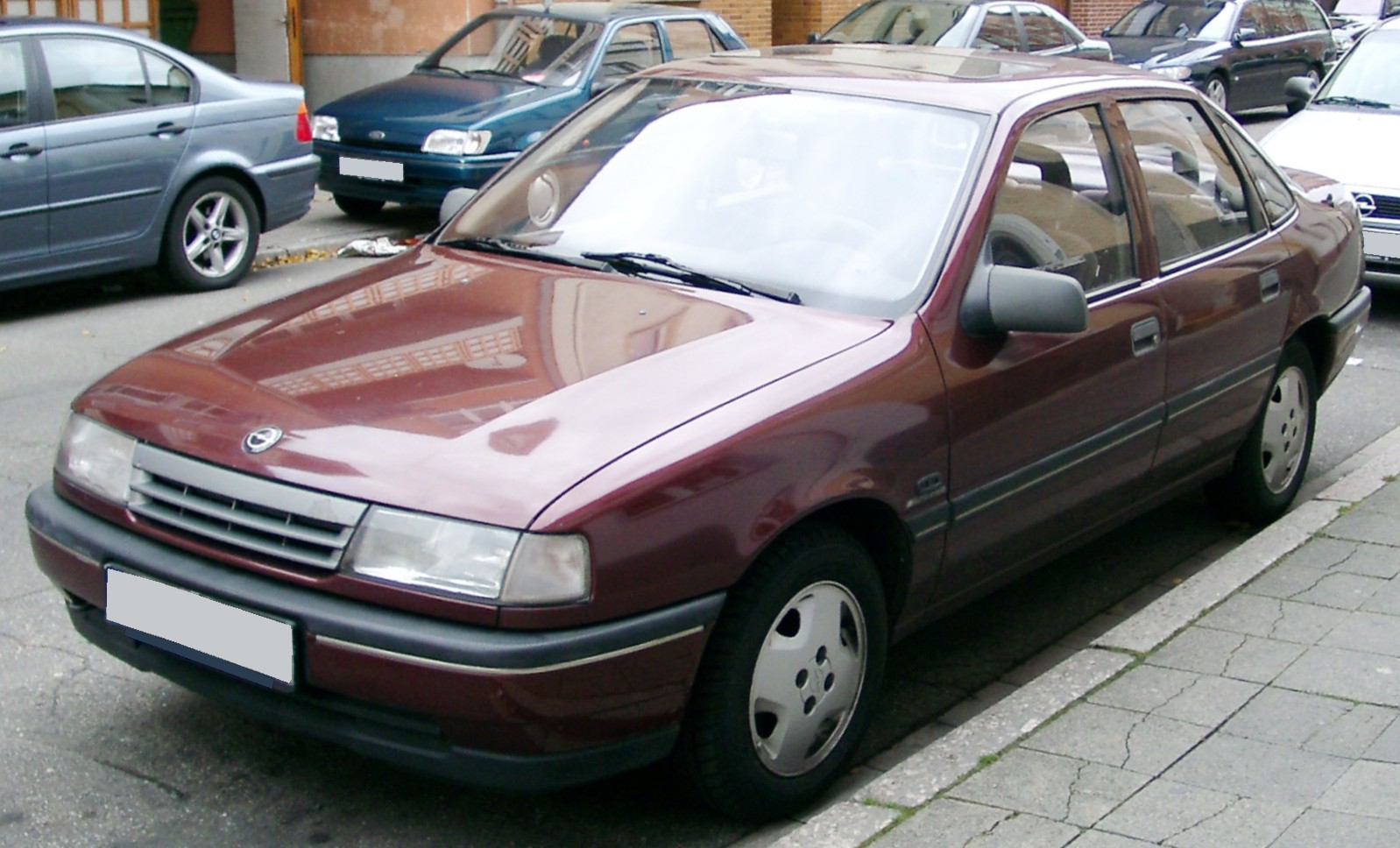
Opel Vectra A

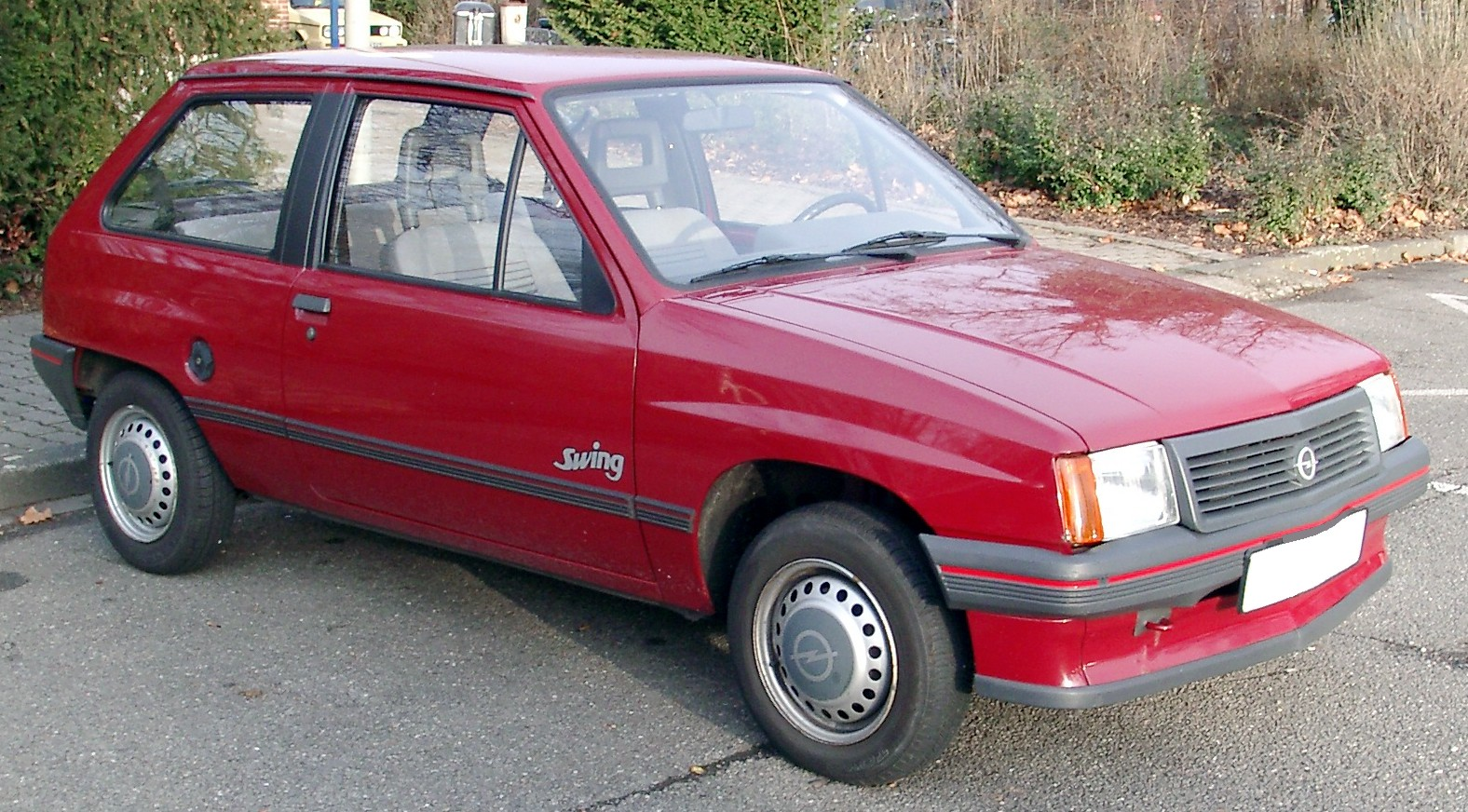
Opel Corsa A

== See also ==
- Zastava special cars
- Fiat Automobili Srbija
- Opel
- List of companies of the Socialist Federal Republic of Yugoslavia
