= FAA (disambiguation) =

The Federal Aviation Administration is an agency of the United States federal government.

FAA may also refer to:

== People ==
- Faa, surname or epithet of the family of the King of the Gypsies in Scotland
- Faà di Bruno, an Italian noble family based in the areas of Asti, Casale
- Fakhruddin Ali Ahmed, (1905–1977), former president of India
- Félix Auger-Aliassime, Canadian tennis player

== Organizations ==
- Federación Agraria Argentina, an Argentine agrarian workers' trade union
- Federació Andorrana d'Atletisme, the governing body for the sport of athletics in Andorra
- Federação Angolana de Atletismo, the governing body for the sport of athletics in Angola
- Feildians Athletic Association, an athletic club based in St. John's, Canada
- Finska Ångfartygs Aktiebolag (FÅA), Swedish name of the Finland Steamship Company
- Fleet Air Arm, aviation component of the United Kingdom's Royal Navy
- Fleet Air Arm (RAN), the Fleet Air Arm of the Royal Australian Navy
- Food Addicts Anonymous, a twelve-step program for people with food addictions
- Forças Armadas de Angola, Angolan Armed Forces
- Foundation for Aboriginal Affairs, an organisation for Indigenous Australians, 1964–1977
- Fuerza Aérea Argentina, the Argentine Air Force

== Science and Technology ==
- Fatty acid amide, a family of biochemicals
- Fellow of the Australian Academy of Science
- Fetch-and-add, a special CPU instruction
- Formalin-acetic acid-alcohol, a solution used in fixing tissue samples

== Other uses ==
- FAA 81 (Spanish: Fusil Automático Argentino, "Argentine Automatic Rifle"), also known as FARA 83
- Faranah Airport, Guinea (by IATA code)
- Federal Arbitration Act, a United States legal statute
- Félix Auger-Aliassime, professional tennis player
- FISA Amendments Act

== See also ==
- Faas (disambiguation)
- Faaa, a commune in the suburbs of Papeete in French Polynesia
