= Zastava Special Automobiles =

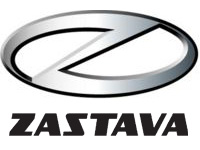
- Native name: Застава специјални аутомобили
- Romanized name: Zastava Specijalni Automobili
- Company type: LLC
- Industry: Automotive
- Founded: 12 March 1991; 35 years ago (Current form); Founded in 1970
- Defunct: 2017
- Fate: Bankruptcy procedure
- Headquarters: Konjovićeva 86, Sombor, Serbia
- Area served: Worldwide
- Parent: Group Zastava Vehicles
- Website: www.zastavasa.co.rs

Zastava Special Automobiles (Serbian: Застава Специјални Аутомобили, romanized: Zastava Specijalni Automobili) was a Serbian and Yugoslav special automobile factory with headquarters in Sombor, Serbia. It was a subsidiary of Group Zastava Vehicles from Kragujevac, which declared bankruptcy in May 2017. Zastava Special Automobiles previously declared bankruptcy in August 2016, after decades of insolvency.

== History ==
Foundation

The first steps in the development of automobile industry of Vojvodina and Sombor started by investing in the old product line of 17 million dinars. It was built in 1970 and with 170 employees started production that had two types of delivery vehicles, each having a capacity of 600 pounds, in cooperation with "Crvena zastava". On the basis of the constitution, the collective then becomes one of the 35 OOUR's of the Institute "Crvena zastava".

It had a relatively short time of existence, succeeded in 70% of the vehicles it produced in cooperation with subcontractors throughout Yugoslavia. Expressed numerically, it was about 15,000 vehicles, placed on domestic and foreign markets. Then it counted to about 400 employees.

Seven new types of commercial vehicles were produced, including the then 'new luxury vehicle' 430 - {K} - called Luxe kombi van, and it also established a cooperation with a number of subcontractors such as "21 May" from Belgrade, 'Tiger' from Pirot, 'Iskra' from Kranj and others.

1970s–1990s

The Zastava branch "Sombor", following a referendum held by the workers, was merged on 23 June 1971, with the trading company "Autobačka" from Sombor and the Institutes "Crvena zastava" from Kragujevac. At that time it was operated as part of the Institute OUR "Crvena zastava" by the decision of the workers in July 1973. The branch "Sombor" became one of the 35 basic organizations of associated labor within "Crvena zastava".

The beginning of this branch ould best be seen by observing activities of the trading company "Autobačka" which was established in 1958 and employed a dozen workers were engaged in selling all kinds of industrial metal products. Sombor branch employed 140 employees in business oriented for sale exclusively for Zastava vehicles. During their first year, in 1971, they sold 2,407 vehicles; in 1972 sold 3,257 vehicles, while in 1974 sold 7,000 vehicles. Spare parts sale also increased.

The sales department was made up of two warehouses, sales of spare parts and weapons in Odžaci and Senta. Before the break-up of Yugoslavia there was a warehouse in Vukovar, Croatia, which dealt exclusively with trade while the working unit was located in Kula, Serbia, established in early 1974, which engaged in the sale of vehicles, spare parts and servicing of vehicles.

1990-s–2010s

Zastava Special Automobiles from Sombor, operated as a subsidiary of the Group Zastava Vehicles Kragujevac. It produced multi-purpose special vehicles and spare parts for vehicles as well as providing production services in the field of processing of steel by deformation, a cutting, thermal processing, coating and manufacturing of polyester parts. For the consistent implementation of quality systems in all cycles of development, production, sales and after sales of products the company had received a certificate JUS ISO 9001: 2001.Osnovni HEA program makes producing sales of multi-purpose vehicle based on passenger car factory car Kragujevac. Annual capacity of the company was 10,000 vehicles.

Shutdown and bankruptcy

In August 2016, Zastava Special Automobiles declared bankruptcy after decade of poor financial results and insolvency.

In May 2017, Group Zastava Vehicles, consisted of Zastava Automobiles, Zastava Trucks, Zastava INPRO and Zastava Special Automobiles, declared bankruptcy before the Economic Court in Kragujevac.

== Products ==
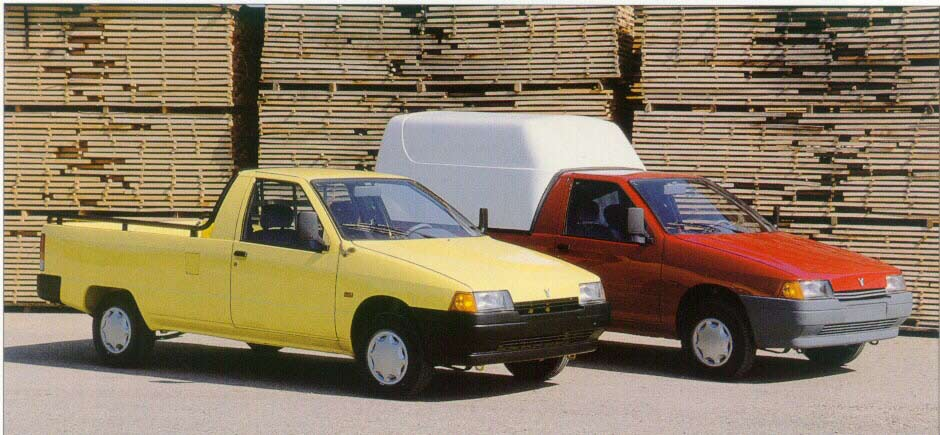
Zastava Florida Pick-UP

Zastava Special Automobiles produced various specifications of the Pick-up versions of the Zastava Skala 55 (Zastava 101) and Zastava Florida.

Borth were marketed as the "Zastava Poly", with the 101-based ones being branded as "Poly 1.1" and the Florida based ones as the "Florida Poly".

Scale 1.1 Pick-Up

Scale Poly Van 1.1

1.1 Poly Baker Scale

Scale 1.1 Poly JV

and vehicles Florida Pick-Up (the model) that the body produced significant changes from the basic passenger car model Yugo Florida. In its models

Van,

== See also ==
- Zastava Automobiles
- Zastava Trucks
