= Fass =

Fass (German: barrel, vat) may refer to:

- Fass 57 (SIG 510), a battle rifle
- FASS 90 (SIG 550), an assault rifle

Fass or Faß is a surname. Notable people with the surname include:

- John Fass, American graphic designer
- Baddon Fass, a fictional character in Dark Empire and Dark Empire II
- Bob Fass (1933–2021), American radio personality
- Frederick Fass (1853–1930), American baseball player
- George Fass and Gertrude Fass, see 77 Sunset Strip
- Myron Fass, 1970s magazine entrepreneur
- Patricia Fass Palmer, producer of The Powers That Be

FASS may also refer to:

- FASS curve, a curve in mathematical analysis which is space-filling, self-avoiding, simple and self-similar
- FASS (drug formulary), Farmaceutiska Specialiteter i Sverige, the Swedish national formulary of drugs
- Friends of Assam and Seven Sisters, an international non-profit NGO - see Assamese Associations
- FASS, a University of Waterloo theater group

== See also ==
- Fas (disambiguation)
- Heidelberg Tun (Großes Fass von Heidelberg)
