= Faz =

Faz or FAZ may refer to:

== People ==
- Fahrudin Kuduzović (born 1984), Bosnian footballer
- Faz Husain (1952–2006), American politician
- Owen Farrell (born 1991), English rugby union player
- Feliks Zemdegs (born 1995), Australian speedcuber
- Irving Fazola (1912–1949), American jazz clarinetist
- Roberto Faz (1914–1966), Cuban singer

== Other uses ==
- Faz, Iran, a village in Razavi Khorasan Province
- Fasa Airport, in Iran
- Fazakerley railway station, in England
- Football Association of Zambia
- Frankfurter Allgemeine Zeitung, a German newspaper
- Northwestern Fars language, of Iran, probably misclassified
- Zairian Armed Forces (French: Forces Armées Zaïroises), the former regular army of Zaire
