= Zastava 10 =

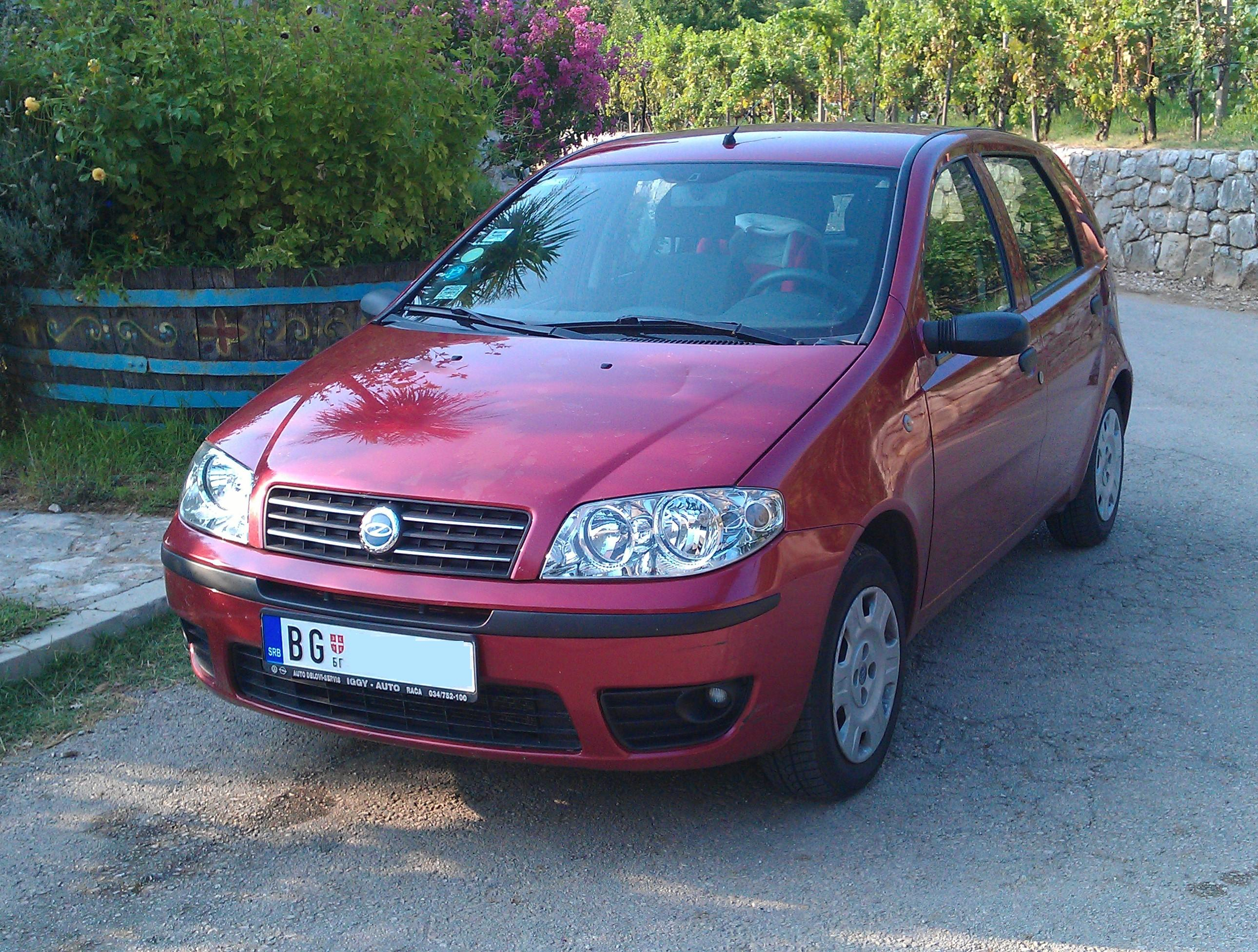
- 2008 Zastava 10

Overview
- Manufacturer: Zastava
- Production: 2006–2008
- Assembly: Serbia: Kragujevac

Body and chassis
- Class: Subcompact (B)
- Body style: 5-door hatchback
- Platform: Fiat B
- Related: Fiat Punto (188)

Powertrain
- Engine: 1.2 L I4 (petrol)
- Transmission: 5-speed manual

Chronology
- Successor: Fiat Punto (2nd generation)

The Zastava 10 is a subcompact car that was produced by Zastava between 2006 and 2008. Essentially a rebadged Fiat Punto under licence, the car was the last vehicle to be introduced by the company before it was acquired by Fiat.

== Design ==
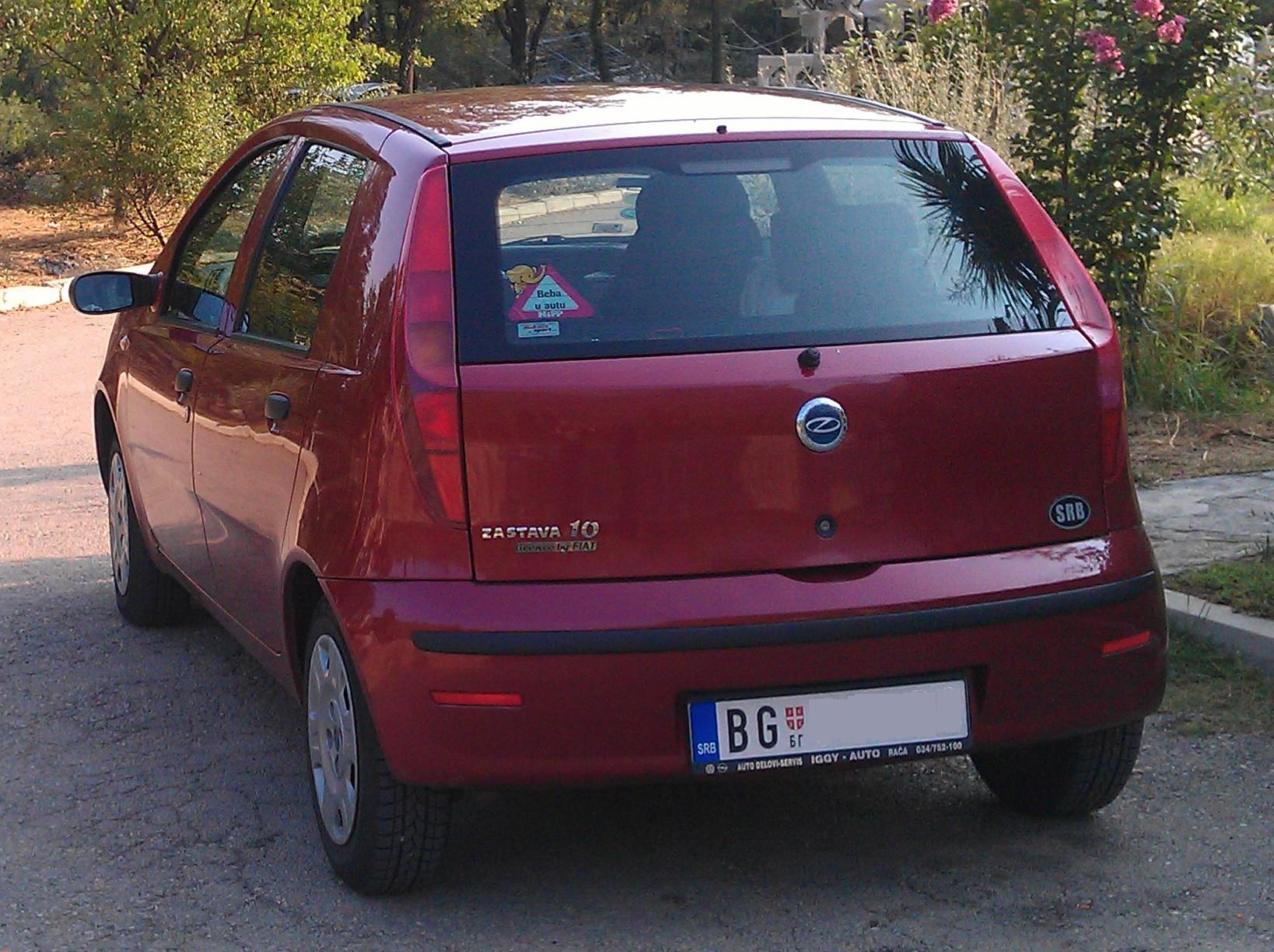
Rear view

The car was presented at the 2006 Belgrade Motor Show. The car was nearly identical to the facelifted Punto, with the only noticeable difference being the Zastava badges instead of Fiat ones. The only improvements to the Zastava 10 in relation to the Fiat Punto was that the engine reached Euro 4 standards, and there was a more modernised colour palette, similar to the Fiat Grande Punto.

== Equipment ==
The Zastava 10 only came with a 1.2 litre 8 valve petrol engine producing 60 horsepower at 5000 rpm, paired with a 5-speed manual, both found on the Punto. The engine was able to propel the car to a top speed of 155 km/h and do 0-100 km/h in approximately 14.3 seconds. There were a choice of 5 trim levels on the car: Standard, Standard+, Comfort, Dynamic and Impressionante. Standard equipment in the car included power steering, driver airbags and 14" steel wheels with hubcaps. The top range Impressionante trim included air conditioning, anti-lock brakes, passenger airbags and electric windows. Prices of the Zastava 10 started at around 7,920 euros with the Impressionante trim costing 9,325 euros.

== Sales ==
Zastava sold the 10 only in the Serbian domestic market. Sales of the Zastava 10 amounted to over 10 percent of the market share in Serbia. However, sales were slow, and by the time Zastava had gone bankrupt in 2008, only 4,224 examples had been built and sold. After Fiat took over production, the Zastava 10 was discontinued, and the Fiat Punto Classic began production at the factory.
