= Yugo Florida =

Five-door hatchback

Zastava Florida
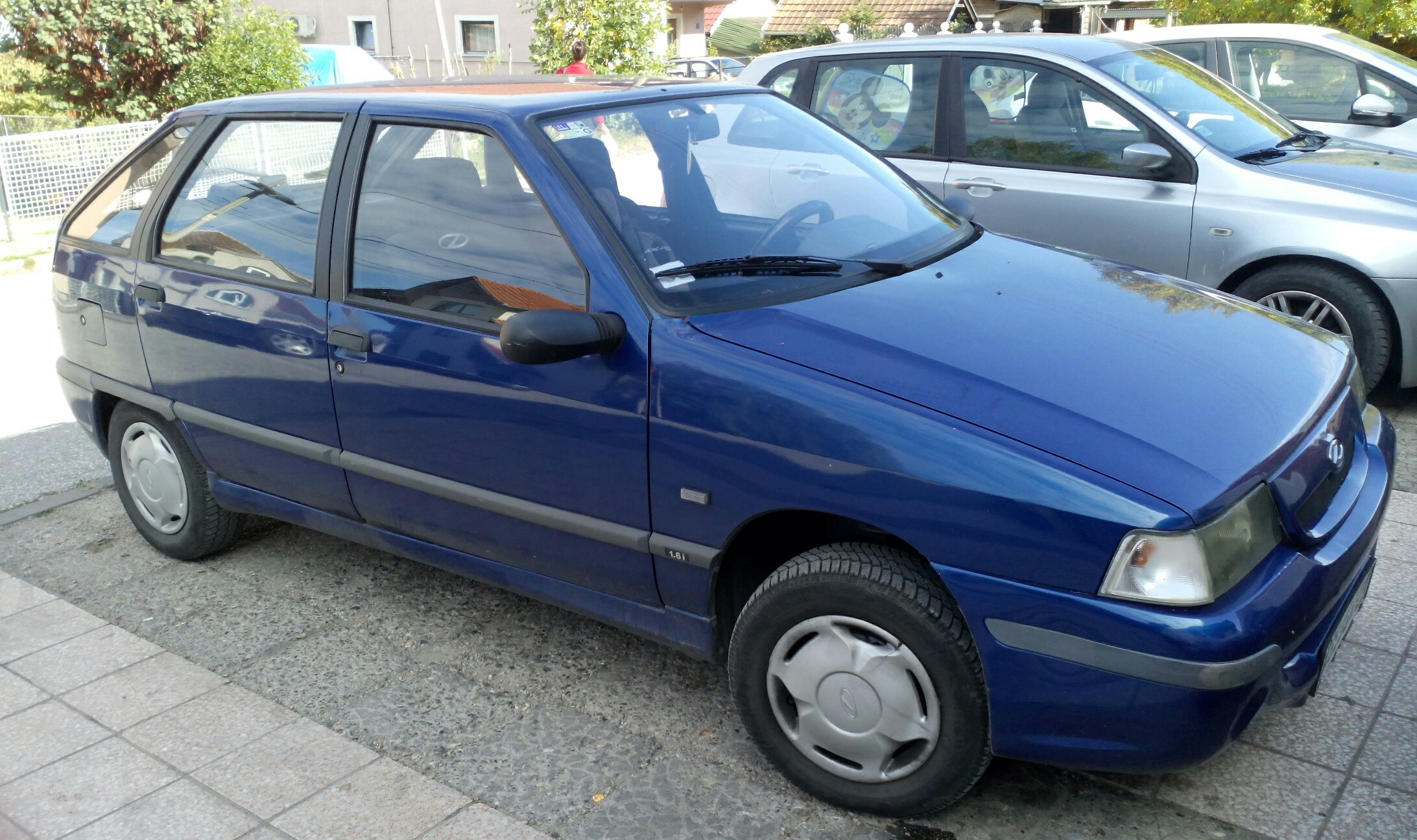
- Zastava Florida

Overview
- Manufacturer: Zastava
- Also called: Nasr Florida 1400; Yugo Sana (United Kingdom); Zastava 103
- Production: February 1987 – November 2008; 29,950 units produced
- Assembly: Yugoslavia / Serbia: Kragujevac; Egypt: Cairo (Nasr)
- Designer: Giorgetto Giugiaro at Italdesign

Body and chassis
- Class: Small family car
- Body style: 5-door hatchback 2-door pick-up 2-door pick-up/van (Poly)

Powertrain
- Engine: 1116 cc I4; 1124 cc PSA TU1 I4; 1298 cc I4; 1372 cc I4; 1581 cc I4; 1587 cc PSA TU5 I4
- Transmission: 5-speed manual

The Yugo Florida, also known as Zastava Florida, Yugo Sana or Yugo Miami, is a five-door hatchback which was introduced by Yugoslav automaker Zastava on 19 February 1987, and remained in production until 2008. The Florida was designed by Giorgetto Giugiaro, and one group of engineers of Zastava at Italdesign. It has design similarities to Giugiaro's highly influential Fiat Uno supermini design, and also his design for the Mk1 SEAT Ibiza. Detail style is similar to his Renault 21 design.

The Florida was the most advanced and independently engineered automobile produced by Zastava before it stopped producing civilian automobiles in 2008.

It was sold in the United Kingdom from 1988 to 1992, badged as the Yugo Sana and available with a 1400 cc litre petrol engine and also with a 1700 cc diesel, both shared with the Fiat Tipo and supplied under licence from Fiat. It was eventually withdrawn from sale, due to its distributor, Zastava Cars (GB) Ltd of Reading going out of business as a consequence of the Yugoslav Wars and economic sanctions.

In 2001, many years after its debut in Europe, the Nasr badged Florida entered production in Helwan District in Cairo, Egypt by Nasr. Nasr's Florida is almost exactly the same as Zastava's Florida, except with a modified grille.

== Background ==
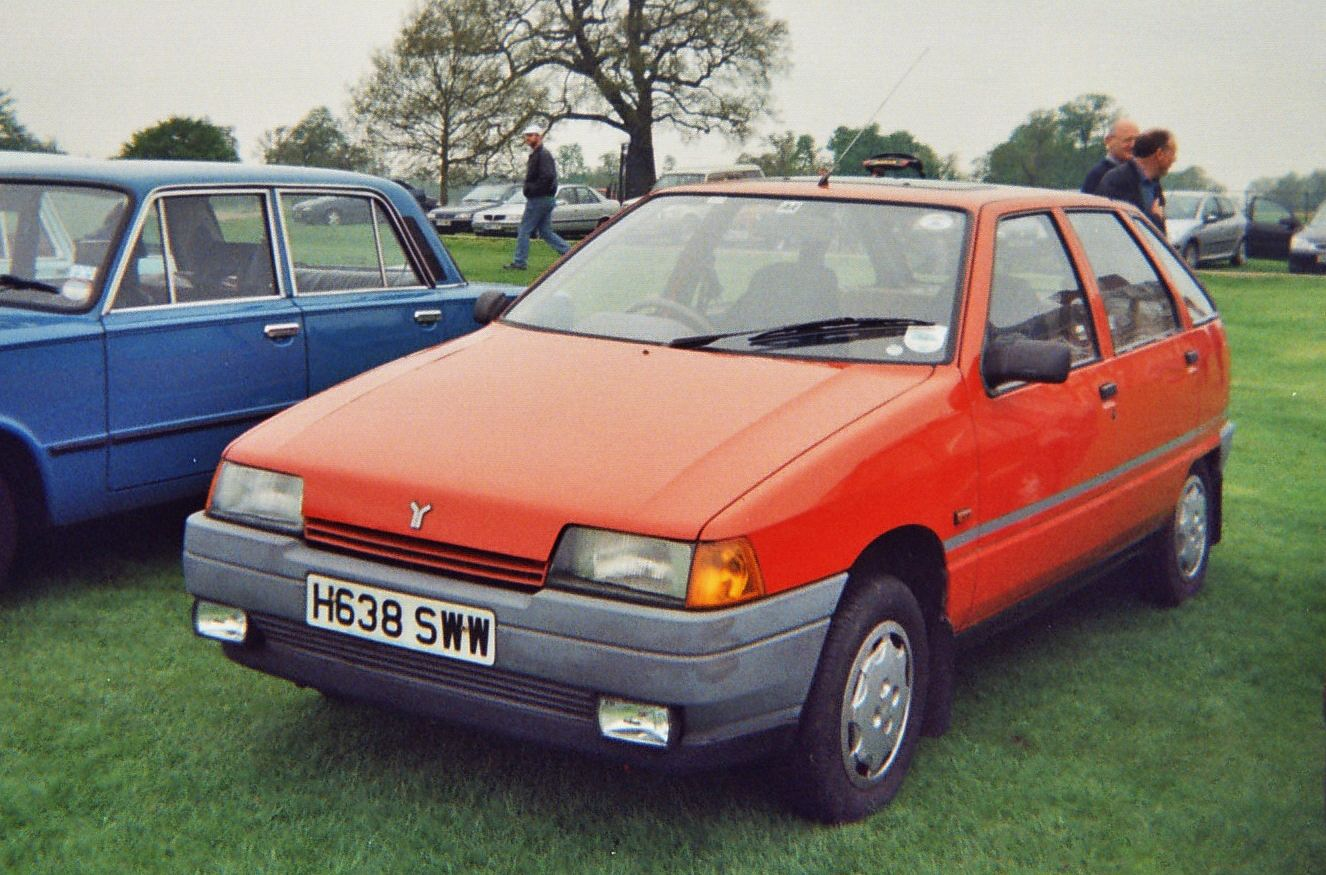
1990 Yugo Sana

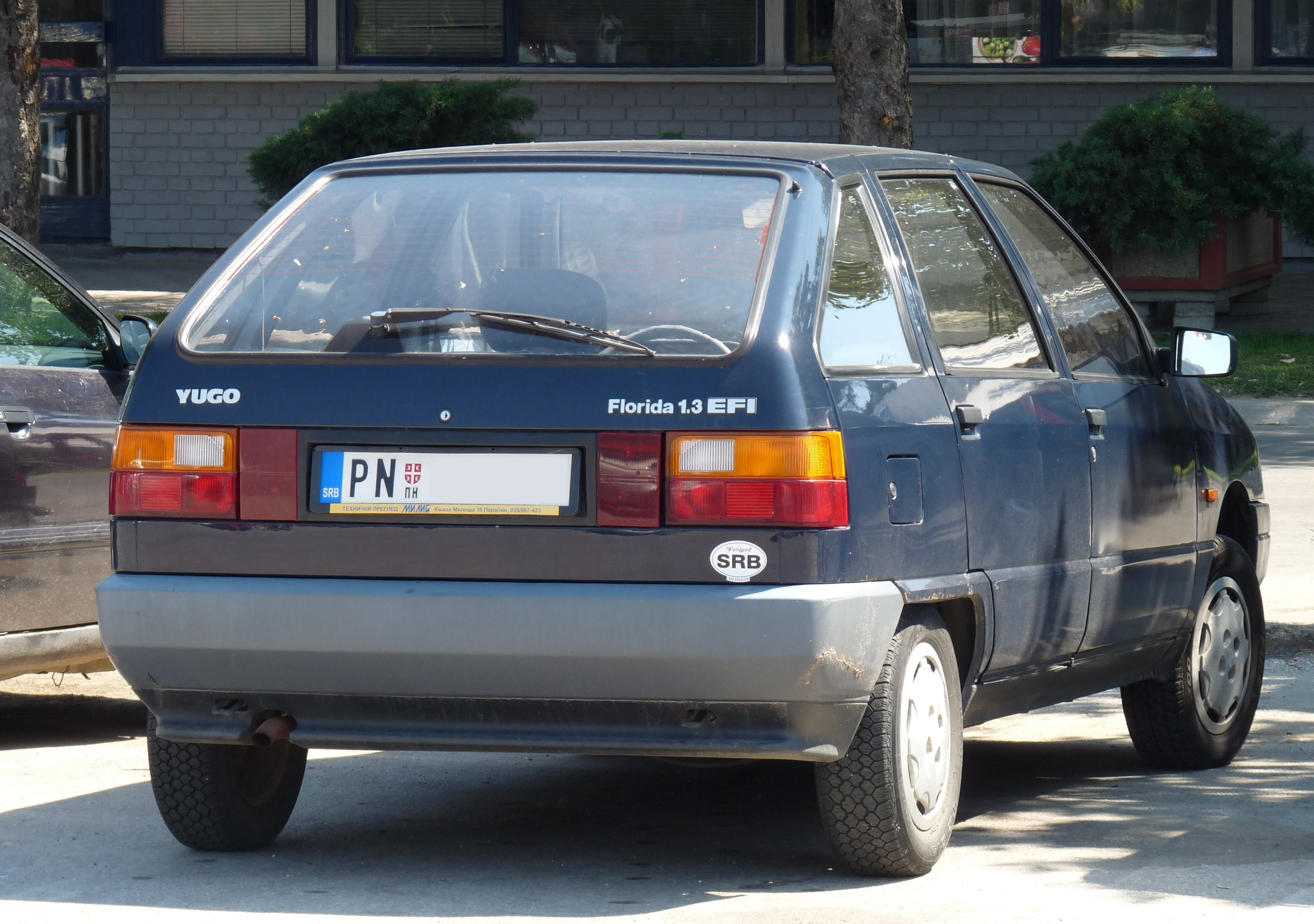
Yugo Florida 1.3 EFI (rear)

The Zastava Florida was developed as the Zastava 103, and officially went on sale on 2 October 1988. The model was given the name "Florida" in order to celebrate the success of the Yugo in the United States. During its lifetime the Florida faced competition from the Romanian built Renault based Dacia Solenza and its successor Dacia Logan, and the Russian Lada 112, in the value for money compact family hatchback market.

Its main advantages were its versatility, its high technology compared to other Zastavas, and its price, never exceeding the EUR 7,000 figure for top of the range models. In 2000 a refreshed model of the Zastava Florida was revealed, originally called the Florida 103FL.

At the 2001 Belgrade Auto Show, it was shown with an "In" trim name added, so as to be called the "Zastava Florida In", and this is how it was marketed since. The Florida In L was the top-of-the-line trim, and offered air conditioning and radio. The price range was between EUR 5,000 and 7,000.

It was Zastava's most expensive car, before the introduction of the Zastava 10 at the 2006 Belgrade Motor Show. It was also available in flat bed pick up, panel van and ambulance format. After Zastava's brief fallout with Fiat, 1.1 and 1.6 litre Peugeot TU Series engines were installed, beginning in September 2002.

Zastava announced a diesel engined Florida in January 2007, which was a model which had been promised since before the original introduction, using Peugeot's 68 PS (50 kW) 1.4 litre HDi engine. In the end, only 18 of these cars were built. In November 2008, the last Zastava Florida was produced in the factory in Kragujevac.

== Gallery ==
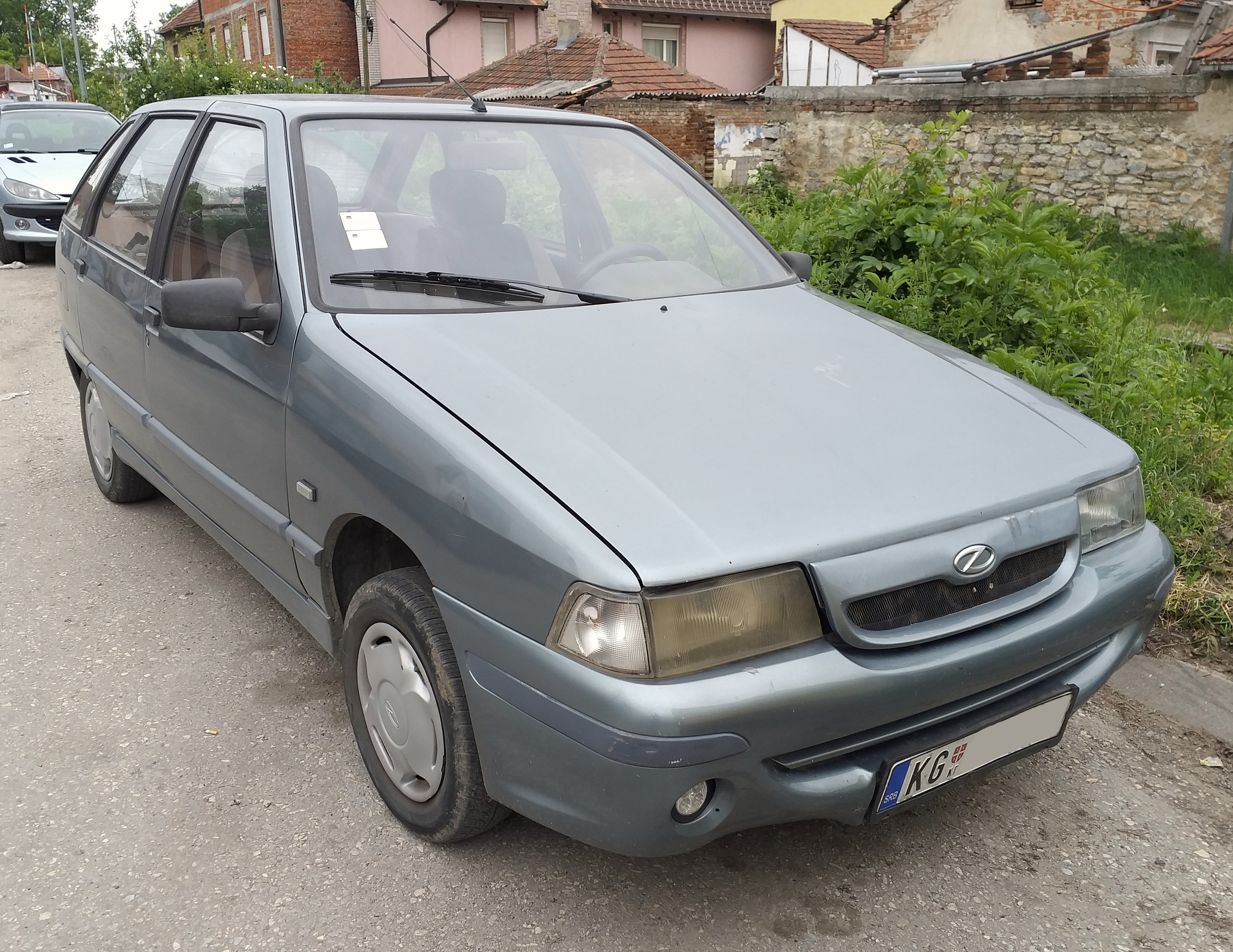
Zastava Florida (post facelift)

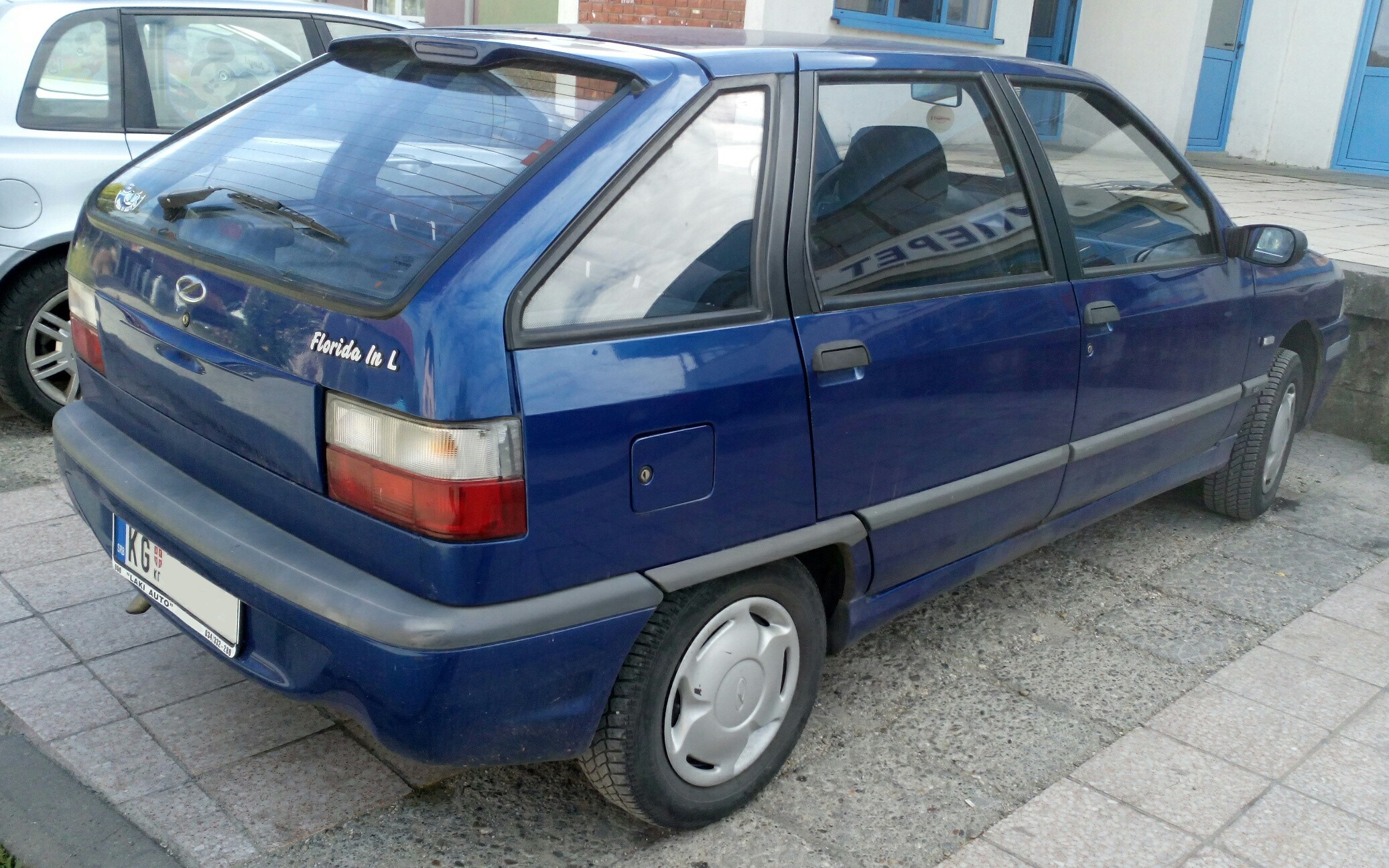
Zastava Florida Rear (post facelift)

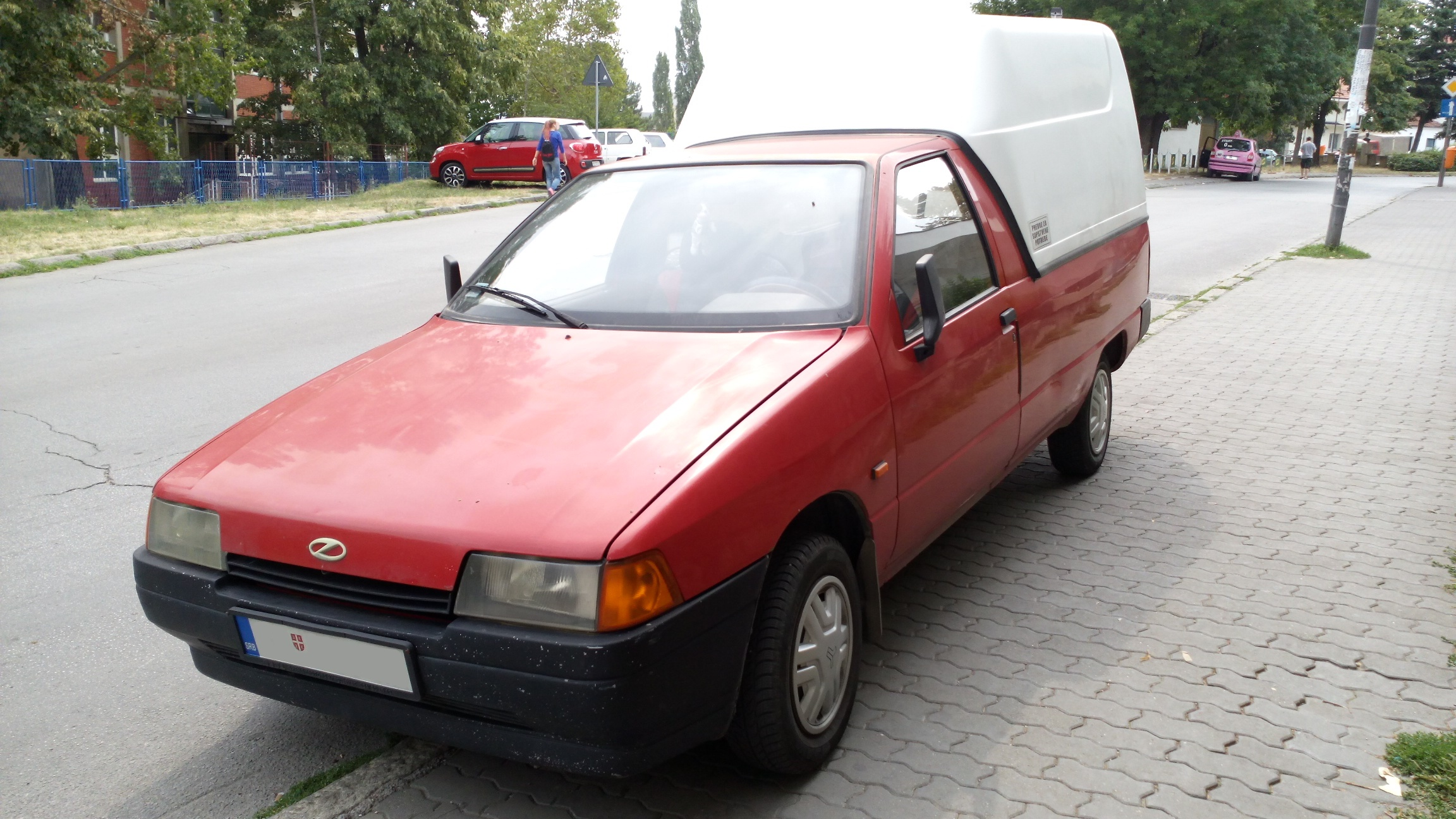
Zastava Florida (pick up)

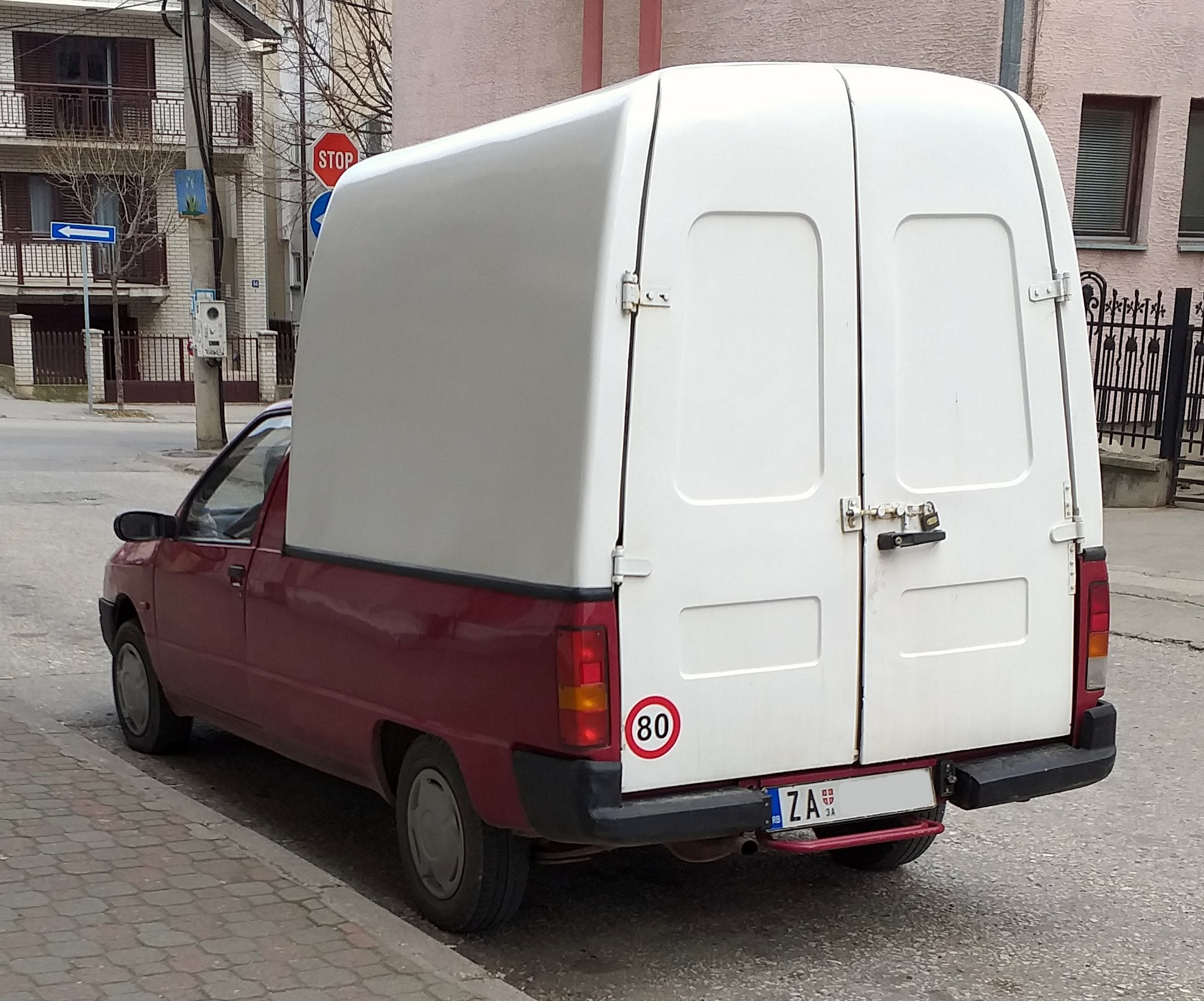
Zastava Florida Pick Up (rear)
