= Faz Husain =

American politician

Faizi Faz Husain
- फैज़ान हुसैन
- Born: January 21, 1952; Patna, Bihar, India
- Died: March 9, 2006 (aged 54); Ypsilanti, Michigan, USA
- Other names: Faz Uncle, Faz
- Occupations: restaurateur, city councilman
- Spouse: Nikki Husain

Faizi Faz Husain (Hindi: फैज़ान हुसैन) (January 21, 1952 – March 9, 2006) was a pizza shop owner, Muslim community leader, and local politician in the Ann Arbor-Ypsilanti area of Michigan.

== Biography ==
Husain was born and raised in Patna, Bihar, India, where his grandfather, Mr. Tajamul Husain, was curator at the Patna Museum. At age 14, he immigrated to the United States and settled in Ypsilanti, Michigan, where his father had gotten a job at Eastern Michigan University. Husain was married to his wife Nikat in an arranged marriage. After he had established himself in Ypsilanti, he arranged to have Nikat join him there. In an effort for himself and his family to be Americanized, Husain started calling his wife "Nikki." She became an American citizen in 1981.

External image
- Nikki Husain Becomes U.S. Citizen In Court Ceremony, October 1981

He opened a pizza shop, "Hello Faz Pizza," first in Ypsilanti, and later on West Liberty Street in nearby Ann Arbor. As a devout and practicing Muslim, Husain put the letters "INOG," for "In Name Of God," at the top of his print advertising for his pizza shop. In his Ypsilanti pizza shop, Husain created a calzone-like dish he named "faz," after himself. He provided employment not only to his relatives, but also to community members, the homeless, and other young people in the community, who worked in his kitchen and delivered pizzas and fazes.

Husain maintained a public presence; the walls of his shop displayed a selection from thousands of photographs of himself with people in show business, sports, and politics.

== Political career ==
In 1979, Husain was elected to the Ypsilanti City Council. He was the first Muslim and the first native of India to win elected office in Michigan, and one of the first in the nation. Husain paid Dominic Pallazola, one of his Ypsilanti pizza shop workers who happened also to be knowledgeable about politics, to be his campaign manager in the City Council race. Pallazola wrote Husain's campaign literature and coached him in campaigning.

As the campaign began, there was concern about the possibility of an anti-Muslim backlash among the city's voters, particularly because of the radical Islamic movement that had taken control in Iran and taken Americans hostage. As a result, in his campaign literature Husain insisted that the letters "usa" in his name be capitalized, i.e., "HUSAin," in order to emphasize his pride in being an American. After his election to Ypsilanti City Council, he served as a bridge between the progressive members of the political community with support from Eastern Michigan University students, and the more traditional conservative members of the community at large.

Husain was a candidate for mayor in 1993, though he was not elected. He served as a delegate to the Democratic National Convention in 1984. In 2000, he traveled to India with President Bill Clinton on a trade mission.

== Philanthropy ==
Husain was known in the region for financially donating to and supporting local athletics, community organizations, and student groups, including local recreational basketball teams and the Muslim Student Association at the University of Michigan.

== Death ==
Husain died of pulmonary fibrosis at age 54, and is buried in Highland Cemetery in Ypsilanti.
