= Robert Faas =

German footballer

Personal information
- Date of birth: 3 April 1889
- Date of death: 9 January 1966 (aged 76)
- Position: Goalkeeper

Senior career*
| Years | Team | Apps | (Gls) |
- 1. FC Pforzheim

International career
| 1910 | Germany | 1 | (0) |
- * Club domestic league appearances and goals

Robert Faas (3 April 1889 – 9 January 1966) was a German international footballer.
