= Fiat Serbia =

Serbian automobile manufacturing company

Coordinates: 43°59′59.56″N 20°54′7.43″E

FCA Serbia
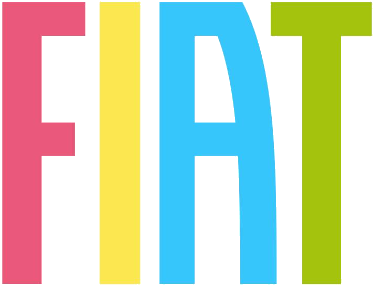

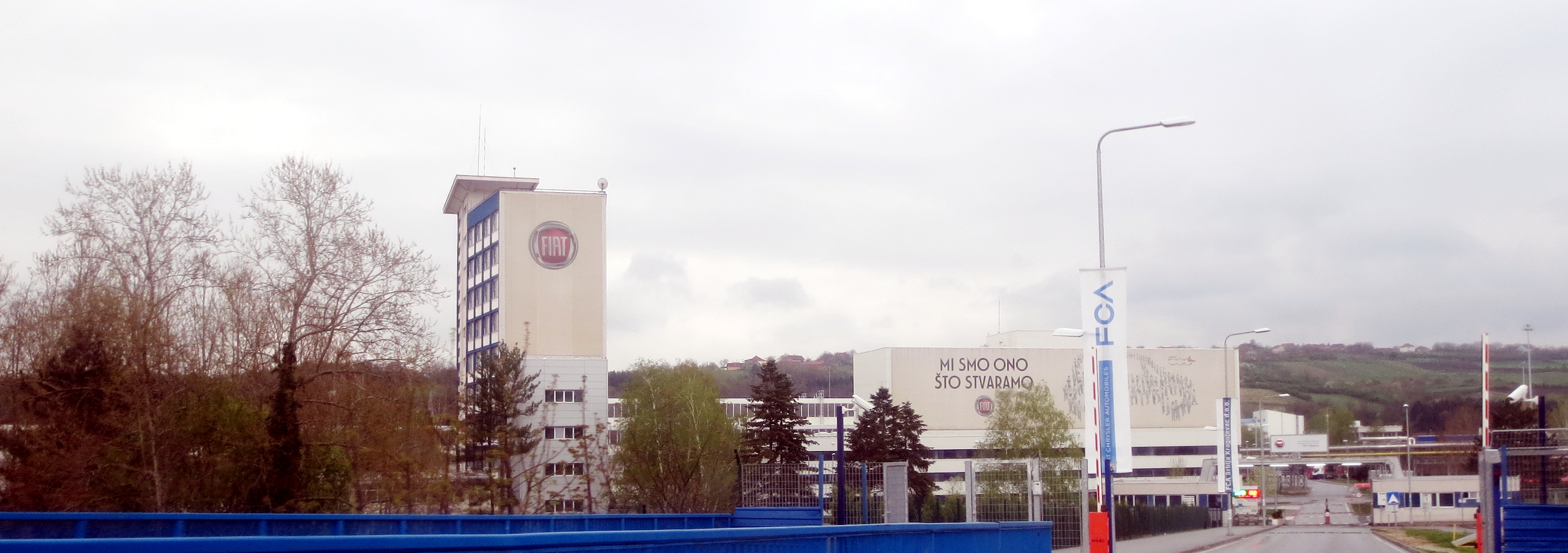
- Fiat Serbia plant in Kragujevac
- Formerly: FIAT Automobiles Serbia
- Type: Joint venture
- Industry: Automotive
- Predecessor: Former site of Zastava Automobiles (1953–2008)
- Founded: 14 October 2008; 17 years ago (Founded)
- Headquarters: Kragujevac, Serbia
- Key people: Silvia Vernetti (CEO)
- Products: Fiat 500L Fiat Grande Panda Citroën C3
- Production output: 459,975 units (2008–2018)
- Revenue: ▲ din. 15.34 billion €130.9 million
- Net income: ▼ din. 365.6 million €3.12 million (2024)
- Total assets: ▼ din. 17.15 billion €146.4 million (2024)
- Total equity: ▲ din. 23 billion €196 million (2024)
- Owner: Stellantis Europe (67%); Government of Serbia (33%)
- Number of employees: 955 (2024)
- Subsidiaries: Slobodna Zona FAS d.o.o.
- Website: fiat.rs
- Footnotes; Business ID: 20468122; Tax ID: 105808309

External images
- FIAT Headquarters Building
- FIAT Site Plan
- FIAT Assembly line
- FIAT Assembly line
- FIAT Assembly line
- FIAT Sculpture, Kragujevac

FCA Serbia (Serbian: ФКА Србија, romanized: FKA Srbija), formerly FIAT Automobiles Serbia (Note: Serbian: ФИАТ Аутомобипи Србија, romanized: FIAT Automobili Srbija.) (FAS) from 2008 to 2014, is a Serbian automotive manufacturing company based in Kragujevac, Serbia. It is a joint venture (JV) between Stellantis, which owns 67% of the operation, and the Government of Serbia, which owns the remainder.

The company headquarters and assembly plant are located on the former site of Zastava Automobiles (1953–2008) – 70 miles south of Belgrade on the Lepenica river in the country's central Šumadija region. Heavily damaged during the NATO bombing of Yugoslavia, the factory was completely renovated and modernized, reopening in April 2012 as one of Europe's state-of-the-art car factories.

During the 2010s, the JV used to be the largest foreign industrial investment in Serbia and the country's largest exporter, with exports valued at 1 billion euro ($1.1 billion) in 2016.

As of 2023, the operation had roughly 670 employees and worked closely with 15 other companies and component suppliers, many located at the adjacent Grosnica Supplier Park — with a combined workforce of roughly 6,000 tied to production at Fiat Serbia. The factory has a daily output of roughly 500 cars.

== Vehicles produced ==
=== Current ===
- Fiat Grande Panda (July 2024 – present; petrol, hybrid and electric), a five-door, five passengers, front-engine, front-wheel drive, high-roof B-segment crossover.
- Citroën C3 (March 2025 – present; electric), a five-door, five passengers, front-engine, front-wheel drive, high-roof B-segment, crossover. Built on the same platform as the Grande Panda, but only the electric version is made in Kragujevac.

=== Former ===
- Fiat 500L (2012–2022), a five-door, five passengers, front-engine, front-wheel drive, high-roof B-segment MPV, which Stellantis markets globally in more than 100 countries — with the notable exception of Russia. By early 2018, production surpassed 500,000 units.
- Fiat Punto Classic (2009–2011, 2013)
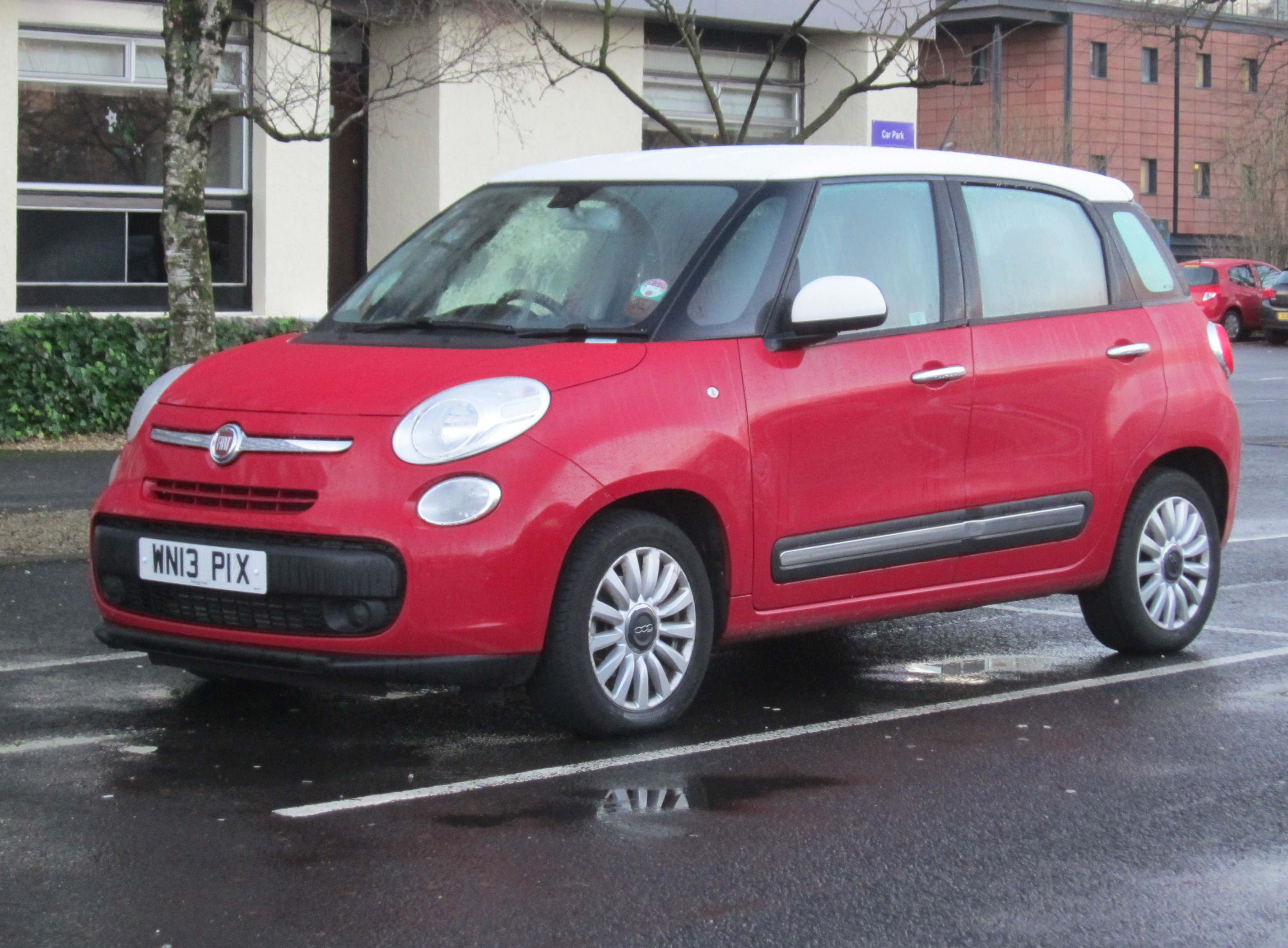
  Fiat 500L
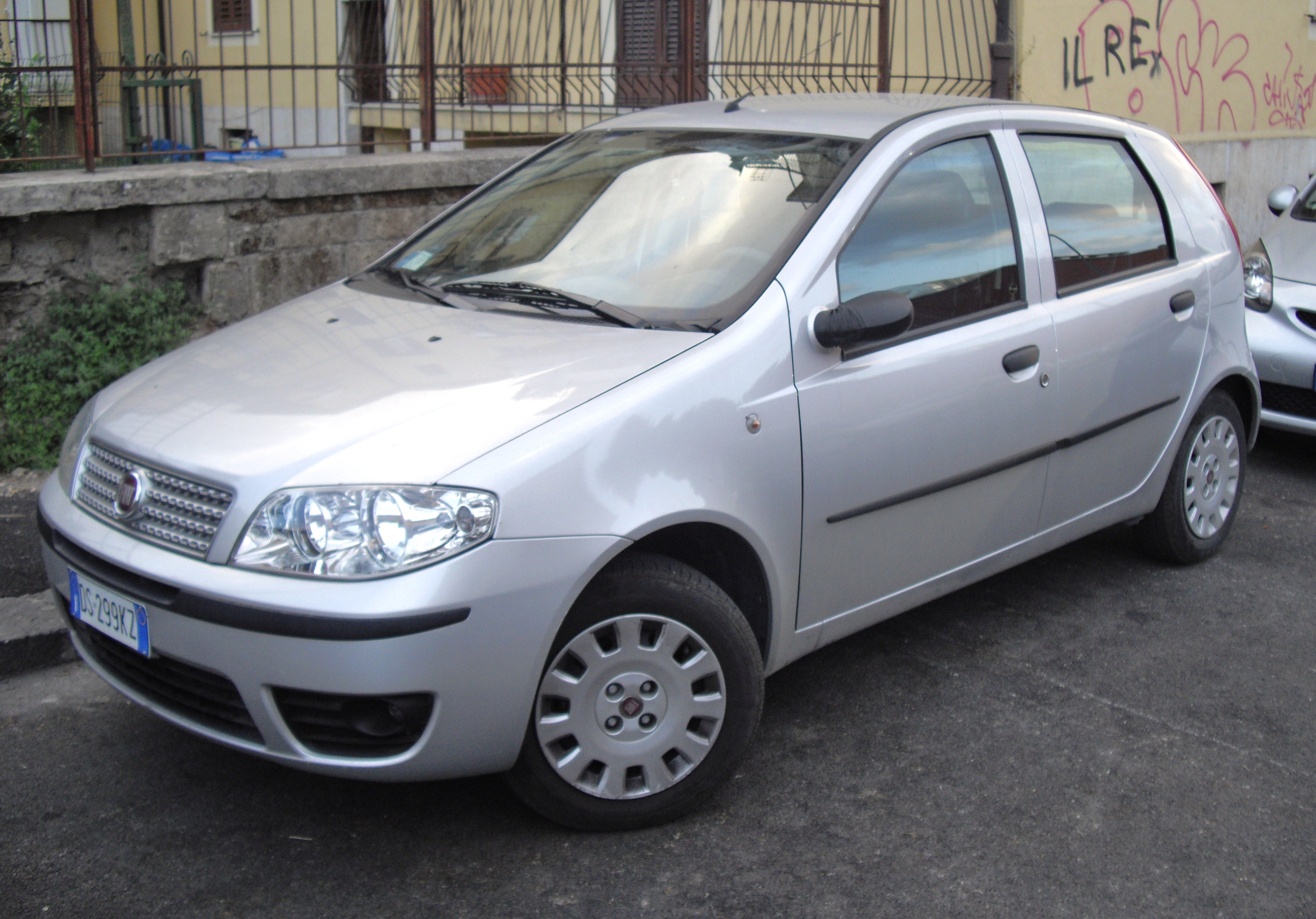
  Fiat Punto Classic
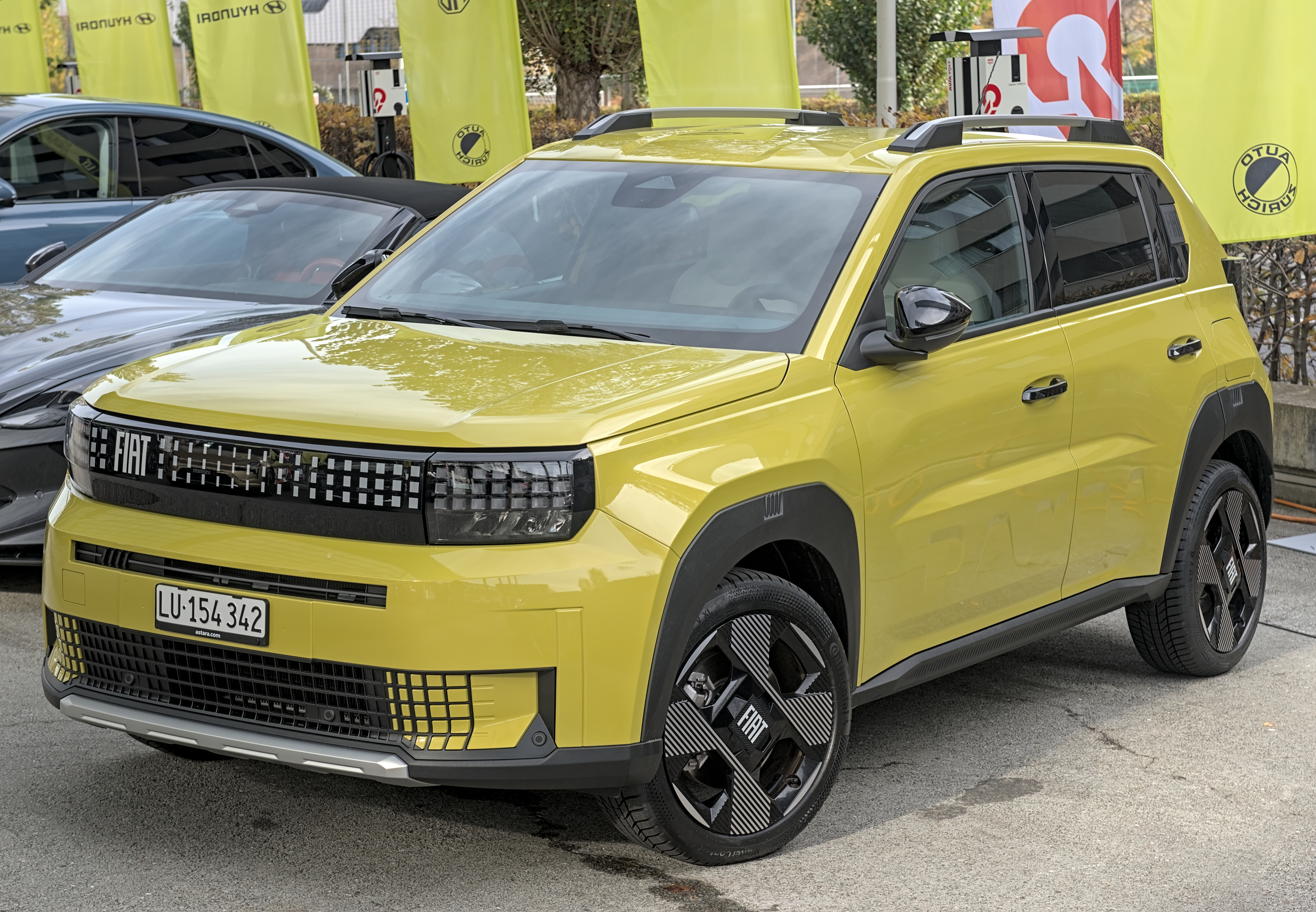
  Fiat Grande Panda

== Background ==
From 1955 to 2008, the Kragujevac plant manufactured Zastava Automobiles under the Zastava, Yugo, and Fiat brands. Serbia's central Šumadija region was severely impacted in the 1990s by the collapse of Yugoslavia, as well as the subsequent war and its sanctions. The factory buildings were severely damaged in 1999 during the Kosovar War by NATO bombings.

By the early 2000s, automotive companies began opening new manufacturing plants in nearby Hungary, Romania, Slovakia, and Slovenia — representing brands including Audi, Mercedes-Benz, Renault, and Suzuki. Manufacturing costs in Serbia were projected at one fifth those of Italy and half of those in Poland.

In April 2008, Fiat reached an agreement to purchase the Kragujevac plant, completing a joint venture with the Republic of Serbia that same year and renaming the company Fiat Automobili Srbija (FAS).

Fiat pledged €700 million in return for a 67 percent stake in the company (then owned by the state) and an additional €100 million investment by the Serbian government. This was later increased to €300 million. Fiat pledged not to cut jobs and to pay a backlog in wage payments, saying the plant would become a dedicated Fiat production site with a maximum production capacity of 330,000 units.

In the end, the financing consisted of an investment by the government of Serbia of more than €300 million, partially financed from credit of €500 million in credit given by European Investment Bank with Republic of Serbia guarantees for €300 million while €200 million of the same credit line guaranteed by Servizi Assicurativi del Commercio Estero (SACE).

While the joint venture contract is not publicized, Fiat is exempt from employee income tax and social security contributions, Serbia's profit tax for 10 years from the first year, and property taxes, among others.

In 2013, wages at Fiat were one fifth of Italian wages and one third of Polish wages. Kragujevac also offers beneficial transport links and close proximity to European markets. North American models are exported by rail and ship from the port of Bar, Montenegro.

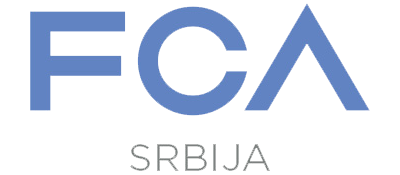
Company logo from 2014 to 2021

When FAS became a subsidiary of Fiat Chrysler Automobiles in 2014, the factory was renamed FCA Serbia (FCAS). (Note: Serbian: ФКА Србија, romanized: FCA Srbija, lit. 'FCA Serbia'.)

The original joint venture agreement between Serbia and Fiat expired on 31 December 2018, but got renewed. In 2018, FCA Srbija was Serbia's second largest (gross) exporter, at €714.1 — behind HBIS Group, owner of Smederevo Ironworks.

In 2021, following FCA merger into Stellantis, the Serbian company has been renamed Fiat Serbia. (Note: Serbian: ФИАТ Србија, romanized: FIAT Srbija, lit. 'FIAT Serbia'.)

== Plant ==
Between 2010 and 2012, Fiat Chrysler Automobiles and the Government of Serbia invested more than €500 million and spent three years upgrading the plant infrastructure, restored its buildings, developed new production departments and installed state-of-the-art machinery and production systems.

The renovated Kragujevac plant incorporates 51 buildings total and five primary process-related buildings — with an area of approximately 220,000 square meters covering more than 140 hectares adjacent to the Lepenica river.

Renovation included architectural, structural, geotechnical, mechanical, and electrical work as well as public health design, seismic retrofit design, fluid tank design, and pipe-rack bridge design. The new work included planting 1,000 native trees in the factory area and creating a bio-lake hosting several endangered species.

In 2013 the plant employed 3,800 workers with an average age of 30, and incorporates "World Class Manufacturing" standards at the silver level.

The Fiat headquarters (building 18c) has a ground floor museum, a permanent exhibition highlighting the history of the site and Kragujevac — along with a training academy as well as corporate and manufacturing offices. A nearby building has an on-site kindergarten for employee families.

The co-located Grosnica Supplier Park includes sub-works for Magneti Marelli (bumpers, spoilers, exhaust systems and catalytic converters), Johnson Controls MM (instrument panels, interior, interior parts and plastic parts), Dräxlmaier (electrical), with other plants nearby, including Adient (seats), PMC (suspension systems, sheet metal stampings and chassis assemblies), SIGIT (rubber and plastic parts) as well as HTL.

== Layoff, strike and stoppages ==
In June 2016, Fiat Serbia laid off nearly 30 percent of its workforce and ended one of its three shifts. At the time, the plant employed 3,100 with up to 900 workers per shift. European sales of the 500L had fallen by 16 percent in the first quarter of 2016.

On 27 June 2017, after two days of protests, 90% of the workforce at Fiat Serbia began a strike that ended just over two weeks later. Workers demanded an hourly wage increase from 2 to 2.40 euros, paid overtime, an end to layoffs, a work reorganization, and compensation allowance for shifts that start or finish at night, from 10 PM to 5 AM, when the public transportation isn't operating. Two unions supported the strike, the Autonomous Metalworkers' Union of Serbia (SSMS) and the Industry, Energy and Mining Workers' Union, GS IER Nezavisnost. The strike halted the factory's 440 car-per-day production.

By late March 2018, Fiat Serbia had undergone four plant closures to adjust supply to demand — the last of the stoppages from 23 March to 3 April 2018 (as of April 2018).

In May 2022, Fiat management announced that they intend to close and refurbish the plant in order to produce a new electric car beginning with 2024. Until then, workers have been offered to either relocate to a Fiat plant abroad (Italy, Germany, Poland, Slovakia), where they can earn three times more, or to accept a layoff severance pay.

By 2026, the plant employed around 3,000 workers, but employee turnover was reported to be high.

== See also ==
- Fiat Group Assembly Sites
- Stellantis Italy
