= Tofaş Museum of Cars and Anatolian Carriages =

- Tofaş Anadolu Arabaları Müzesi
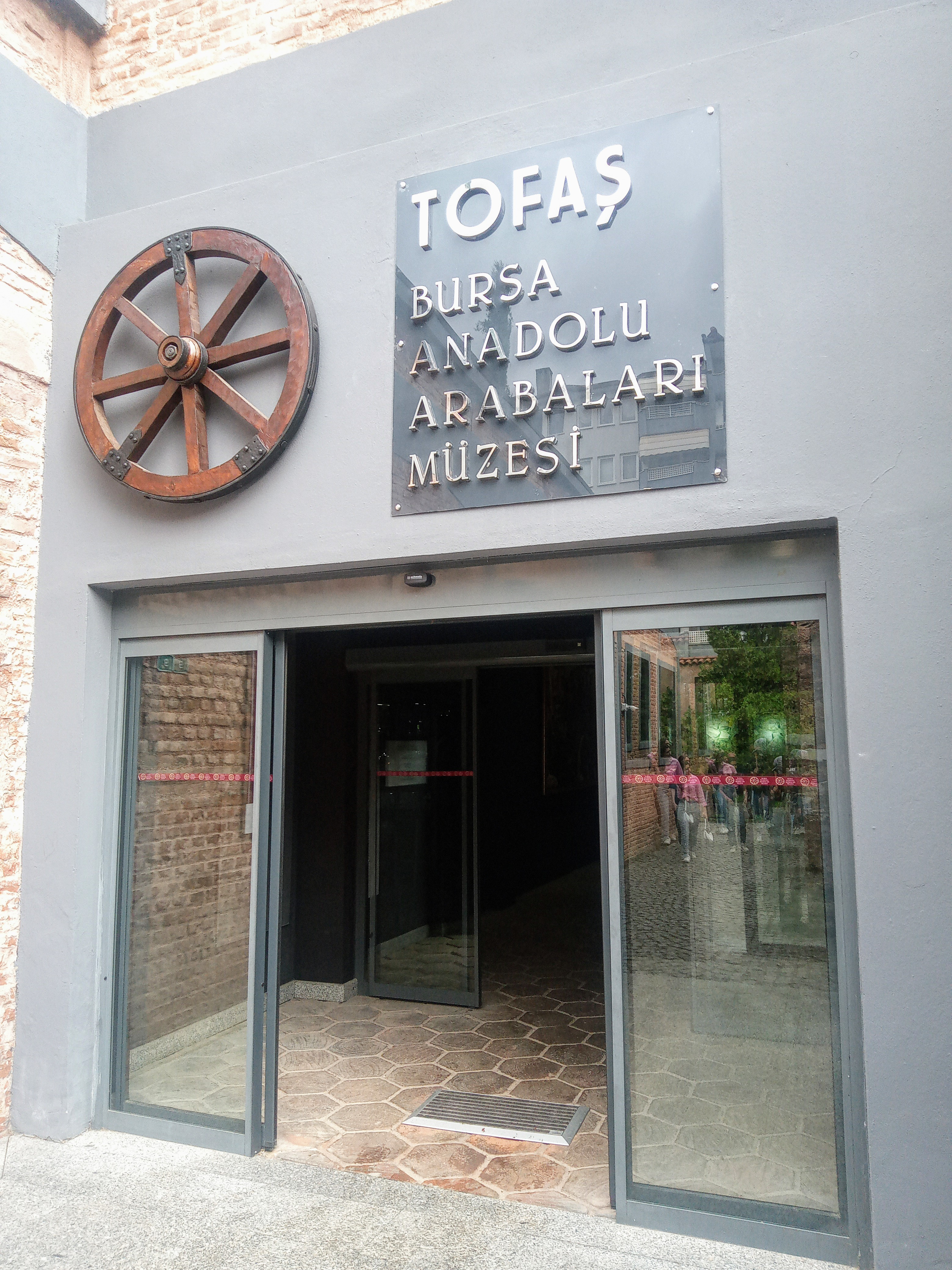

- Location within Turkey
- Established: June 30, 2002; 24 years ago
- Location: Umurbey neighborhood, Yıldırım, Bursa, Turkey
- Coordinates: 40°10′37″N 29°04′17″E
- Type: Transport museum
- Collections: Carriages, carts and cars
- Owner: Tofaş

The Tofaş Museum of Cars and Anatolian Carriages (Turkish: Tofaş Anadolu Arabaları Müzesi) is a private transport museum in Bursa, Turkey owned by the Turkish automobile maker Tofaş and dedicated to various carriages (Turkish: Araba) from Turkey and Tofaş-manufactured cars. It was opened on June 30, 2002.

Situated in the historic Umurbey neighborhood of Yıldırım district, the museum is housed in a renovated building of 17,000 m^{2} (180,000 sq ft) that was an abandoned silk production plant. The facility was leased to the Bursa-based Tofaş Company for museum purposes by the Metropolitan Municipality of Bursa.

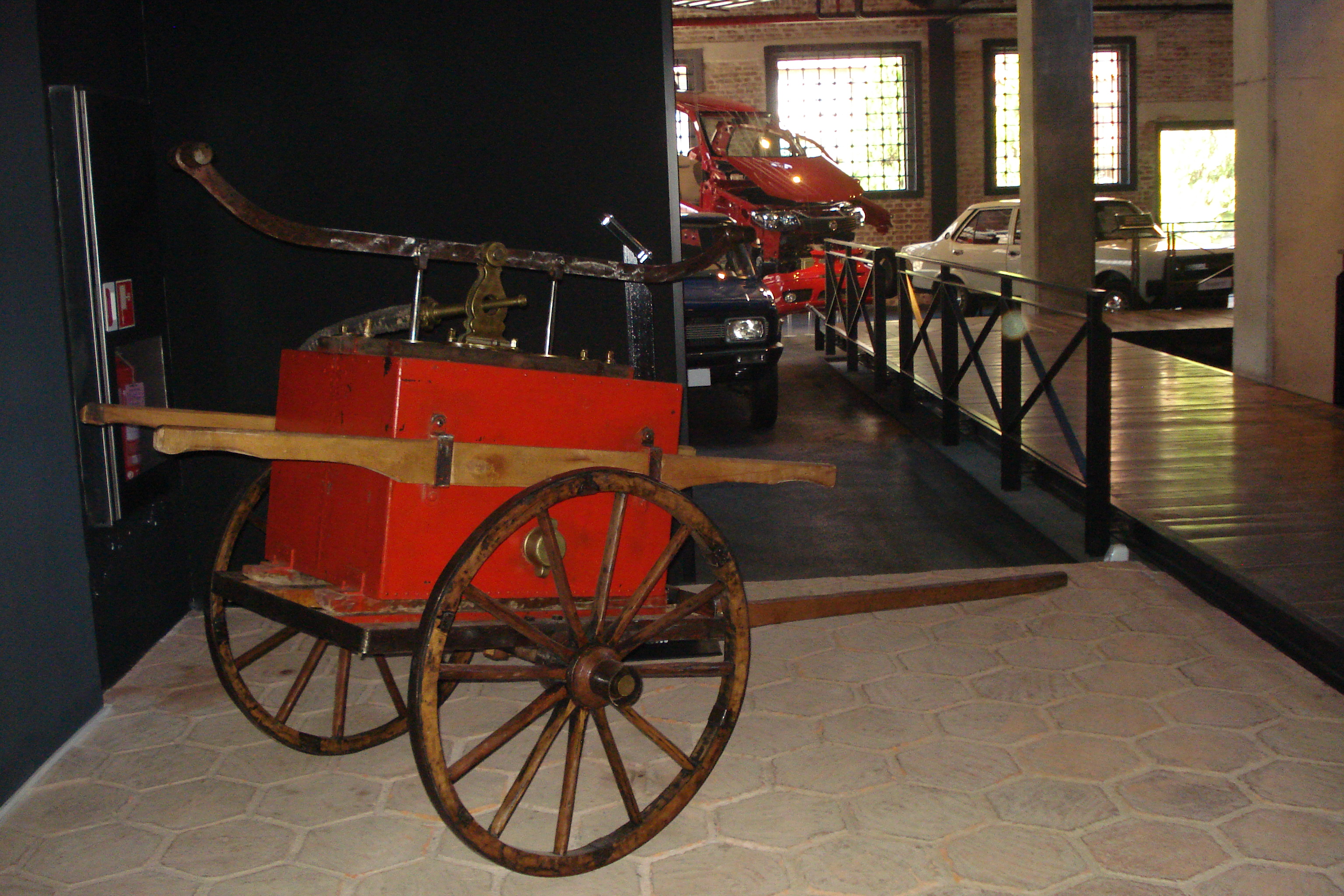
A "tulumbacı" cart in the museum. Tulumbacıs were the firefighters in Ottoman Turkey.

The museum's collection consists of historic carriages including a two-axle horse-drawn Bursa carriage, oxen drawn carts, canon carriages, wains for hay and firewood, phaetons, powered carriages, Tatar carriage, which are examples of fine carpentry and blacksmithing. The most important exhibit of the museum is the replica of a 6th-century B.C. chariot, which was reproduced between 1998 and 1999 from artifacts unearthed during roadworks in a crypt at Üçpınar Tumulus near Balıkesir. The chariot was formerly on display at the Bursa Archaeological Museum.

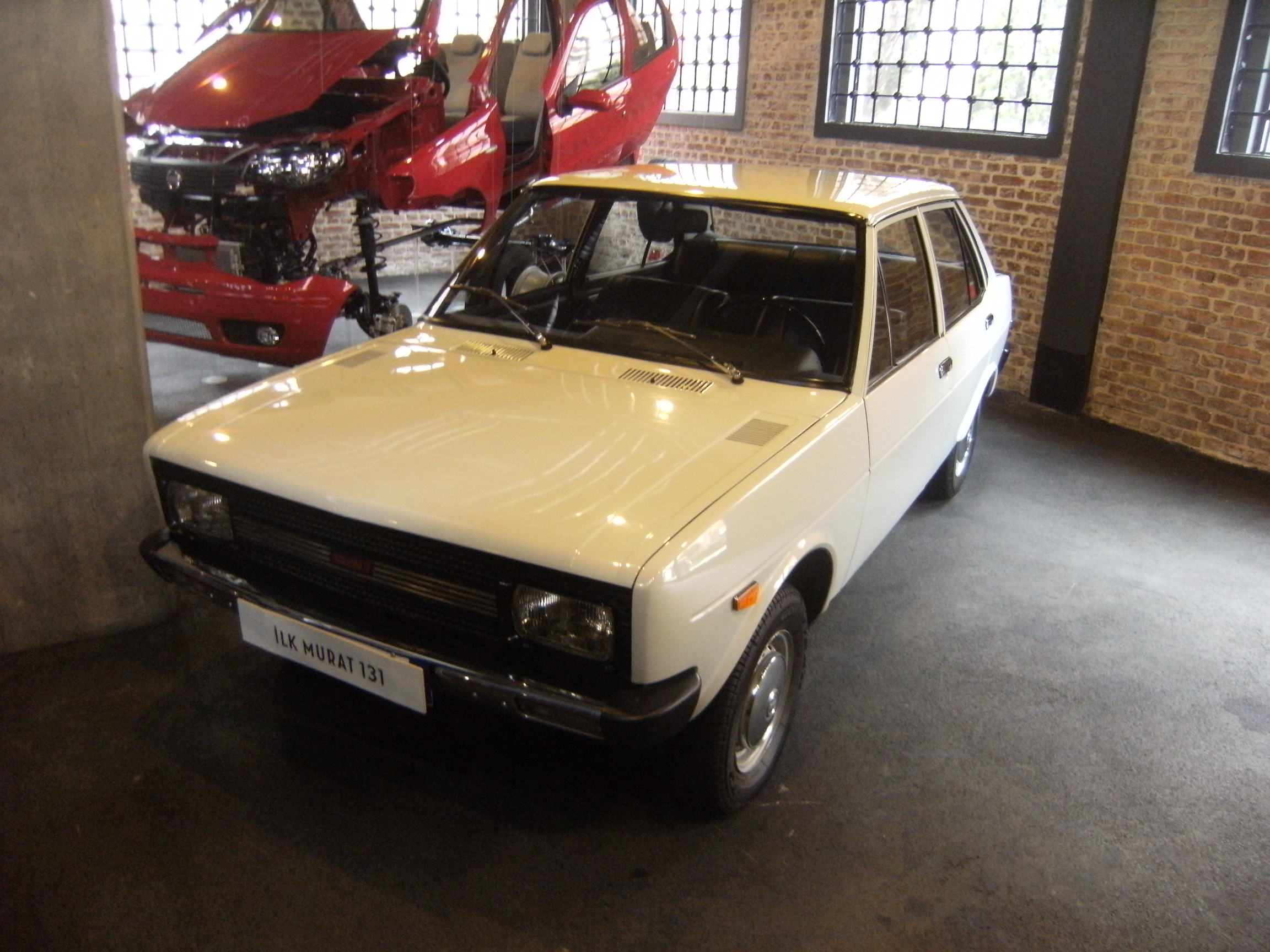
The first Murat 131 built in Turkey

Further museum exhibits are automobiles including the first Murat 124 (Fiat 124) built in Turkey, Tofaş Şahin (Fiat 131), Fiat Uno, Fiat Tipo, Fiat Doblò and Fiat Albea. In a special corner, trophies won by Tofaş in motorsport are on display.

The museum also hosts events like temporary exhibitions of technological art as well as jazz concerts during the Bursa International Festival.

The museum is open to the public everyday but Mondays from 10:00 to 17:00 hours local time.

== See also ==
- List of automobile museums
