= El Nasr Automotive Manufacturing Company =

Egyptian automotive manufacturer

Nasr
- Company type: Public
- Industry: Automotive
- Founded: 1960
- Headquarters: Helwan, Cairo, Egypt
- Products: Automobiles
- Website: nasr.eg

Nasr (Arabic: نصر, long form: El Nasr Automotive Manufacturing Company) is Egypt's state owned automobile company. It was founded in 1960 in Helwan, Egypt. Since, the company has produced licensed versions of the Fiat 1100 R, Fiat 1300, Fiat 2300, Fiat 128, Fiat 125, Fiat 133, Fiat 126, series 2 Fiat 127, 1983–92 FSO Polonez and in 1991 introduced a further range of Fiat-designed cars licensed via the Turkish company Tofaş. In the early 2000s Nasr began producing the Florida range under license from Serbian manufacturer Zastava.

== History ==
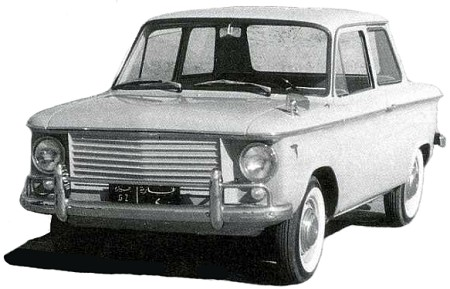
Ramses II

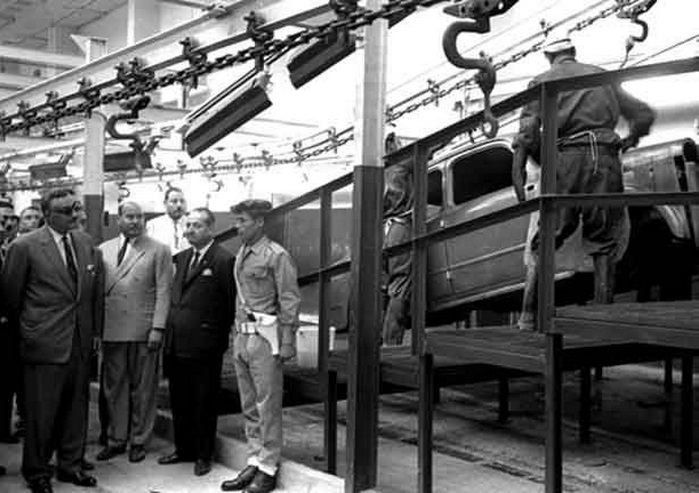
Egyptian President Gamal Abdel Nasser at the opening ceremony of the Al Nasr's factory at the Helwan Steel Works on 21 July 1963

Nasr was a replacement for the short-lived Ramses automobile (also state produced), which suffered from poor design and performance (basically a redesigned NSU Prinz). The Nasr was intended to be an affordable car for the average person of means. The company's creation was also part of the general industrialization process initiated after the Egyptian Revolution of 1952, which would see millions of Egyptians flock to urban areas to gain work in newly built factories and industrial centers.

The decision to focus on assembly of foreign licensed cars under the Nasr marque was primarily based on the desire to avoid the engineering and design problems associated with previous attempts at domestic car manufacture. Furthermore, the compact and comparatively affordable Fiat-based cars (produced in conjunction with FSO and Zastava) were well suited to the Egyptian market. Nasr would later expand to production of utility and agricultural vehicles such as trucks.

As the years progressed, Nasr's best-selling model, the 128 GLS, began to show its age (its design had not been modified since the 1970s). Consequently, Nasr began production of a new range of vehicles, once again based on existing Fiat models, including the Regata, and Fiat-based models licensed by Tofaş, particularly the Dogan and Şahin. The early 21st century saw the relationship with Zastava expanded with production of the Nasr Florida.

Nasr's position in Egypt remains strong, largely due to its brand recognition and comparative affordability vis a vis foreign produced vehicles. However, its cars' relative lack of modern design (especially in terms of otherwise standard safety and comfort features), and the increased availability of low-to-mid range foreign brands in Egypt (such as Škoda) have increased the level of competition in Nasr's core market.

Nasr ended the production of passenger vehicles in 2009.

The company resumed production in 2024 after a 15-year hiatus, beginning with electric buses in partnership with China’s Yutong. It markets three bus models under its own brand: Nasr Green, Nasr Sky, and Nasr Star. The company plans to reintroduce passenger cars by the end of 2025, targeting an annual output of 20,000 vehicles.

== Current Nasr produced automobiles ==
- Nasr E70: based on the Dongfeng E70

== Discontinued Nasr produced automobiles ==
- Nasr Sahin 1400S and 1600 SL : based on the Tofaş Şahin. From 2005 offered a fuel injection engine - no longer in production
- Nasr 125: based on the Polski Fiat 125p - no longer in production
- Nasr 128 GLS 1300: based on the Zastava 128 - no longer in production
- Nasr Florida 1400: based on the Zastava Florida - no longer in production
- Nasr Polonez: based on the FSO Polonez from 1978–1991 years - no longer in production
- Nasr Dogan: based on the Tofaş Doğan - no longer in production since 1995 (it was replaced by Sahin 1600 in 2005)
- Nasr Kartal : based on the Tofaş Kartal - no longer in production

== Gallery ==
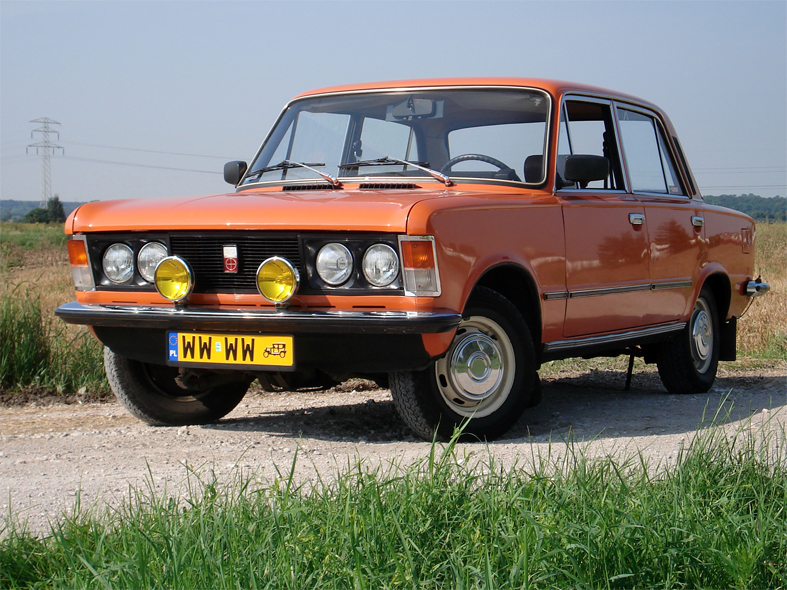
Polski Fiat 125p

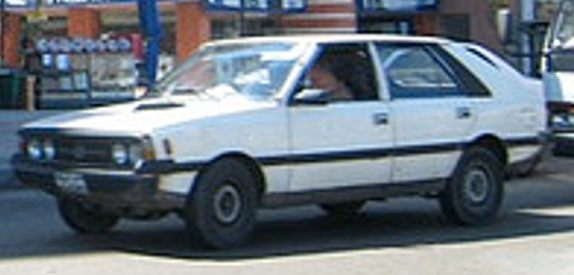
FSO Polonez

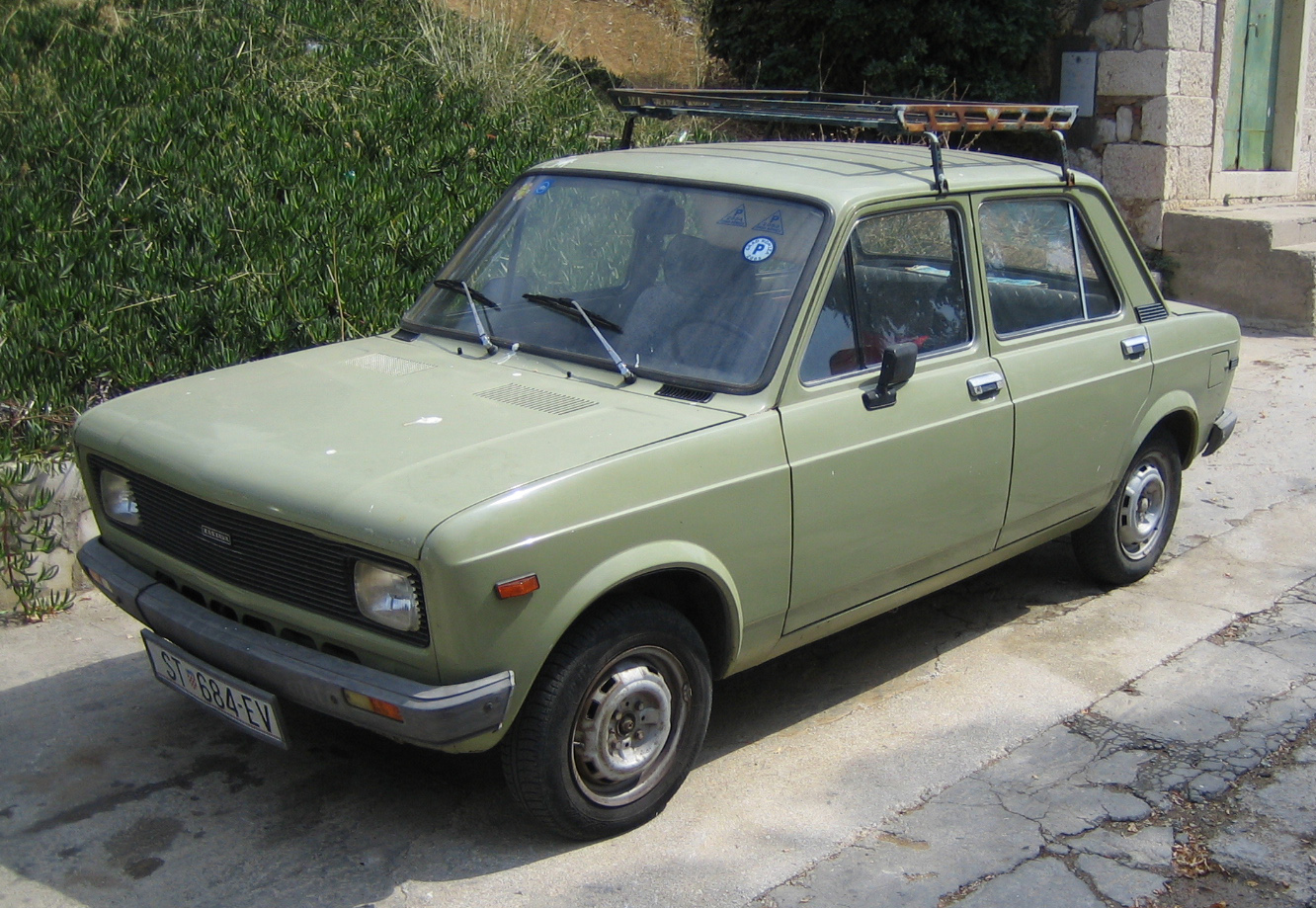
Zastava 128

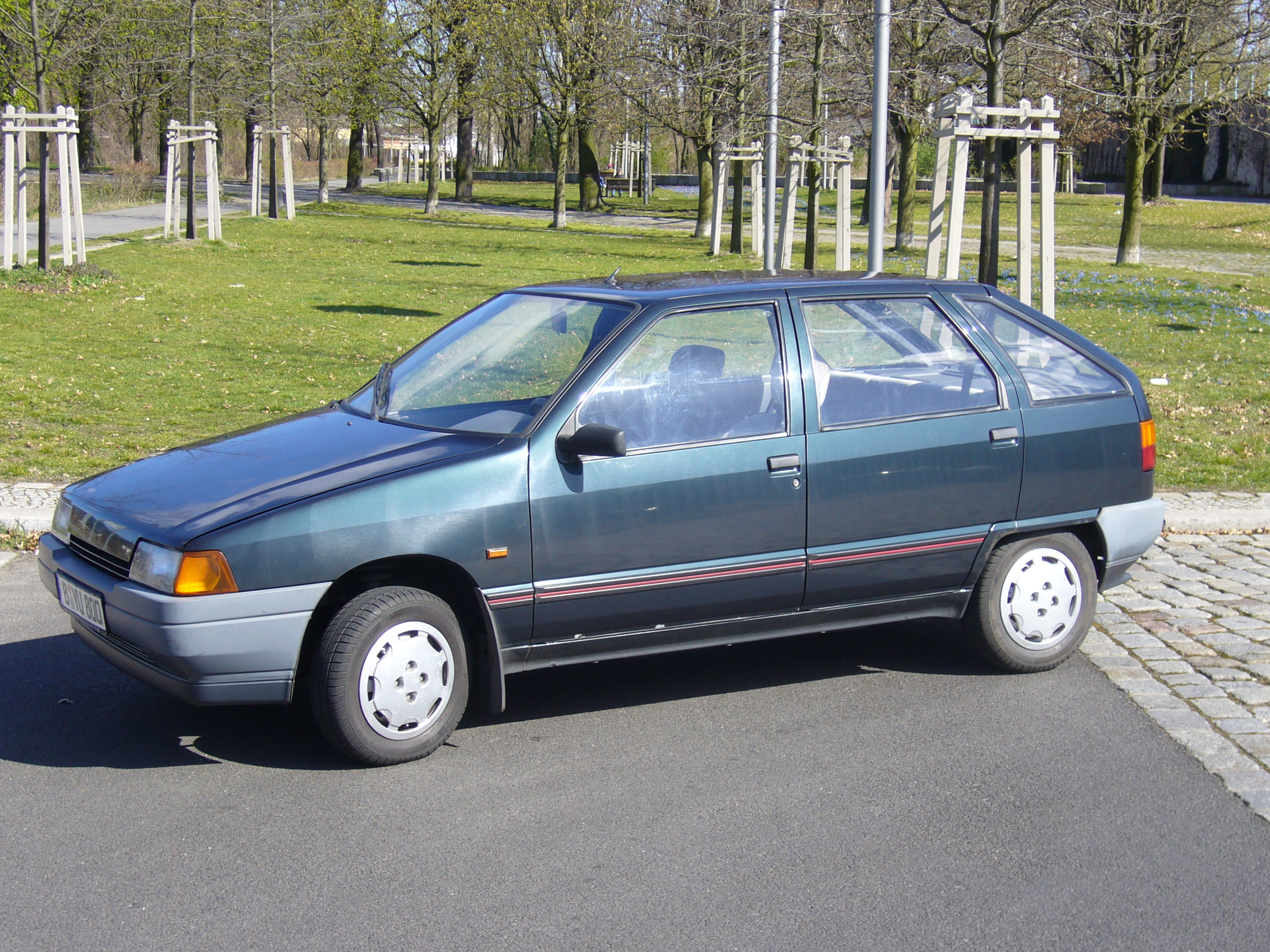
Zastava Florida

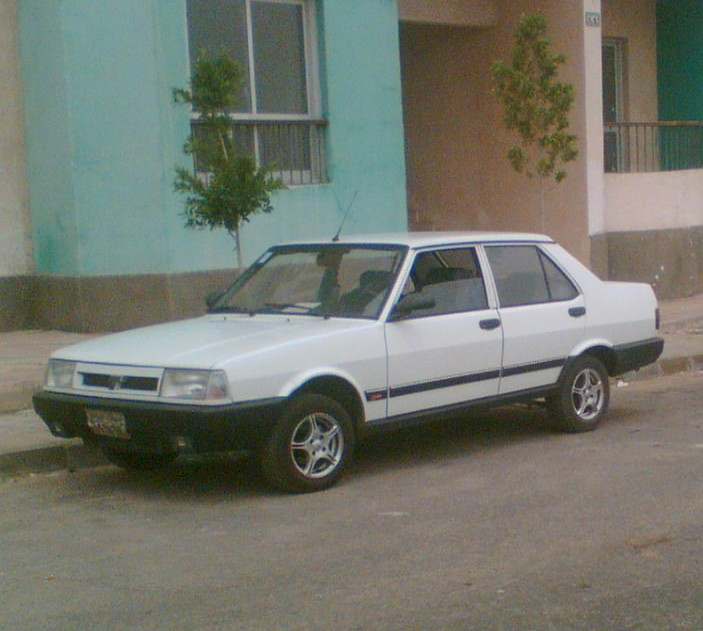
Tofaş Şahin in Egypt

== Production figures ==
- 1962 - 863
- 1963 - 3806
- 1964 - 4527
- 1965 - 4004
- 1966 - 1615
- 1967 - 108
- 1968 - 758
- 1969 - 2325
- 1970 - 3590
- 1971 - 5750
- 2000 - 3201
- 2001 - 3275
- 2002 - 1903
- 2003 - 1418
- 2004 - 5898

Total production from 1961 until 2005 = 402,536 units. (Production statistics OICA data)
