= Tofaş =

Turkish automaker which was established in 1968 by Vehbi Koç

TOFAŞ Türk Otomobil Fabrikası A.Ş

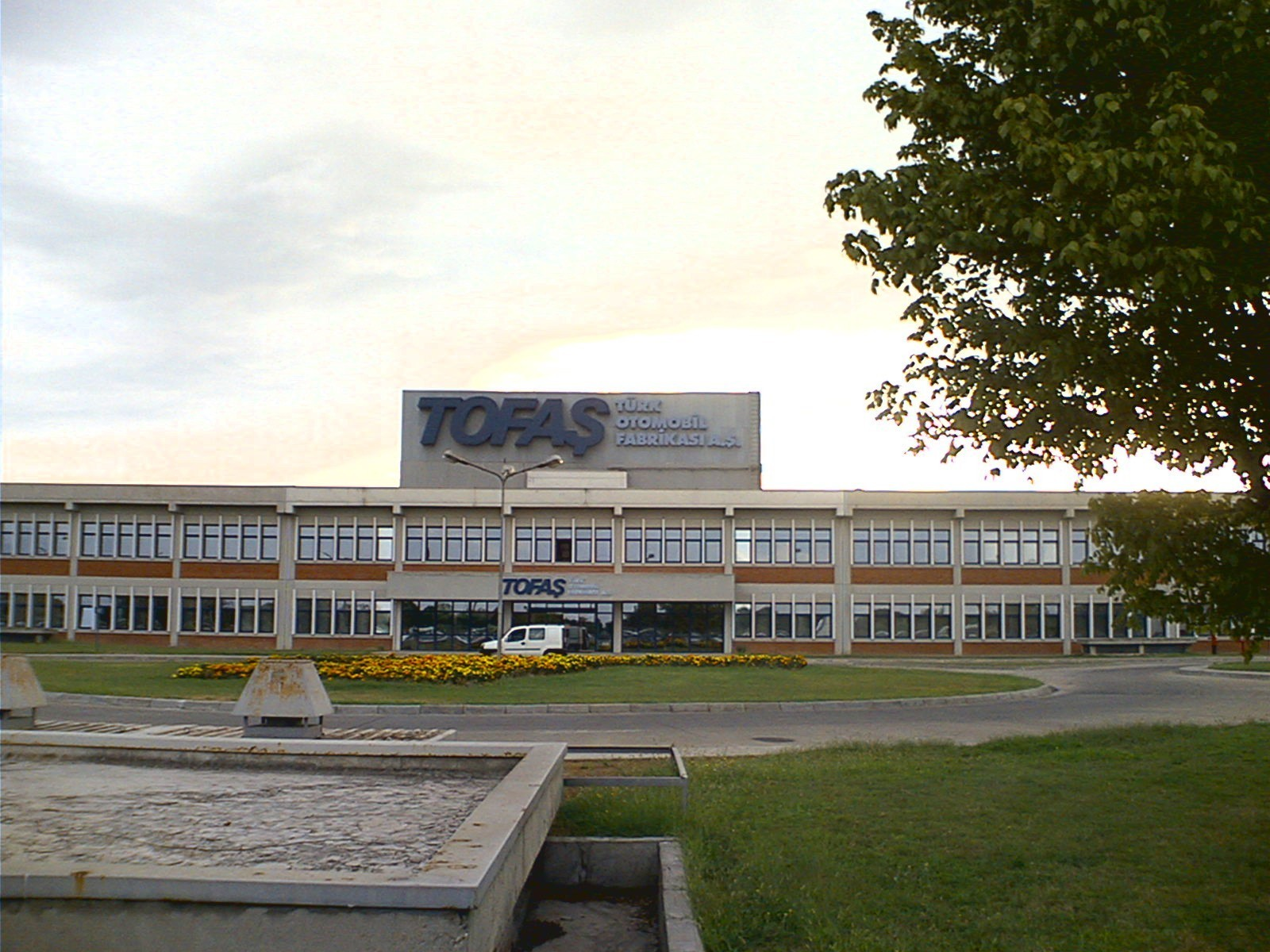
- Front of the Building - Tofas- Bursa, Turkey.
- Type: Public
- Traded as: BİST: TOASO
- Industry: Automotive
- Founded: 1968; 58 years ago
- Headquarters: Istanbul, Turkey; plant Bursa, Turkey
- Area served: Europe, Middle East, Central Asia
- Key people: Cengiz Eroldu (CEO); Fabrizio Renzi (CFO)
- Products: Automobiles, Commercial Vehicles, Spare Parts, Die Manufacturing, Consumer Financing
- Production output: 450,000 units per year
- Revenue: ▲US$4.40 billion (2023)
- Operating income: ▲US$483 million (2023)
- Net income: ▲US$520 million (2023)
- Total assets: ▲US$2.71 billion (2023)
- Total equity: ▲US$1.27 billion (2023) )
- Owner: Stellantis Europe (37.8%); Koç Holding (37.8%)
- Number of employees: 7,000
- Website: tofas.com.tr

TOFAŞ Türk Otomobil Fabrikası A.Ş (acronym for Türk Otomobil Fabrikası Anonim Şirketi; Turkish Automobile Factory Joint-Stock Company pronounced [tofaʃ]) is a Turkish automobile manufacturer which was established in 1968 by Vehbi Koç, who founded Koç Holding, based in Bursa, where the manufacturing plant of the company is located. It is jointly owned by Stellantis and Koç Holding (37.8% of the company's shares belong to Stellantis (through Fiat Group Automobiles); 37.8% to Koç Holding; and 24.3% freefloat).

Tofaş manufactures both passenger cars and light commercial vehicles. It is one of the biggest automakers in the sector, with its 7,000 employees and 450,000 vehicles annual production capacity. Tofaş manufactures for the Fiat, Citroën, Peugeot, Opel, Vauxhall and RAM brands in Bursa, which has achieved for it the “Gold Level” within the scope of the WCM-World Class Manufacturing Program that is implemented in the 175 plants within the framework of Stellantis.

Tofaş plays a leading role in the Turkish automotive sector; it conducts sales and after sales operations for the Fiat, Alfa Romeo, Lancia, Jeep, Ferrari, and Maserati brands in Turkey.

Tofaş exported 160,000 units to 80 countries in 2013. It also recorded 7 billion TL net sales income and 434 million TL net profit. Fulfilling 22% of the total production in Turkey with its 240,000 units in the previous year, Tofaş achieved 1.6 billion euro export income by increasing its export volume by 4%.

== History ==
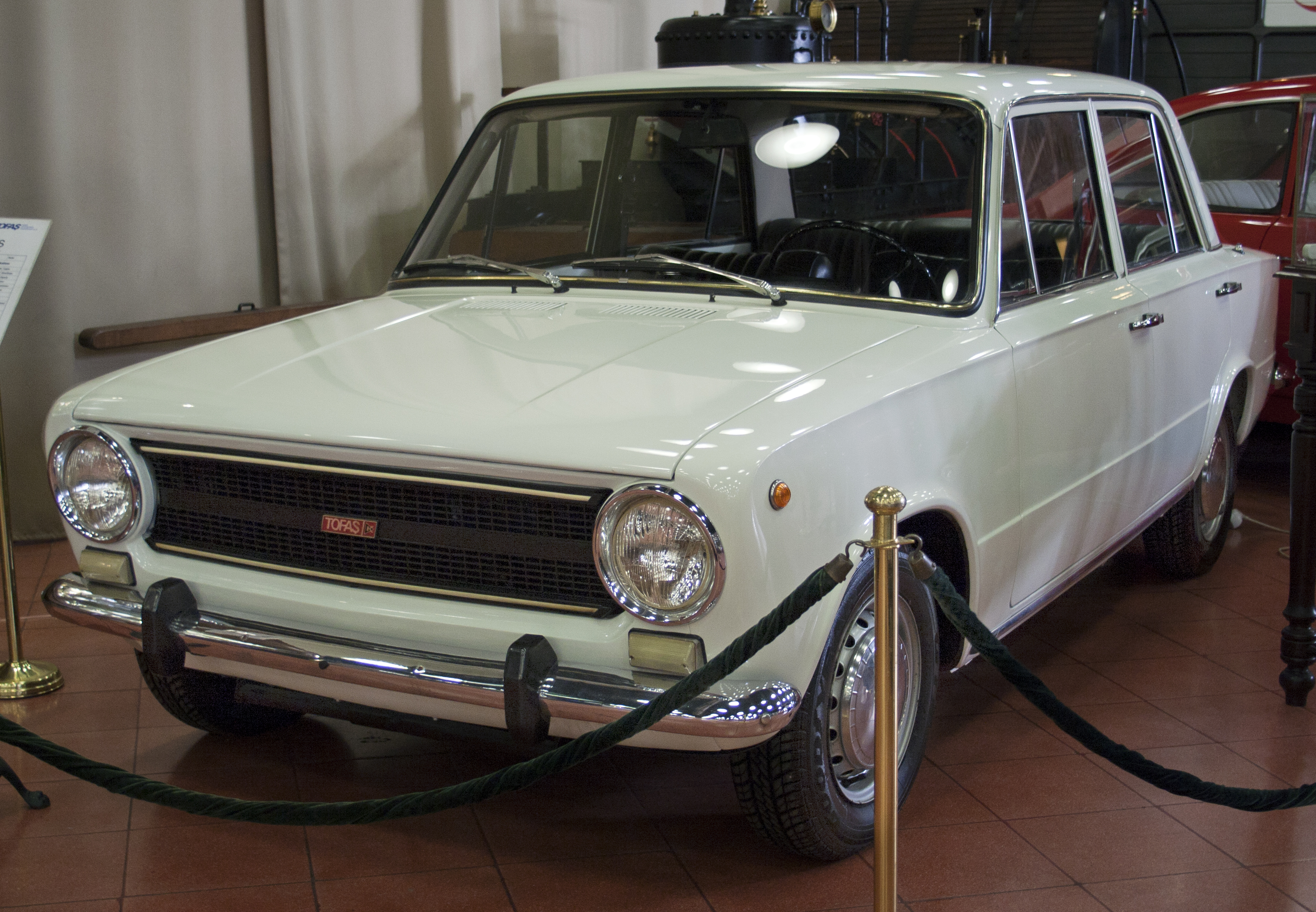
Tofaş Murat 124

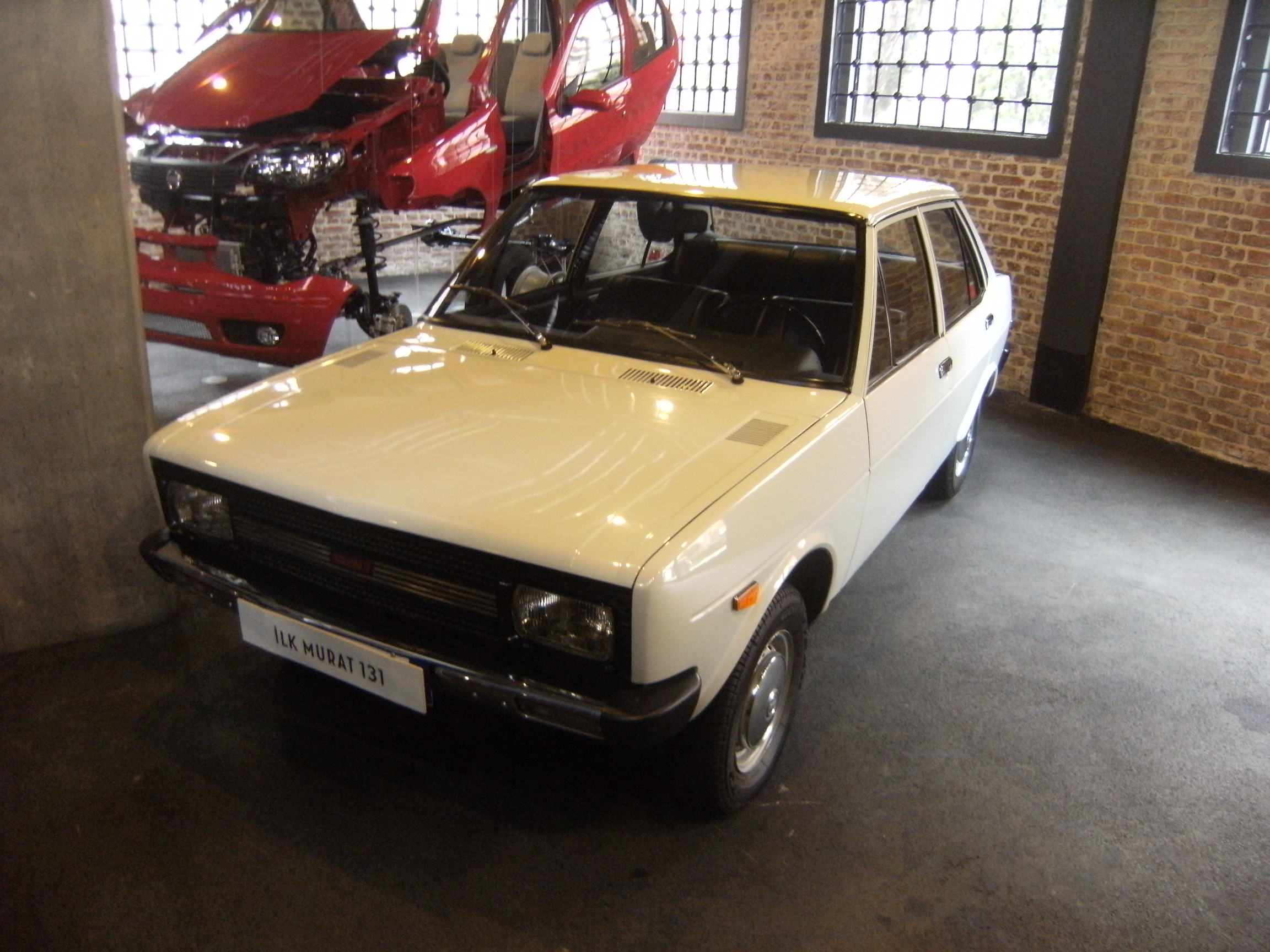
The first Murat 131 built by Tofaş.

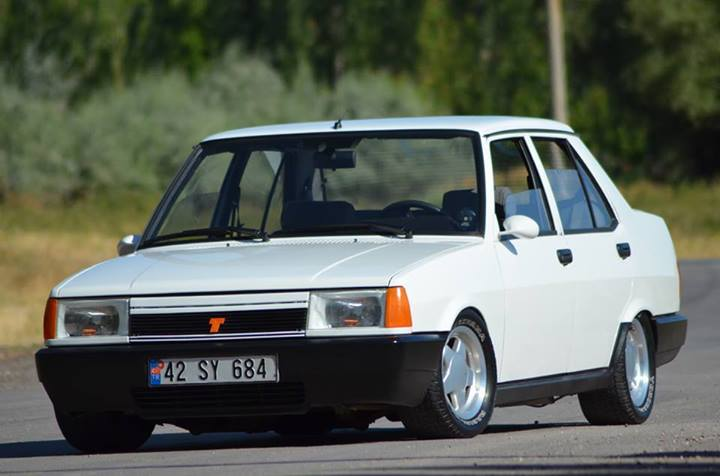
A modified Tofaş Şahin

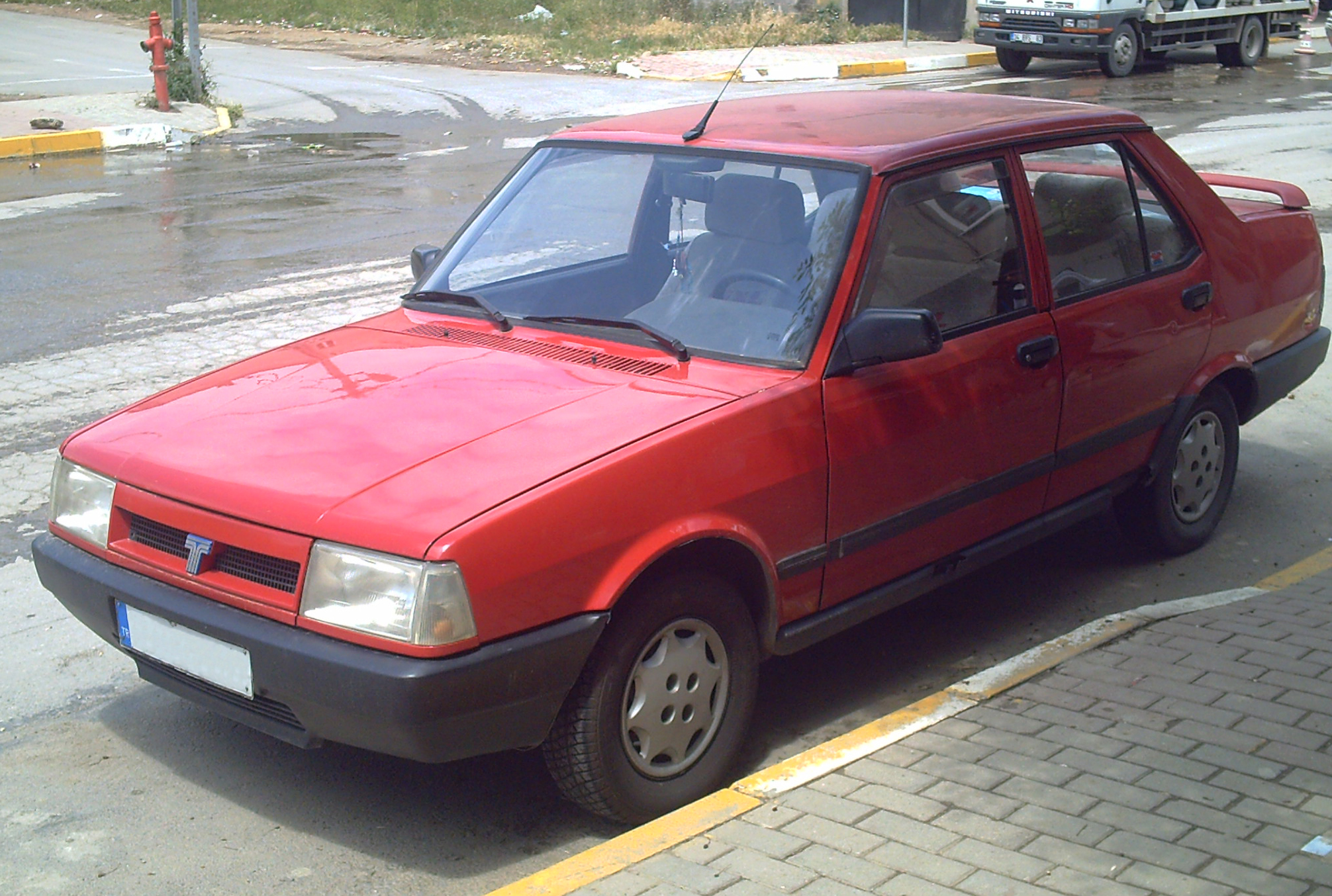
A stock Tofaş Doğan

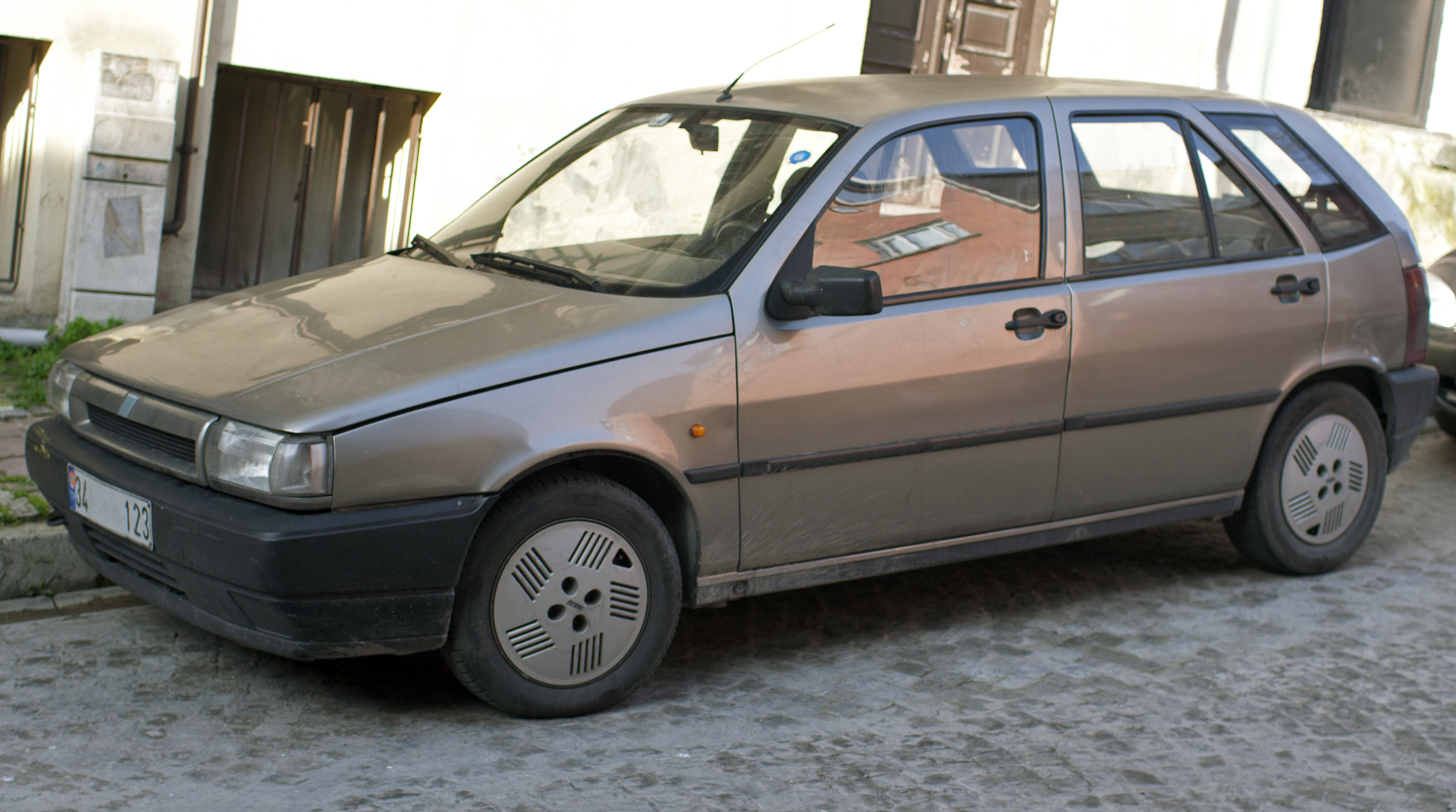
Tofaş-Fiat Tipo

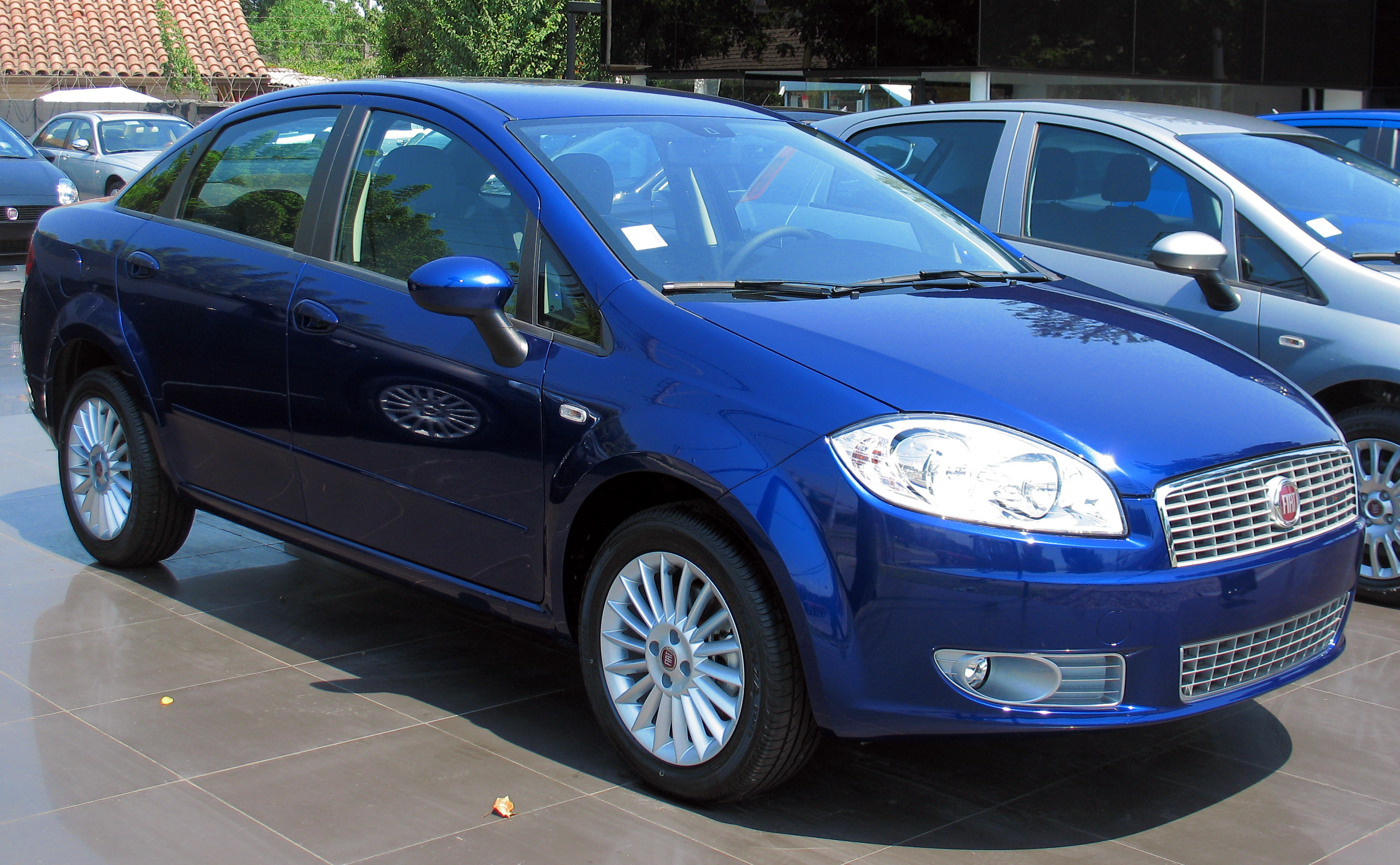
The first Fiat Linea was co-developed and produced in the Tofaş Fiat factory in Bursa, which remains the model's primary production plant for the EU market.

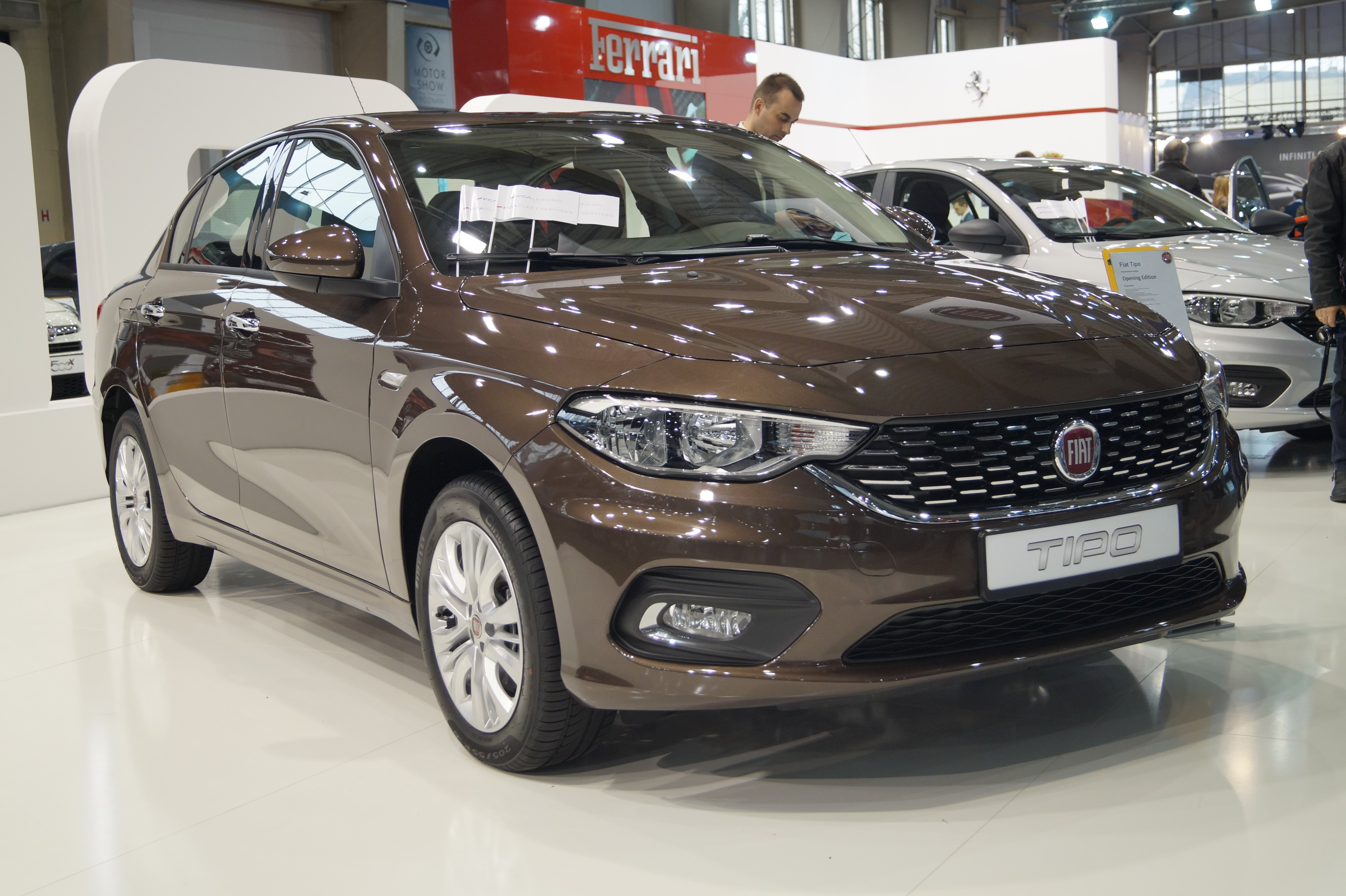
New Fiat Tipo/Egea

Tofaş was founded in 1968. The company’s production plant was established in Bursa in 1969, marking the beginning of its manufacturing operations in Turkey. In 1971, Tofaş introduced its first model, the Fiat 124, produced under license from Fiat and locally named Murat 124 (with a later version called Serçe). This year also saw the establishment of Tofaş's first motorsports team.

In 1973, Tofaş formed a spare parts company called OPAR, (OPAR is an abbreviation for Orjinal Parça (Turkish) or Original Parts (English), probably inspired from MOPAR) focusing on the sale of spare parts for a variety of vehicle brands. The company’s sports activities were further formalized in 1974 with the founding of the Tofaş Sport Club. Tofaş expanded its export market in 1975 by shipping vehicles to Egypt, its first international market. In 1976, Tofaş began production of the Murat 131 model.

The company’s product lineup grew in the early 1980s, with the start of production for the Kartal and Dogan models in 1981. Production of Fiat 131 and its derivatives continued until 2003 and until 2010 in CKD form. In 1990, Tofaş began producing the Tempra, and in 1994, the Uno model was introduced. That same year, Tofaş established its Research and Development (R&D) division. Exports of the Tempra began in 1995, marking a broader international presence for the company. In 1997, Tofaş and OPAR merged into a single entity.

In 1999, Tofaş began production of the Marea and Brava models, followed by the Doblò in 2000 which was designed by Tofaş. The company also launched the Tofaş Basketball Volunteer Project in 2000. In 2001, Tofaş merged its production plant with Tofaş Oto Ticaret, the company’s automotive trade division. That year, the company entered into a partnership with Alfa Romeo, which began producing cars at the Tofaş factory.

The Albea model entered production in 2002, and in 2003, Tofaş opened the Tofaş Museum of Cars in Anatolia. In 2005, Tofaş became the official distributor of Ferrari and Maserati in Turkey, establishing the Fer Mas company to manage these brands. Exports to Russia of the Palio and Albea models began in 2006.

Tofaş acquired official distribution rights for Lancia in 2007 and completed the Minicargo project, resulting in the launch of the Fiat Fiorino. The vehicle was also sold to PSA as the Peugeot Bipper and Citroën Nemo, marking the first time Tofaş sold the rights to one of its models. In 2009, the Albea Sole model was introduced, and Tofaş S.K. won promotion to the Turkish Basketball Super League.

In 2012, following the merger between Fiat and Chrysler, Jeep joined Tofaş in Turkey. By this time, the company had produced 4 million vehicles. In 2013, Tofaş formed a partnership with Magneti Marelli for the sale of automotive parts in Turkey and achieved the WCM “Gold Level” at its Bursa production plant.

Tofaş continued its investment in education and innovation by opening the Tofaş Academy in 2014 and establishing the Tofaş Science High School the same year. In 2023, the company announced that it would consolidate the commercial activities of all Stellantis brands under Tofaş.

== Annual production ==
- 1972–20,000 units
- 1984–35,000 units
- 1990–100,000 units
- 1993–250,000 units
- 2007–360,000 units
- 2008–400,000 units

== Models and production years ==
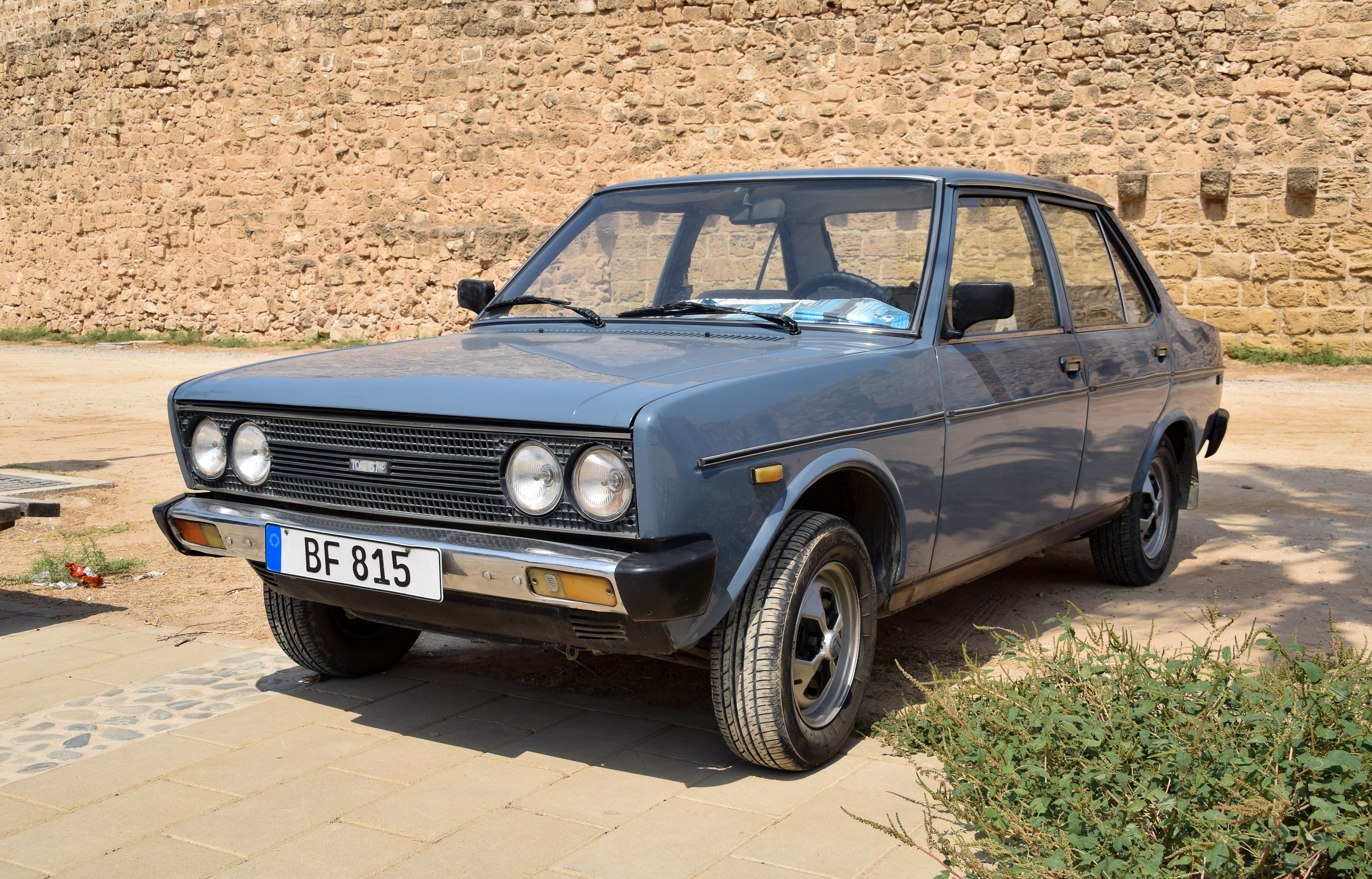
1981-1984 Tofaş Murat 131 Şahin

- 1971 - Murat 124
- 1976 - Murat 131
- 1981 - 131 Kartal and 131 Doğan
- 1983 - 124 Serçe and 131 Kartal (new body)
- 1988 - 131 Şahin, Doğan and Kartal (new body)
- 1990 - Fiat Tempra
- 1993 - Fiat Tipo and Tempra SW
- 1994 - Fiat Uno
- 1998 - Fiat Palio, Palio Weekend and Siena
- 1999 - Fiat Marea and Brava
- 2000 - Fiat Doblò
- 2002 - Fiat Albea
- 2005 - Fiat Linea
- 2007 - Mini Cargo (Fiat Fiorino - Peugeot Bipper - Citroën Nemo)
- 2009 - Fiat Doblò
- 2015 - Fiat Tipo/Egea

=== Current production ===
Tofaş currently produces the following models for Stellantis:

- Fiat Tipo (2015)
- Citroën Jumpy/Dispatch/SpaceTourer
- Fiat Scudo/Ulysse
- Peugeot Expert/Traveller
- Opel/Vauxhall Vivaro/Zafira
- Toyota ProAce (Verso)

=== Discontinued ===
Old models the company has produced in the past include:

- Fiat 124, as the Tofaş Murat 124 and later Tofaş Serçe
- Fiat 131, as the Tofaş Murat 131, Şahin, Doğan, or Kartal
- Tipo
- Tempra
- Uno
- Brava
- Linea
- Marea
- Palio
- Siena
- Albea
- Qubo
- Citroën Nemo
- Peugeot Bipper
- Opel Combo
- Fiat Doblò
- Ram ProMaster City
- Fiat Fiorino

== Logo ==
Tofas (1968-2008)

Tofas (2008–present)

== See also ==
- Karsan
- Pirin-Fiat
- Holland Car
- Zastava
- Tofaş Museum of Cars and Anatolian Carriages
