= Holland Car =

Ethiopian CKD automobile assembler

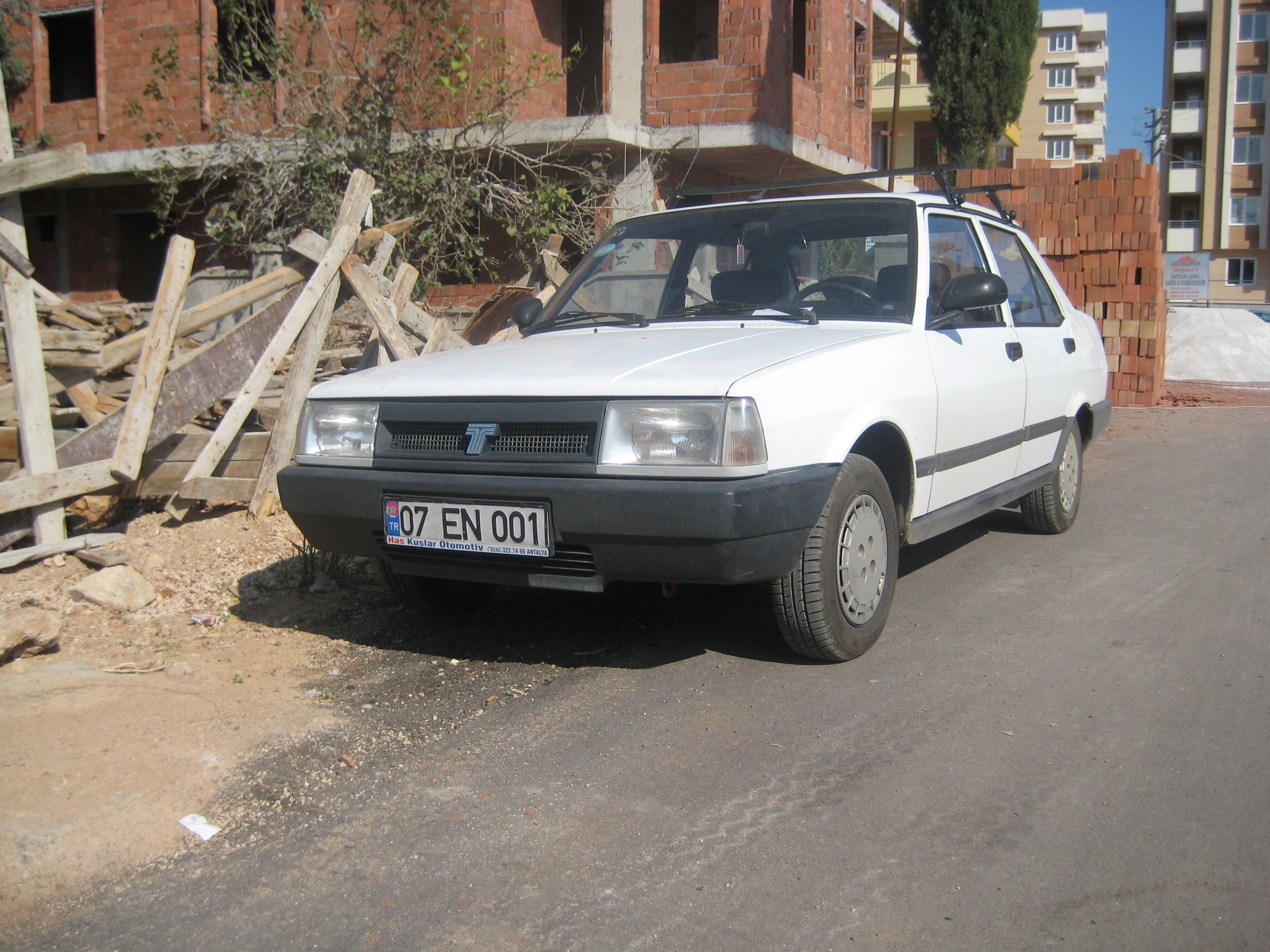
Tofas Sahin, modernized version of Fiat 131 produced in Turkey

Holland Car PLC (ኔዘርላንድ መኪና) was an Ethiopian CKD automobile assembler with official head offices in the Getu Commercial Center and the TK International Building in Addis Ababa. Its general manager was Tadesse Tessema Alemu, and the company had 200 full-time employees and a fluctuating number of part-time ones. The firm was declared in bankruptcy at FY2014.

== Overview ==
Holland Car operated with two plants. Its main plant was located in Mojo. The second assembly plant was opened in the late 2008 under the name Cassiopeia Assembly Factory and is located in Tatek.

Holland Car was founded in 2005, as a joint-venture between the Trento Engineering BV and Ethio-Holland PLC, an Ethiopian importer of used Lada automobiles from the Netherlands. Its first product was the Holland DOCC (Dutch Overseas Car Company) which is a rebadged Tofaş Şahin. Beginning in 2007, Holland Car assembled the Lifan 520 as the Holland Abay, but the relationship with the Chinese Lifan Group was ended in 2009. Holland Car claims that the Chinese company attempted to take control of its Ethiopian partner, while Lifan states that the reason for the termination was that sales did not meet expectations. In 2009, the company started a new joint-venture with JAC Motors. New products in 2009 were the Holland Tekeze, the Holland Abay Executive and the Holland Awash Executive. The newest product of Holland Car is the Shebelle, first released in 2010.

In 2009 Holland Car was the winner of the Africa's Small, Medium and Micro Enterprises Award in the category of most innovative company, and the Overall winner of the 2009 Africa SMME of the year.

== Model lineup ==
- Holland DOCC (2005–2010)
- Holland ABAY (2007–2010)
- Holland ABAY Executive (2009–2013)
- Holland Awash Executive (2009–2013)
- Holland Tekeze (2009–2013)
- Holland Shebelle (2010–2013)
- Holland Emay (2011–2013)
- Holland Naomi (2011–2013)
- Holland Ahadu (2011–2013)
