= Tofaş Şahin =

Car model

The Tofaş Şahin, Doğan, and Kartal are Turkish versions of the Fiat 131 automobile made in the Türk Otomobil Fabrikası A.Ş. factory in Bursa, Turkey. While doğan means "falcon" in Turkish, kartal means "eagle" and şahin means "hawk". In Turkey, they are informally referred to as Kuş Serisi, meaning "Bird Series". The cars were built from 1977 and sold in Turkey until 2002, with Egyptian assembly coming to an end in 2009 and in Ethiopia until 2010.

== First generation ==
1st gen
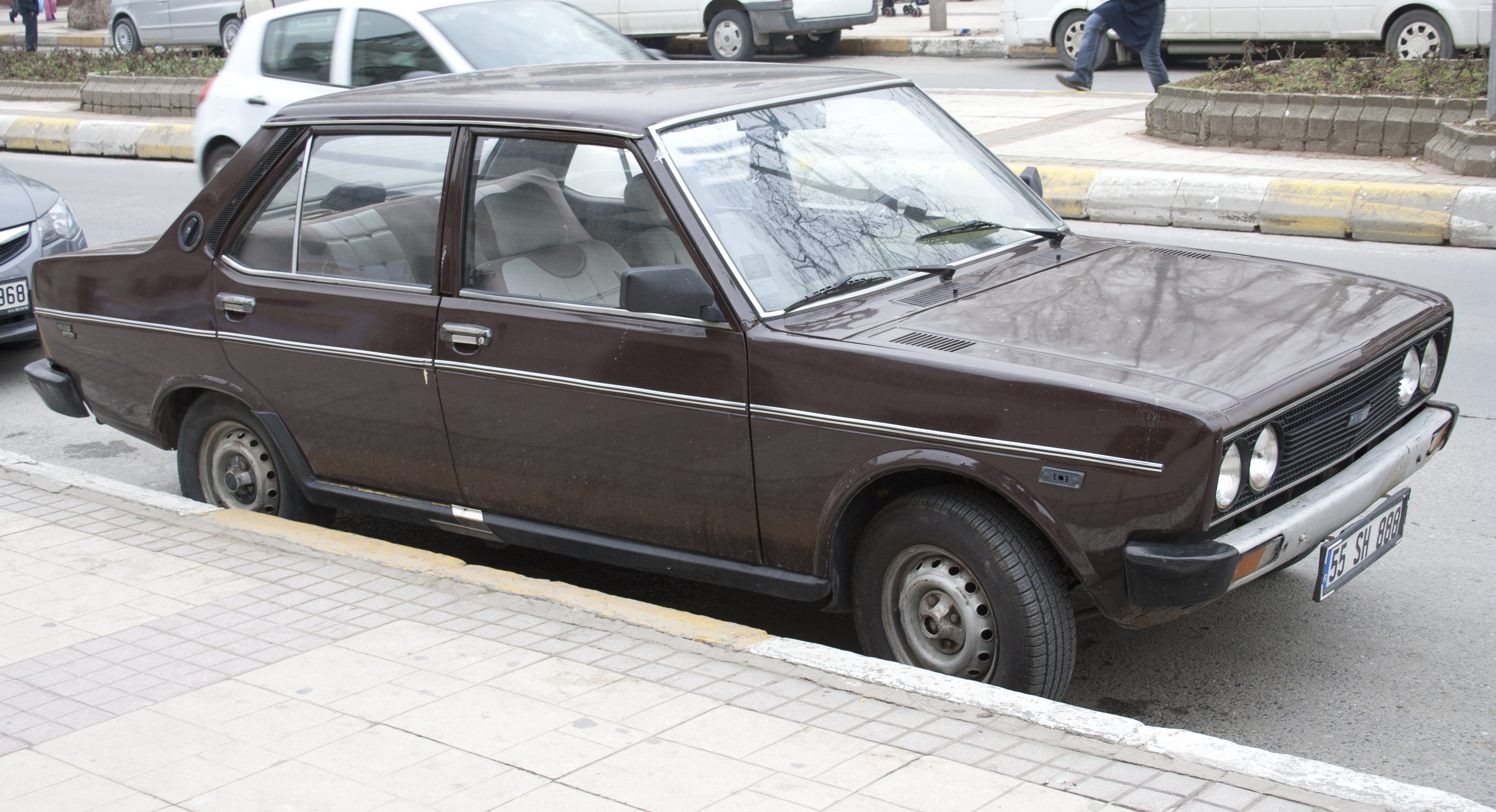
- 1st gen Doğan

Overview
- Manufacturer: Tofaş
- Also called: Tofaş Şahin (entry trim); Tofaş Doğan (upper trim); Tofaş Kartal (station wagon)
- Production: 1977–1988
- Assembly: Turkey: Bursa

Body and chassis
- Class: Family car
- Body style: 4-door saloon 5-door estate
- Layout: FR layout
- Related: Fiat 131

Powertrain
- Engine: Gasoline: 1297 cc 131 A0.000 OHV I4; 1585 cc 131 A1.000 OHV I4
- Transmission: 4-speed manual

Dimensions
- Wheelbase: 2,490 mm (98.0 in)
- Length: 4,316 mm (169.9 in)
- Width: 1,642 mm (64.6 in)
- Height: 1,437 mm (56.6 in)
- Curb weight: 960 kg (2,116 lb)

Chronology
- Predecessor: Tofaş Murat 124 (1971–1977)

In February 1977 the Turkish Tofaş Murat 131 was first introduced, as a near exact replica of the Fiat 131. Originally it was only available with a Solex twin-barrel carbureted 1.3 L pushrod petrol four, producing 70 PS SAE (51 kW) at 5,250 rpm. From 1981 the Şahin ("Falcon") and Kartal names were also in use, with the Kartal ("Eagle") being the station wagon. From this point a 1.6-litre OHV engine was also added to the lineup, producing 75 PS DIN (55 kW) at 5,400 rpm. This largely replaced the smaller 1.3 (now with a claimed 65 PS DIN [48 kW] at 5,400 rpm, with a Weber twin carburetor), which was only retained as a lower priced option for the more basic Şahin version. The single, rounded rectangular headlights of the earlier Murat 131s were replaced with double units. Announced in September 1981 (on sale by October), the new luxurious Doğan model received a five-speed manual transmission. The Doğan also received a fully fabric upholstered interior, a heated rear window, and had the front door vent windows removed. The luggage compartment was fully carpeted and the suspension was adjusted to minimize understeer at high speeds.

The five-speed remained standard only for the Doğan, although it later became an option in the lesser models. From 1983, the Doğan was also set apart by large rectangular headlights while the lesser Şahin and Kartal made do with round twin headlights.

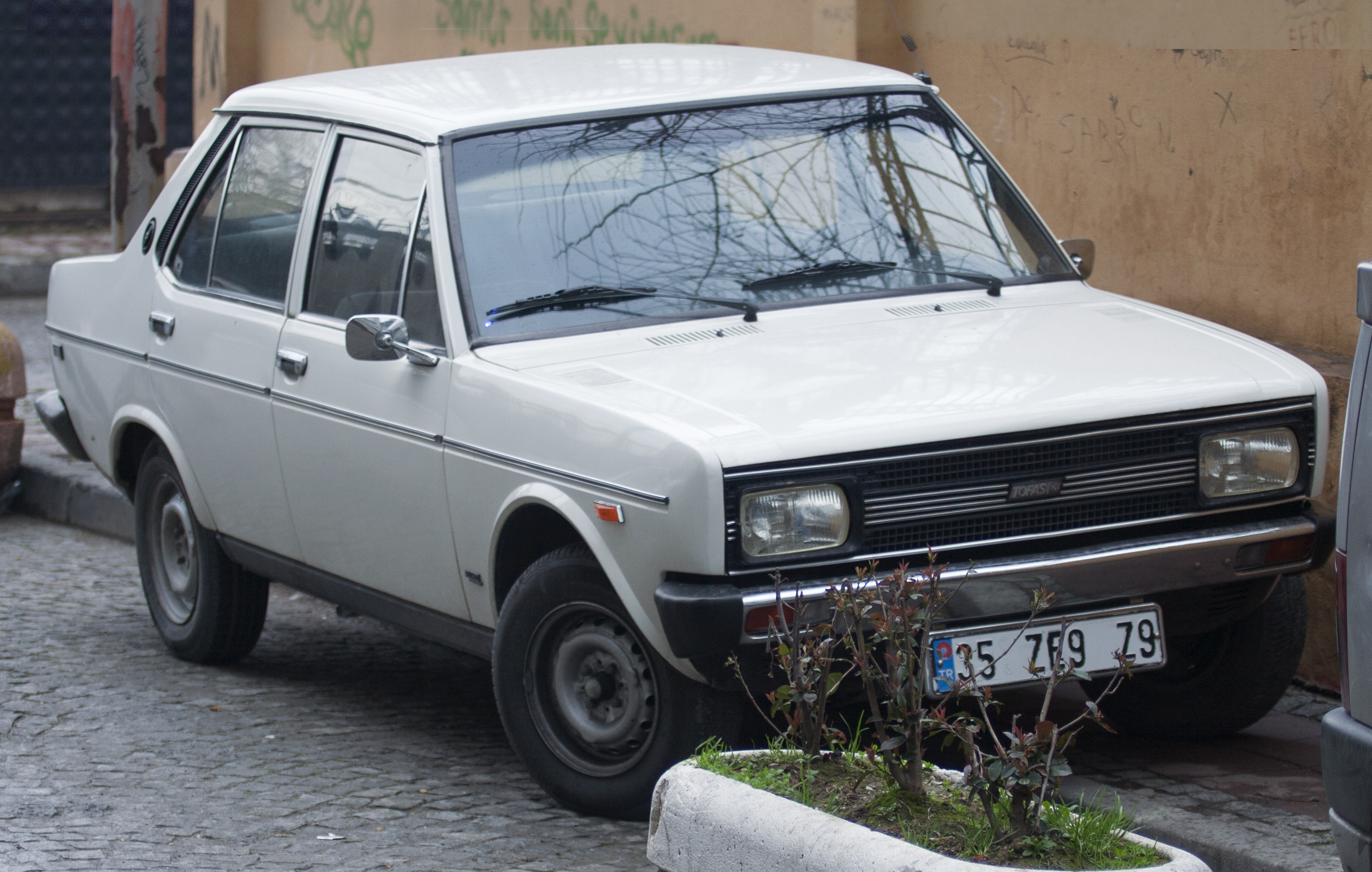
1976-1981 Murat 131 Şahin

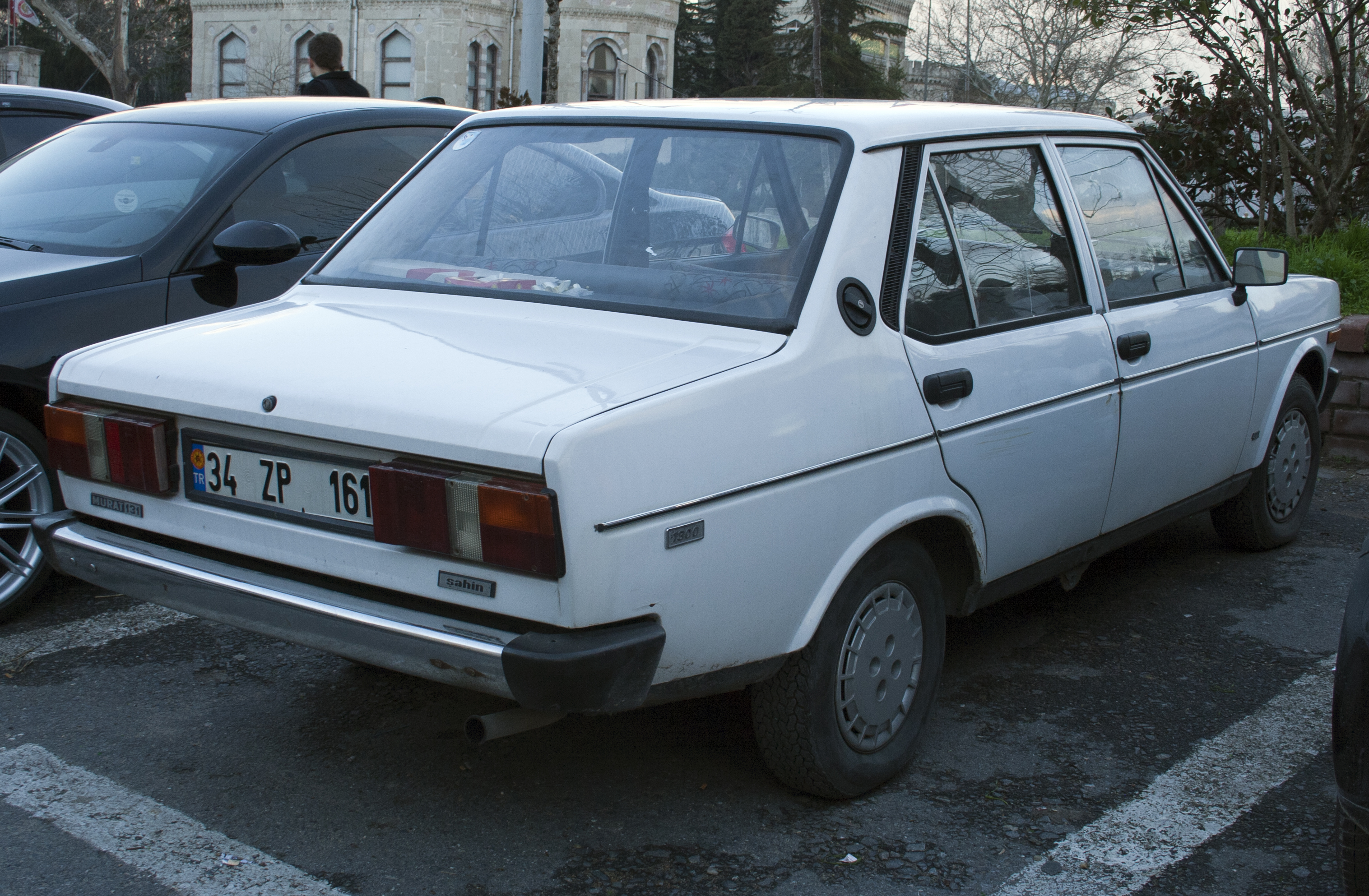
1976-1981 Murat 131 Şahin; rear view

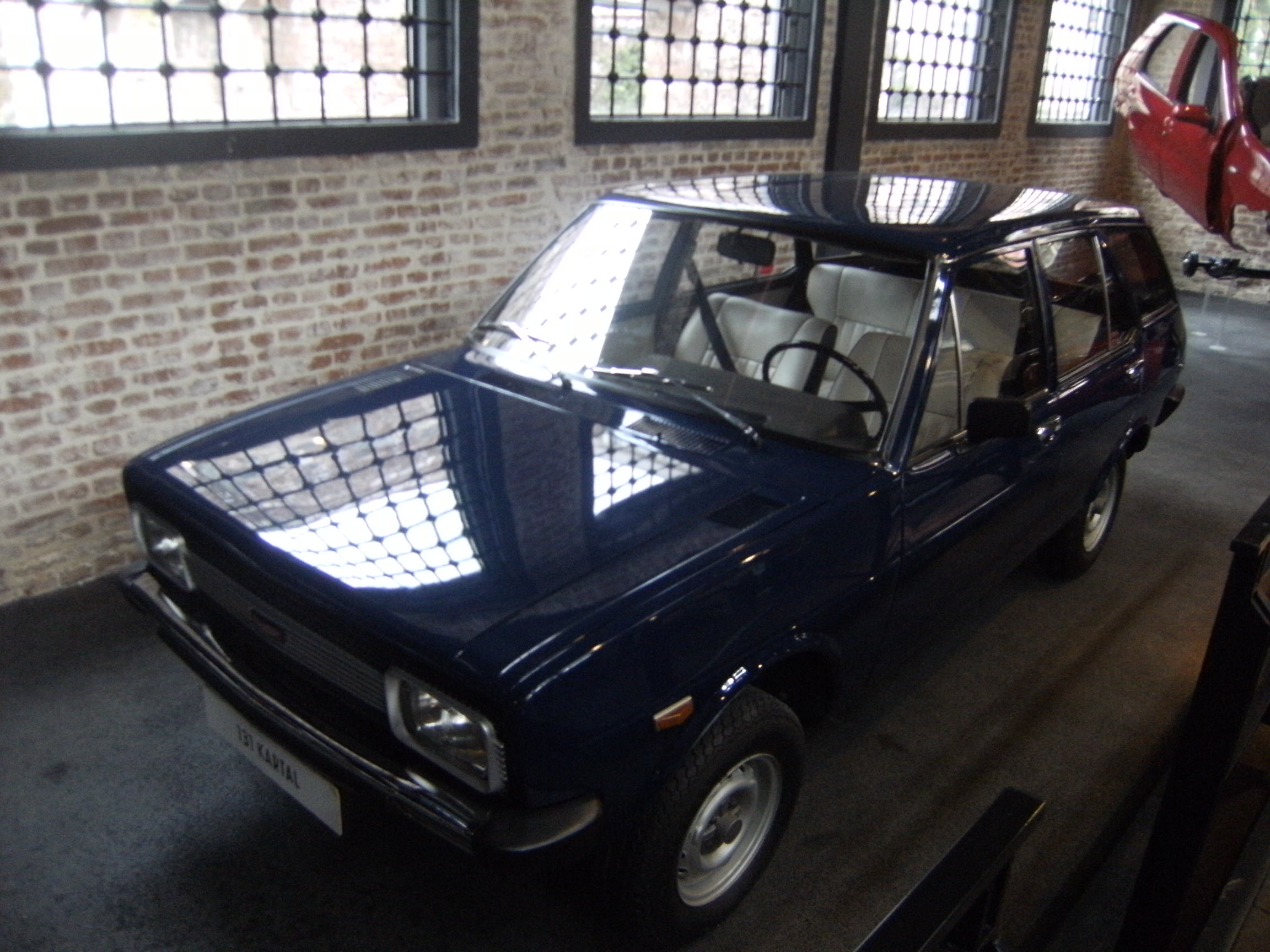
1976-1981 Murat 131 Kartal

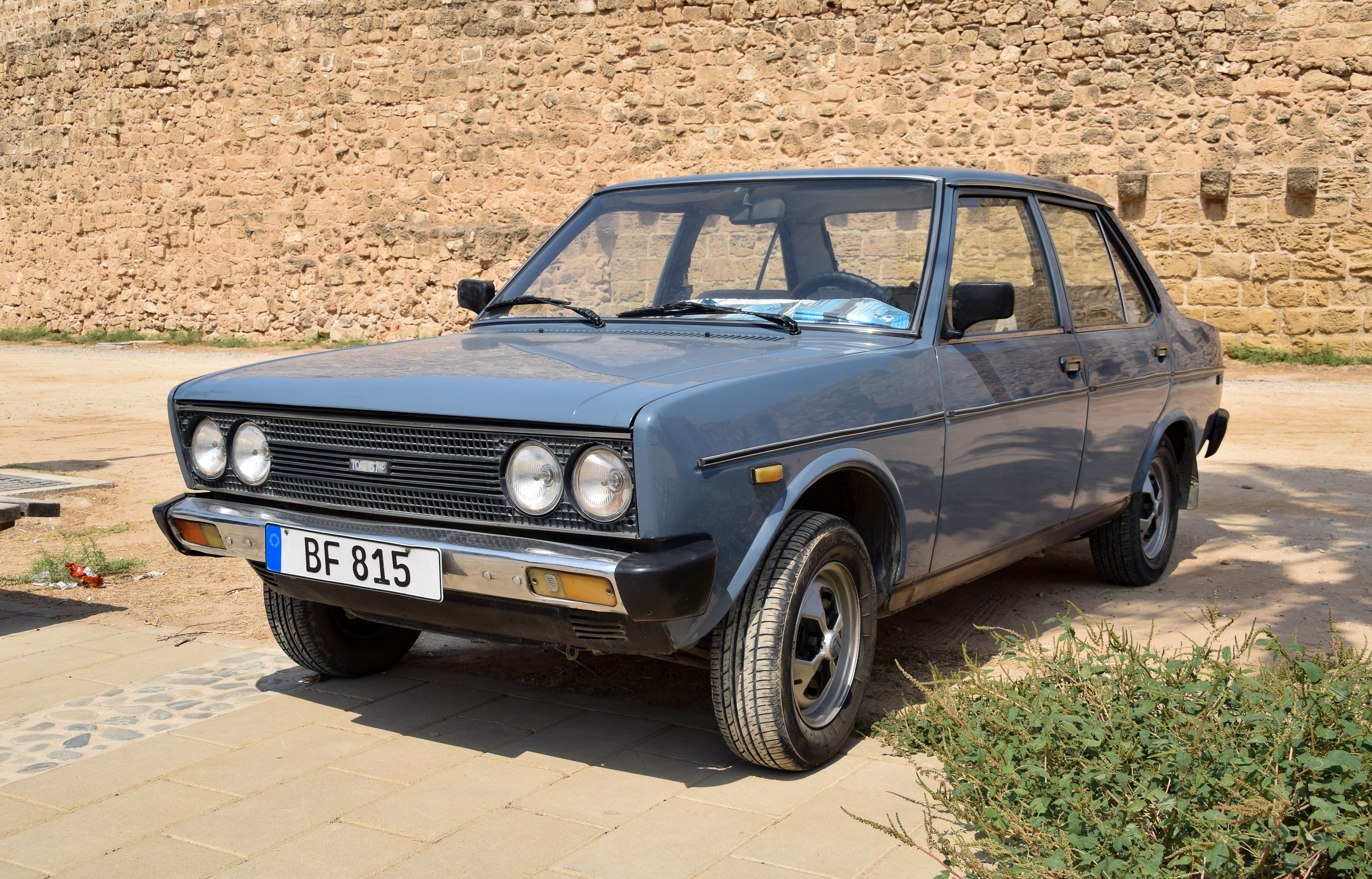
1984-1988 Murat 131 Şahin

== Second generation ==
2nd gen
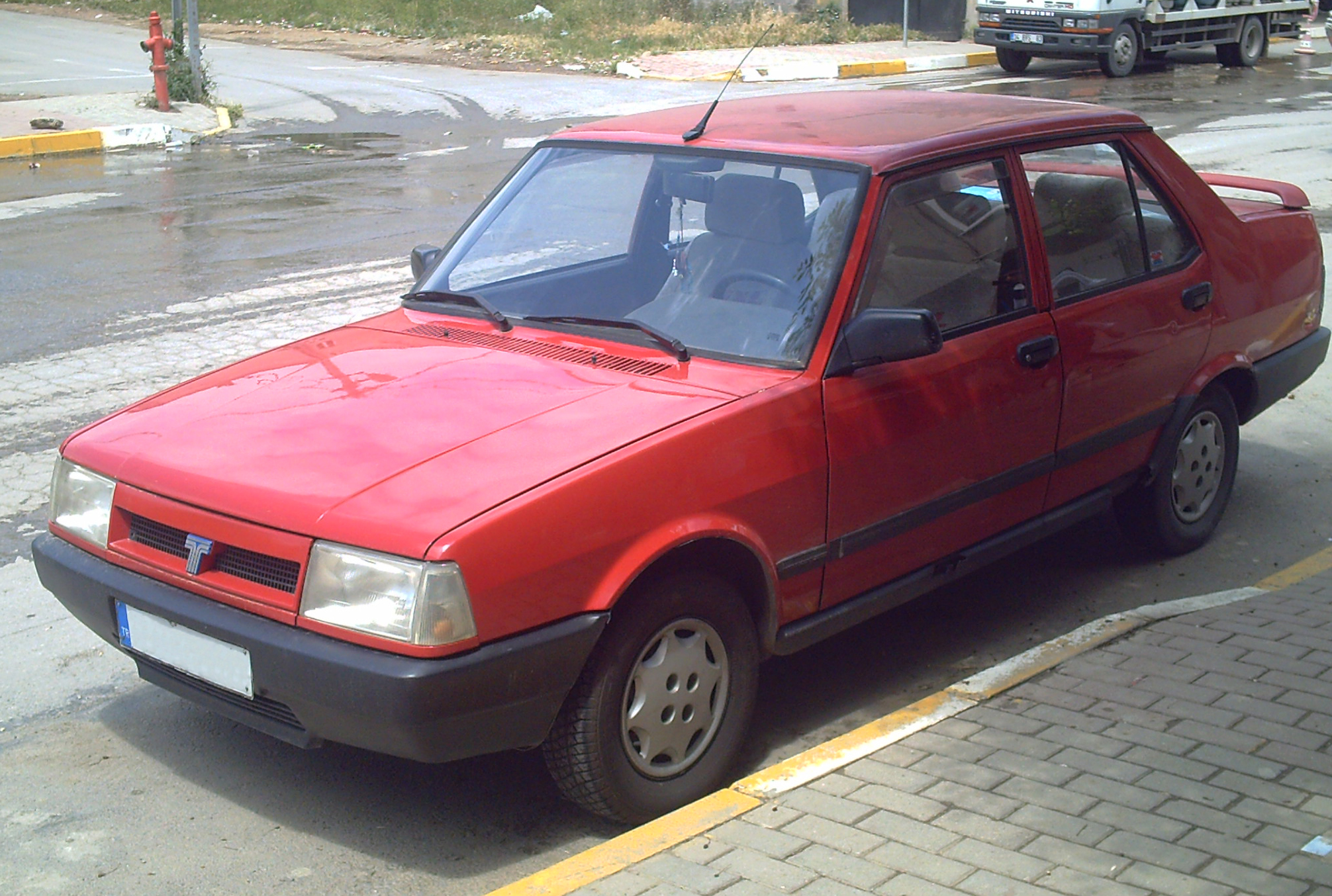
- 2nd gen Doğan

Overview
- Manufacturer: Tofaş
- Also called: Tofaş Doğan; Tofaş Kartal (station wagon); Nasr Sahin Holland DOCC
- Production: 1988–2010
- Assembly: Turkey: Bursa (Tofaş: 1988–2002); Egypt: Cairo (Nasr: 1991–2009); Ethiopia: Addis Ababa (Holland Car: 2006–2010)

Body and chassis
- Class: Family car
- Body style: 4-door saloon 5-door estate
- Layout: FR layout

Powertrain
- Engine: Gasoline: 1372 cc 131 F SOHC I4; 1581 cc 131.D/F3 SOHC I4; 1585 cc 131 A1 OHV I4; Diesel: 1929 cc 149.A1.016 SOHC I4
- Transmission: 5-speed manual

Dimensions
- Wheelbase: 2,490 mm (98.0 in)
- Length: 4,316 mm (169.9 in)
- Width: 1,642 mm (64.6 in)
- Height: 1,437 mm (56.6 in)
- Curb weight: 960 kg (2,116 lb)

Chronology
- Predecessor: Tofaş Murat 131 (1977–1986)

In 1988 the cars received a major aesthetic revision, with a redesigned front and rear resulting in a design reminiscent of the Fiat Regata. The "Murat" portion of the name was still used in some marketing material, but no longer appeared on the car and gradually vanished. The new headlights were large and square, with triangular corner lights which wrap around. The grille has a number of slim vertical crossbars in black plastic, with higher end models receiving some body colored elements at the top of the grille. After the facelift, the Doğan and Şahin sedan models are almost visually identical barring various upper-class trim options on the slightly more luxurious Doğan variant. The Kartal, the station wagon derivation of the design, has a rear body developed locally, with a higher roof than that of Fiat's own 131 Panorama. The interiors underwent a major overhaul as well.

As part of a national project to produce diesel-powered vehicles as a response to rising oil prices, Tofaş began developing a diesel-powered Şahin (and Kartal) in 1985. The engine chosen was Fiat/Lancia's 1.9-litre diesel engine producing 73 PS SAE (54 kW). Production started in January 1988, with sales commencing in May. Imports of these engines did not attract import duties, but a single imported engine still cost more than an entire, gasoline-powered Şahin. The price of a new, diesel-engined Şahin was 75 percent higher than the gasoline-powered model. Most sales were to professional users, for whom the lower fuel costs would offset the massive difference in purchase price. However, due to the slow sales, promised local parts supplies never materialized and owners of the diesel-powered cars experienced significant problems in keeping their cars on the road. Sales ended in October 1989, after only 820 examples had been sold; many surviving examples have had the Fiat engines replaced with locally manufactured Isuzu units due to the parts supply problems.

In August 1994 (for the 1995 model year), the range received a facelift with a new grille (body colored for all but the lowest specced versions). The grille had a prominent frame, with the opening containing a stylized "T" and a slim crossbar. The Doğan SLX also received power steering. For 1996 the cars were provided with new SOHC engines from the Fiat Tempra (an engine that was first designed for the Fiat 128) in two versions: a 1.4 L with 78 PS (57 kW) at 5,500 rpm (only for the Şahin), and a 1.6 L with 86 PS (63 kW) at 5,800 rpm which was available in all models. The Şahin no longer received the 1.4 in Turkey after a while, instead being fitted with an 82 PS (60 kW) version of the 1.6. Later the grille received a circular central motif, containing the "T" logo.

In 1998, the "Kartal Kargo" was introduced. This was a two-seater panel van version of the wagon, akin to Fiat's own Marengo line. The Kartal Kargo can manage a 600 kg (1,300 lb) payload. The rear windows were plated and most trim details were in black plastic, but the Kargo did receive standard power steering.

In 2002 the range received another minor facelift, but this year also heralded the end of Turkish sales as they were now only produced for export, usually in CKD form. Power outputs of catalyzed engines also decreased to 72 PS (53 kW) at 6,000 rpm and 80 PS (59 kW) at 5,750 rpm respectively. By this time the four-speed transmission was no longer available. In 2005 they were introduced with single point electronic fuel injection. Turkish production was gradually shifted to Egypt. In 2006 assembly was also commenced by DOCC in Ethiopia where it continued on a small scale until 2010 (see more below).

Tofaş Şahin was used as standard patrol car by General Directorate of Security and Gendarmerie General Command, along with Renault 12 Toros in 1990s to early-2000s until they replaced by Fiat Doblo and Ford Transit Connect.

=== Decline ===
The Şahin, Doğan, and Kartal all shared the same rear wheel drive platform with longitudinal engine placement, MacPherson design suspension system for the front wheels and a live axle for the rear. Their major selling point was their low price, robust design, and its low-maintenance cost, largely due to its near universal popularity during the 1980s and 1990s. However, this design resulted in a very cramped passenger compartment as the gearbox, fuel tank and shaft tunnel occupied a lot of space. Due to its roots as a mid 1970s Italian passenger vehicle, the design lacked various safety equipment standards including ABS, passenger airbags, and traction control. Its popularity in Turkey started waning in the mid-1990s as modern imported cars flooded the market. Most 131-based Tofaş have been converted to use LPG fuel as gasoline prices soared and made the cars financially unfeasible in their original state. It was the de facto taxi of Turkey before it was deemed unsuitable for taxi use due to Turkey's ongoing negotiations to enter the EU, and the ensuing regulations implemented. The models have been replaced by the Fiat Siena (produced locally as Fiat Albea) series.

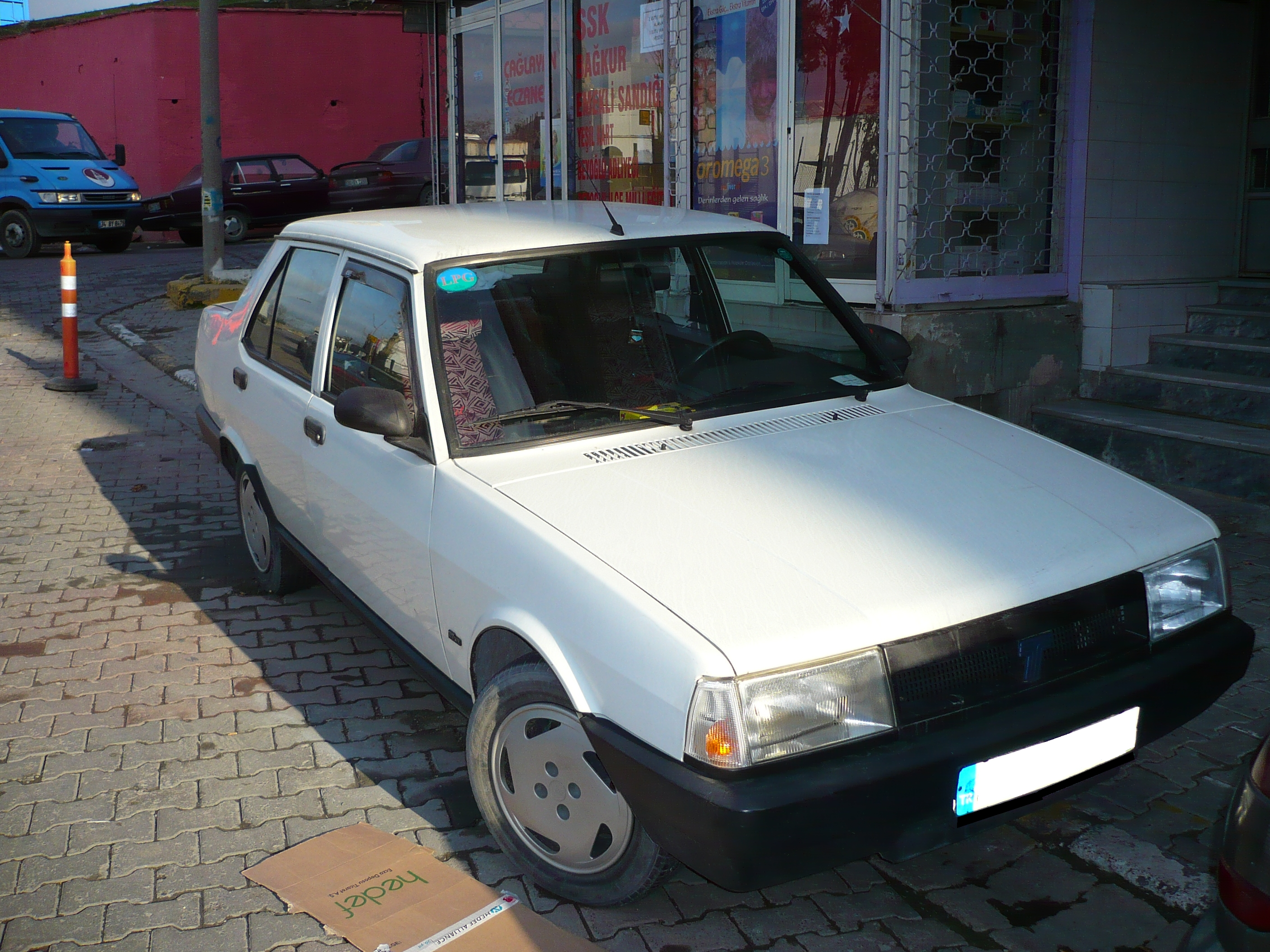
1988–1995 Şahin

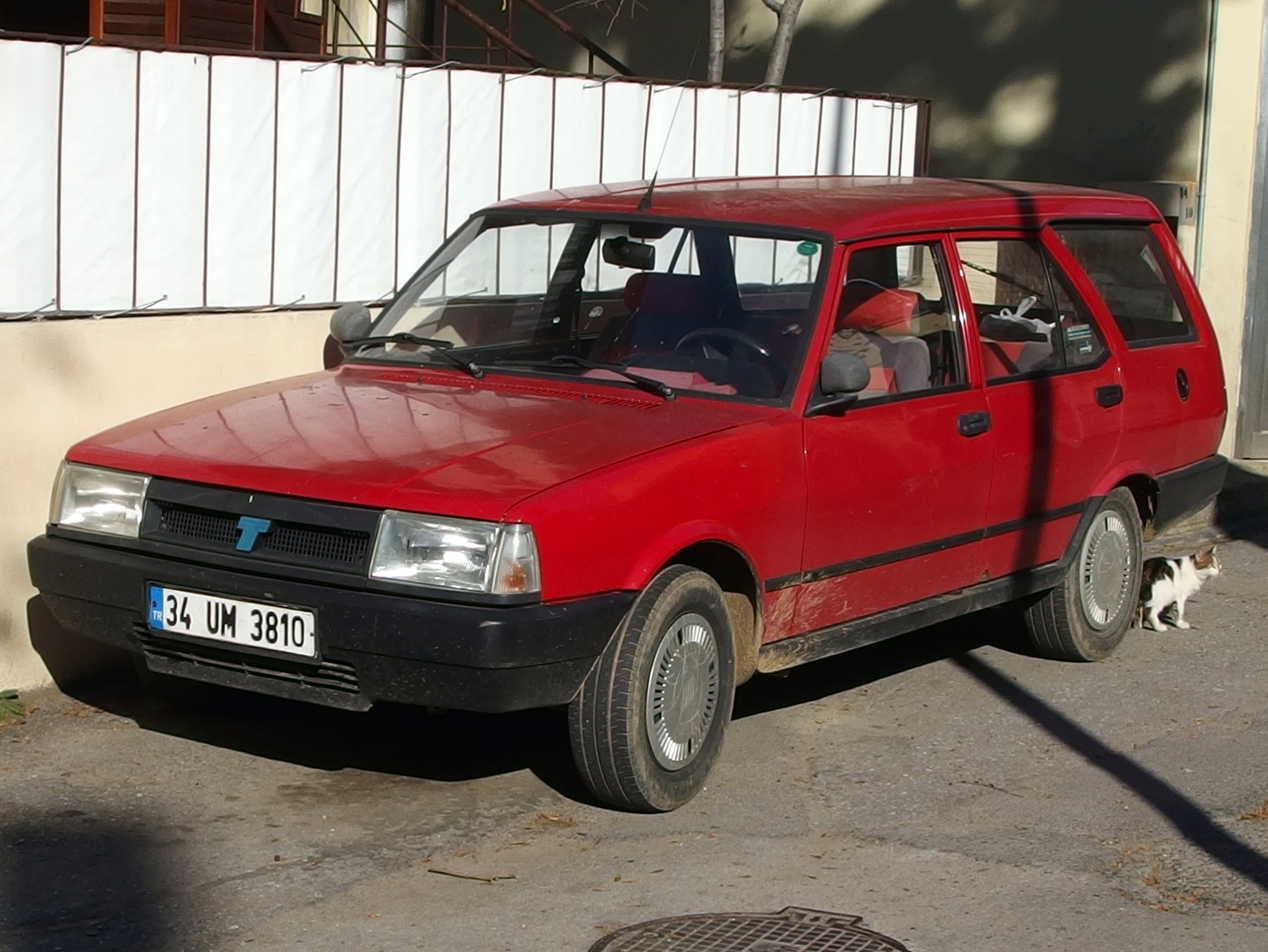
1988–1995 Kartal

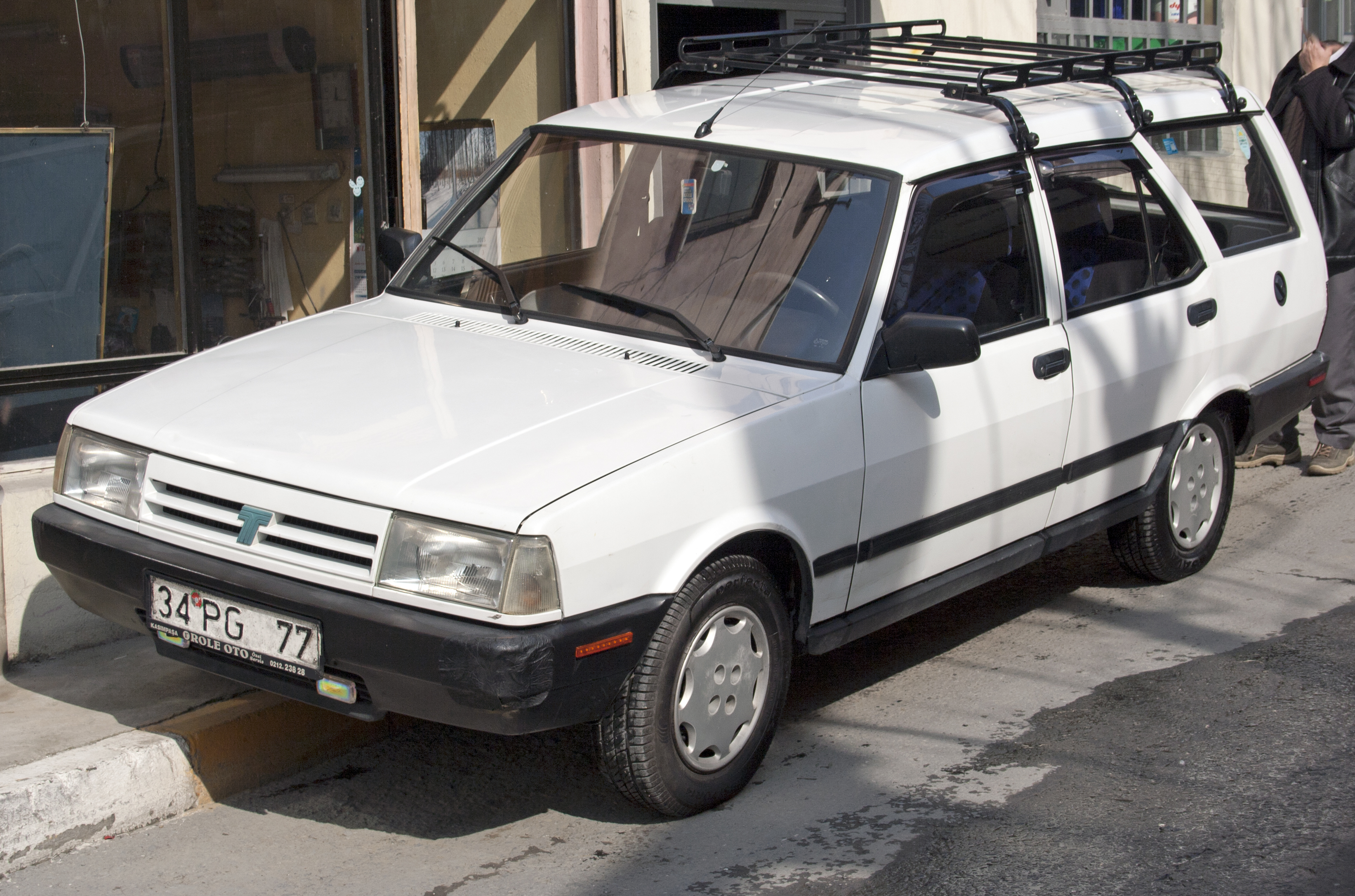
1995–2003 Kartal

== International ==
The Tofaş Şahin, Doğan and Kartal were also exported to Azerbaijan, Georgia, Kazakhstan, Kyrgyzstan, Libya, Macedonia, Romania, Syria, Tunisia, Turkmenistan, Uzbekistan as well as China. Right-hand drive models were produced for the Northern Cyprus market.

=== Nasr variant ===
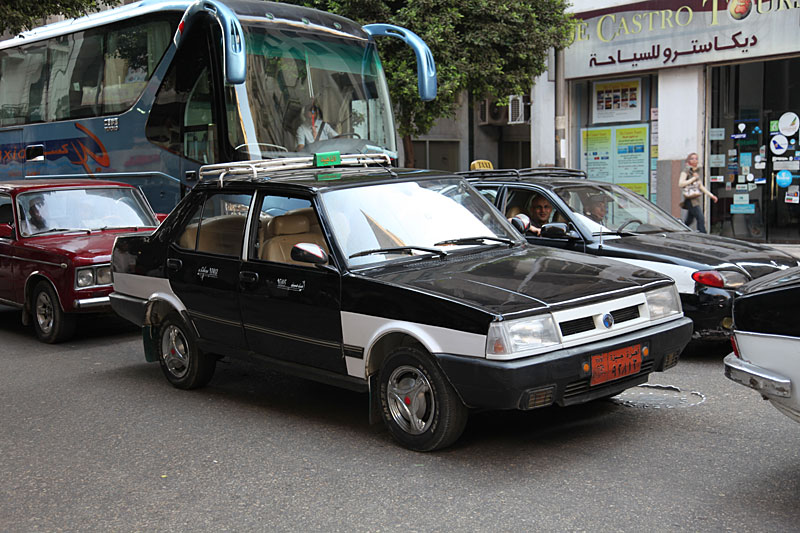
Nasr Şahin

Türk Otomobil Fabrikası A.Ş. produced the Şahin and its siblings under license in Egypt in large quantities from 1991, with assembly carried out by the state-owned Nasr car company. The range underwent the same changes as did Turkish market models, although the Kartal was taken out of production in 2003 and the Doğan was eventually replaced by the Şahin 1600 SL - with the 1400 S beneath it in the lineup. Production was gradually shifted to Egypt, with local parts content reaching 45% by 2006. With the winding down of the Nasr company in 2009, Egyptian production ended.

=== DOCC ===
In 2006 the Tofaş Şahin was put into production in Addis Ababa, Ethiopia, by the Holland Car Company, a joint venture between a firm from the Netherlands called Trento Engineering and the local firm of Ethio-Holland. Their version of the Şahin is called the DOCC, which comes from the term Dutch Overseas Car Company and comes with the OHC 1.6 L (1,581 cc) powerplant. After the end at El Nasr, Ethiopian production came to a halt in 2010.
