= Fiat Tipo (Type 160) =

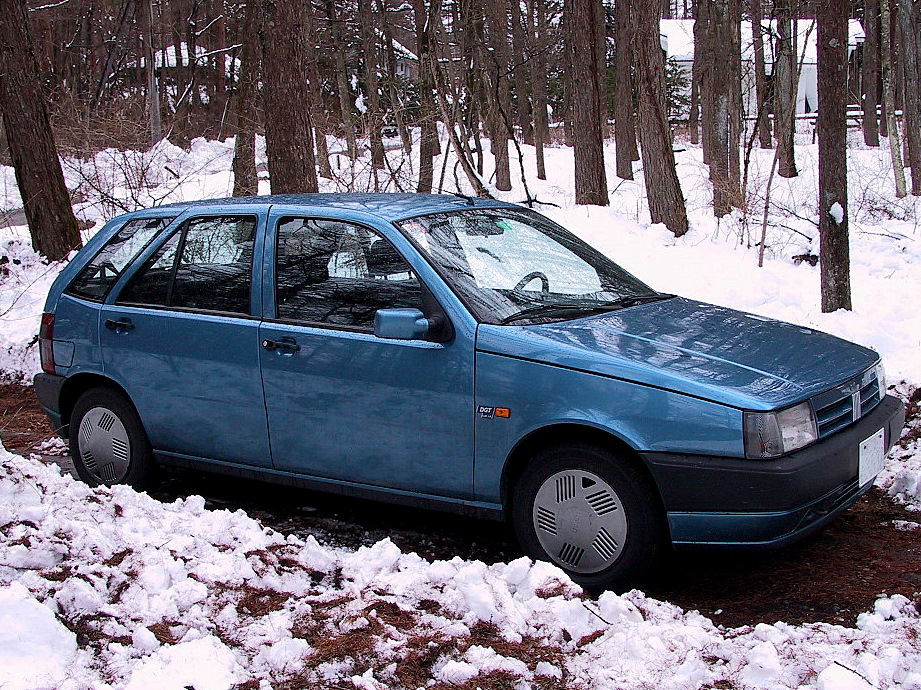

Overview
- Manufacturer: Fiat Auto
- Production: 1988–1995 (Italy); 1995–1997 (Brazil); 1995–2000 (Turkey)
- Assembly: Italy: Cassino Plant, Piedimonte San Germano; Italy: Pomigliano d'Arco plant, Campania (1989–1990); Brazil: Betim; Turkey: Bursa (Tofaş)
- Designer: Ercole Spada at I.DE.A Institute

Body and chassis
- Class: Small family car (C)
- Body style: 3/5-door hatchback
- Layout: front-engine, front-wheel-drive
- Platform: Type Two (Tipo Due)
- Related: Fiat Tempra; Fiat Coupé; Alfa Romeo 145 and 146; Lancia Delta

Powertrain
- Engine: petrol: 1.1 L I4; 1.4 L I4; 1.6 L I4; 1.7 L I4; 1.8 L 8V/16V I4; 2.0 L 8V/16V I4; diesel: 1.7 L I4; 1.9 L I4; 1.9 L turbo I4
- Transmission: 5-speed manual; CVT (Selecta); 4-speed automatic

Dimensions
- Wheelbase: 2,540 mm (100.0 in)
- Length: 3,958 mm (155.8 in)
- Width: 1,700 mm (66.9 in)
- Height: 1,445 mm (56.9 in)
- Curb weight: 1,020–1,230 kg (2,250–2,710 lb)

Chronology
- Predecessor: Fiat Ritmo
- Successor: Fiat Bravo and Brava

The Fiat Tipo (Type 160) is a compact car, designed by the I.DE.A Institute design house, and produced by the Italian manufacturer Fiat between 1988 and 1995.

The Tipo was initially available only as a five-door hatchback. The car was made entirely out of galvanized body panels to avoid rust, and was built on a completely new Fiat platform, which was later also used in Alfa Romeo and Lancia models. The dashboard design was by Rodolfo Bonetto.

It also stood out because of its boxy styling that gave it innovative levels of packaging, rear passenger room being greater than that in a rear wheel drive Ford Sierra, but in a car that was of a similar size to the smaller Ford Escort. This type of design was comparable to the smaller Fiat Uno, which was launched five years before the Tipo.

In 1989, the Tipo won the European Car of the Year award and the 1989 Semperit Irish Car of the Year in Ireland. The car was also built in Brazil and Turkey.

== Variants ==
Unveiled in January 1988, the Tipo went on sale in Europe during June 1988, and on the right hand drive market in the United Kingdom from 16 July 1988, initially base (i.e.), DGT, (early Italian market DGT models were badged as 'digit', presumably in recognition of the digital dash, but this was quickly changed to DGT after a dispute over ownership of the name, leading to confusion about whether the model was diesel powered) S, SX and 16v trim levels were available. "Tipo" is Italian for "type".

Power from 58 to 148 PS (43 to 109 kW; 57 to 146 bhp) came from 1.1, 1.4, 1.6, 1.7, 1.8, 1.8 16v, 2.0, and 2.0 16v petrol engines, as well as a 1.7 diesel, 1.9 diesel, and 1.9 turbodiesel.

The 1.1 base engine was widely regarded as underpowered for the car, which was otherwise roomy for five adults and with above average equipment. This version was never sold in the United Kingdom. The top of the range was the 2.0 Sedicivalvole (16 valves).

The Sedicivalvole gained its engine from the Lancia Thema, and with a much smaller and lighter bodyshell to house it, this power unit brought superb performance and handling, and a top speed of around 130 mph (210 km/h), which made it faster than the Volkswagen Golf GTI of that era. The market in the United Kingdom initially received only the 1.4 and 1.6 versions of the Tipo, with the 1.8 and 2.0 petrol engines and the diesel powered units not being imported until the beginning of the 1990s.

The smaller Uno achieved remarkable success in that market throughout the 1980s, reaching its peak with over 40,000 sales in 1988. Both Fiat and the motoring press had high hopes that the Tipo would replicate this triumph, but sales fell short of expectations.

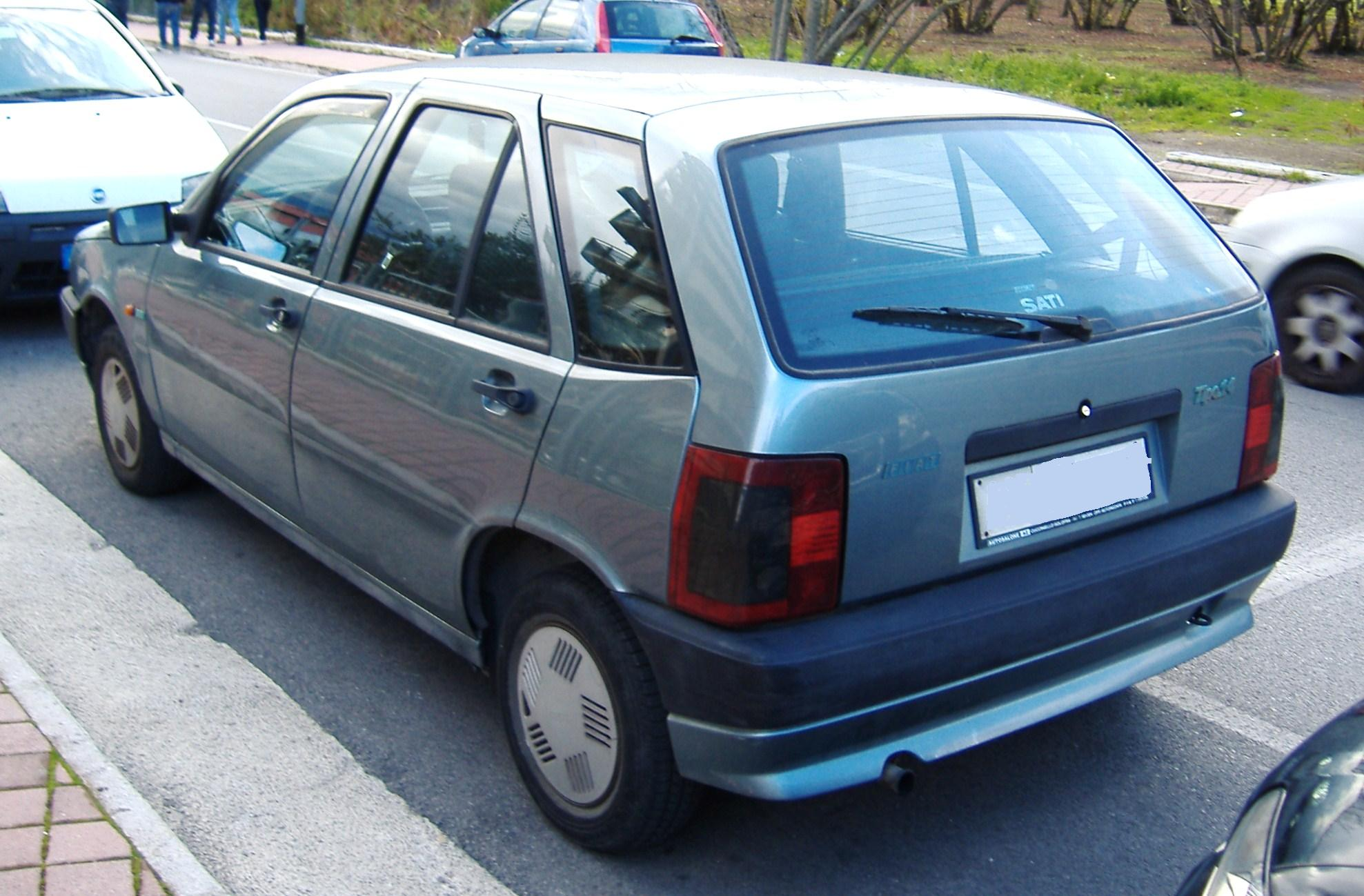
Five-door Tipo 1.4, rear view

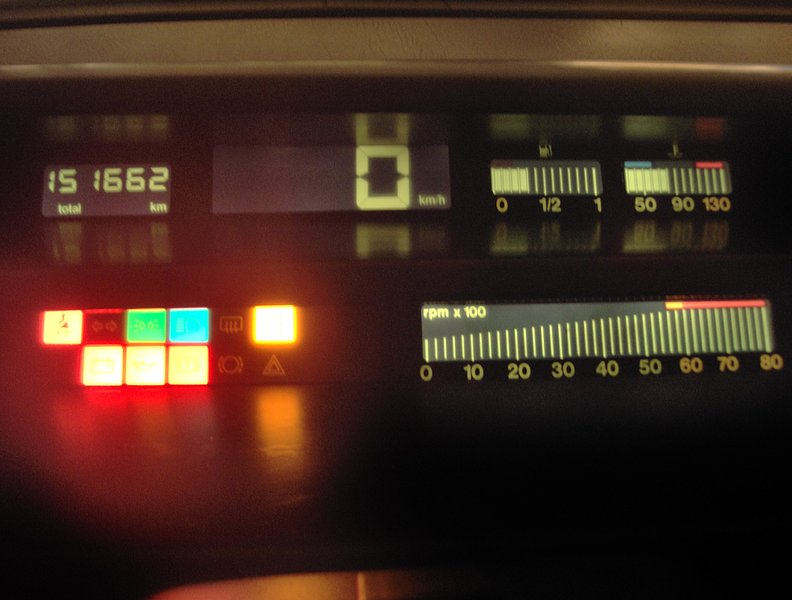
The DGT models had digital instruments

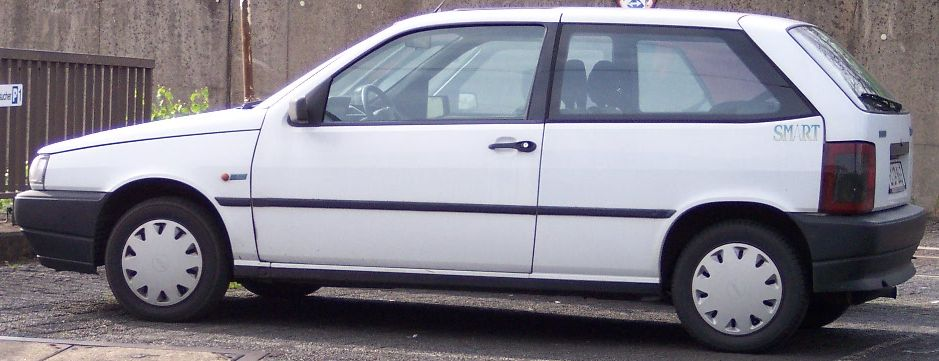
At the 1993 facelift, the 3-door Tipo was introduced

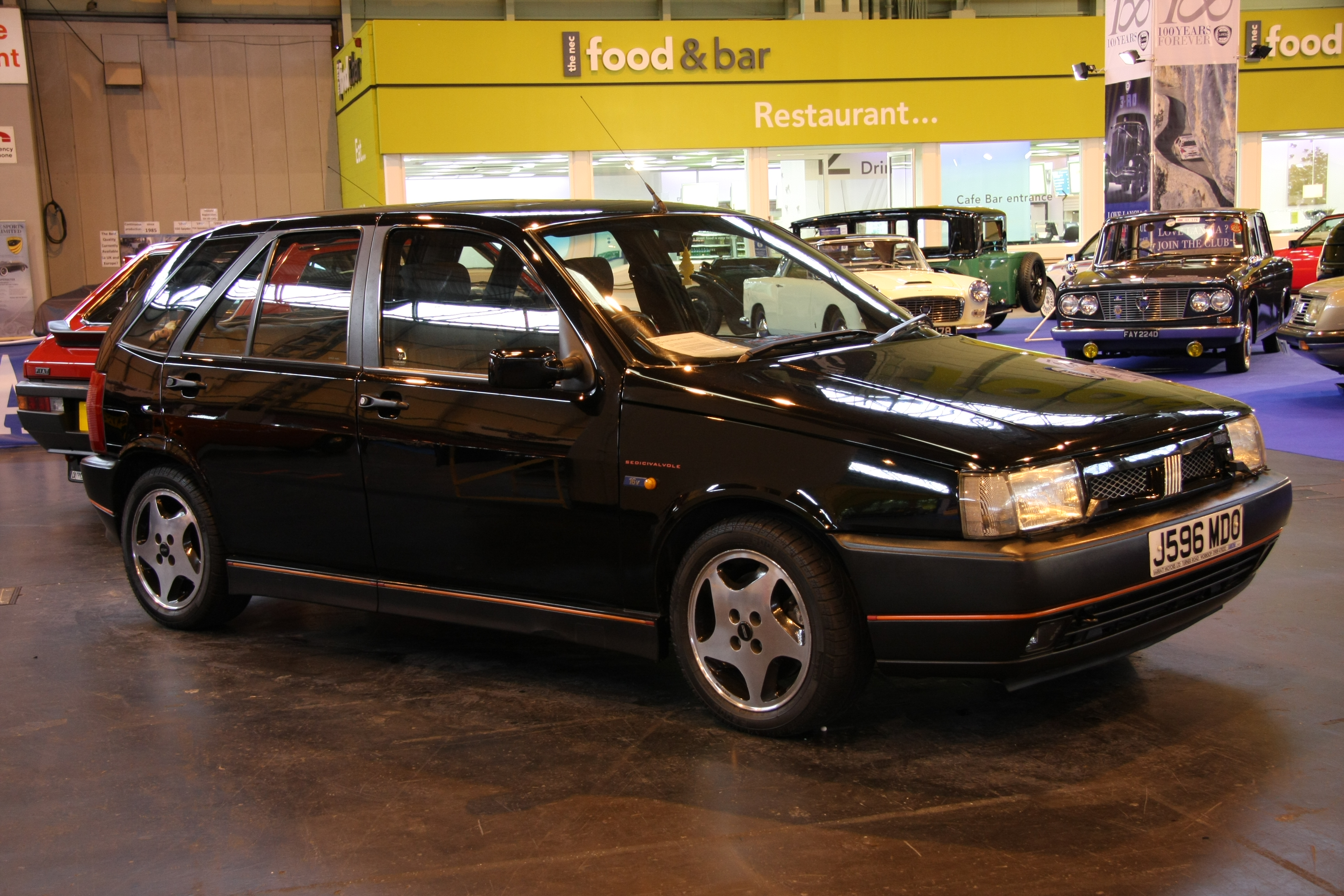
Fiat Tipo Sedicivalvole (UK)

The Tipo was facelifted in 1993, and a three-door version was added, as well as minor exterior changes (the two evolutions of the car can be differentiated by their slightly different radiator grilles and headlamps) and improved specifications; safety features like stiffer bodyshells, driver's airbag, and side impact bars were added to the range. This included the new S, SX, and SLX trim levels, as well as a new eight valve 2.0 GT model.

The Italian Tipo production ceased in the summer of 1995 when it was replaced by the three-door Fiat Bravo and five-door Fiat Brava. The Tempra saloon and estate (station wagon) were replaced by the Marea in 1996. The Bravo and Brava were strong sellers throughout Europe, but the Marea was a disappointment in most markets.

It was a reasonably strong seller in the United Kingdom, initially winning plaudits for its innovative and practical design, as well as its good handling. It was originally sold with only 1.4 and 1.6 petrol engines, the 16 valve 1.8 and 2.0 engines with fuel injection became available there in the early 1990s.

The digital dashboard of higher end models proved to be controversial and unreliable.

The car launched into a favourable market in the United Kingdom, where none of the "big three" carmakers (Ford, Vauxhall, and Austin Rover) had launched an all new car of this size for at least four years. However, these three marques all had new Tipo sized products within three years, and increased competition reduced the Tipo's sales.

Its fortunes outside Italy also suffered in the beginning of the 1990s, as it was launched around the same time as France's Renault 19, and was soon followed by host of other new rivals, including the Citroën ZX.

The final two years (1994 and 1995) saw a significant increase in sales, but these were mostly of the low priced 1.4 litre models.

=== Production elsewhere ===
In Brazil, the Tipo had been imported from Italy beginning in September 1993. It was the best selling import car in 1994 and 1995, reaching fifth place in overall sales in 1995. The imported Tipo was available with three different trims which were closely associated with its engines: the basic 1.6 i.e., the luxurious 2.0 litre (eight valve), and the sporty two-litre, sixteen valve Sedicivalvole. Seventeen 1.7-litre examples were also brought in; these were all in Estoril Blue color and received complete equipment. Numerous fires began to be reported in Italian-made Tipos in June 1995, severely damaging the car's reputation.

Local production began in December 1995, in a single trim level. It had a 1.6-litre, eight-valve engine with multi point fuel injection, which offered a 10 PS (7.4 kW) increase compared to the old 1.6 litre i.e., producing 92 PS (68 kW). It became the first Brazilian made vehicle to offer a driver's side airbag, when one became optional in 1996. However, the locally made version was more expensive than the original (in part because many parts still had to be imported); combined with the negative publicity surrounding the engine fires, sales for 1996 dropped by 83 percent instead of doubling as planned. With production volumes 95 percent lower than planned, Fiat were forced to end production early. On March 9, 1997, Fiat announced that production would cease in 60 days, while the closely sized Tempra remained in production until 1999.

It was also built in Turkey, by Tofaş. The Turkish built cars generally did not feature catalytic converters and some thus have marginally more power than the models listed in the table beneath. The Turkish cars also have a small "Tofaş" logo on the bottom right side of the bootlid; production there continued at least until 2000.

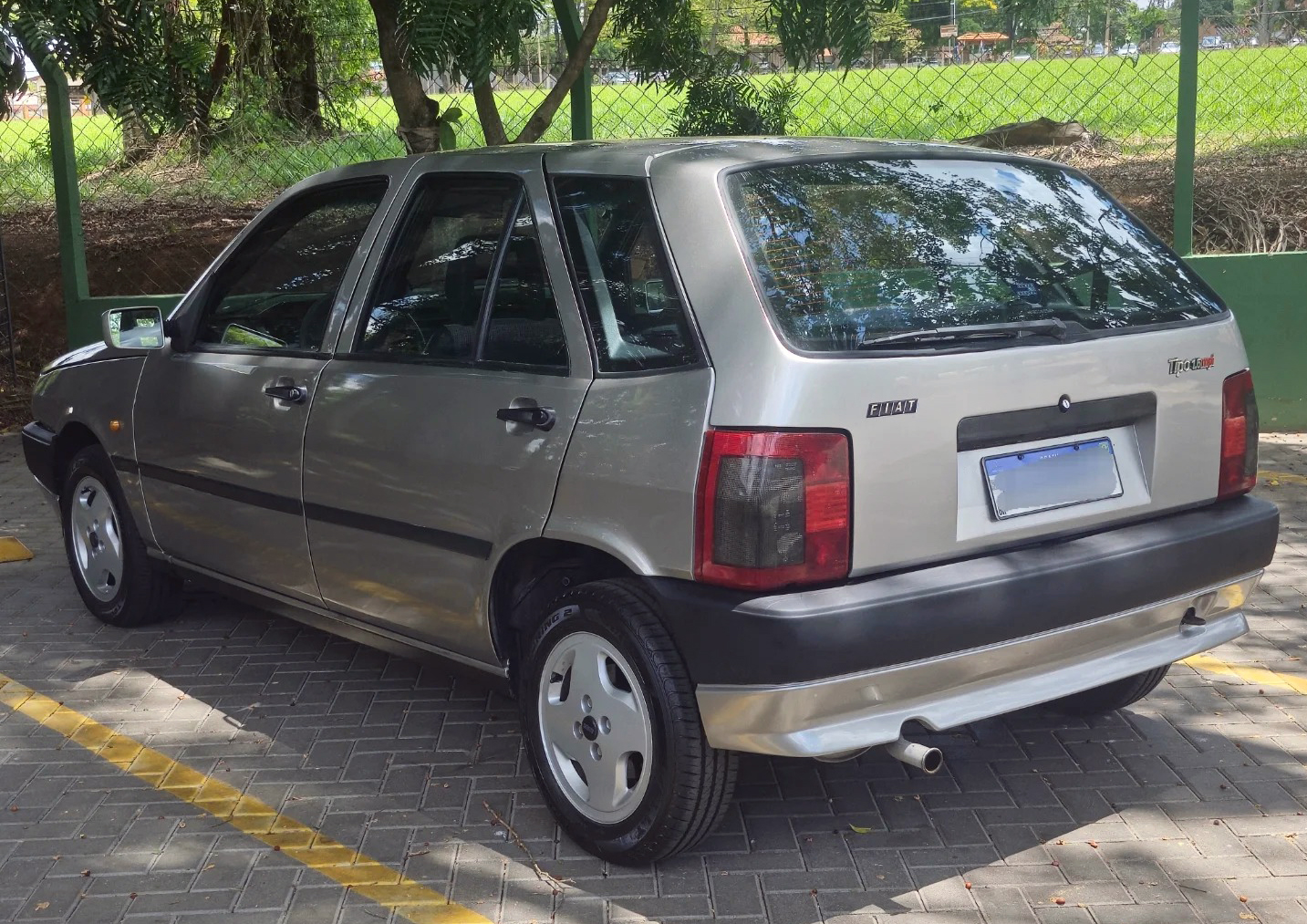
1997 Fiat Tipo 1.6 mpi (Brazil)

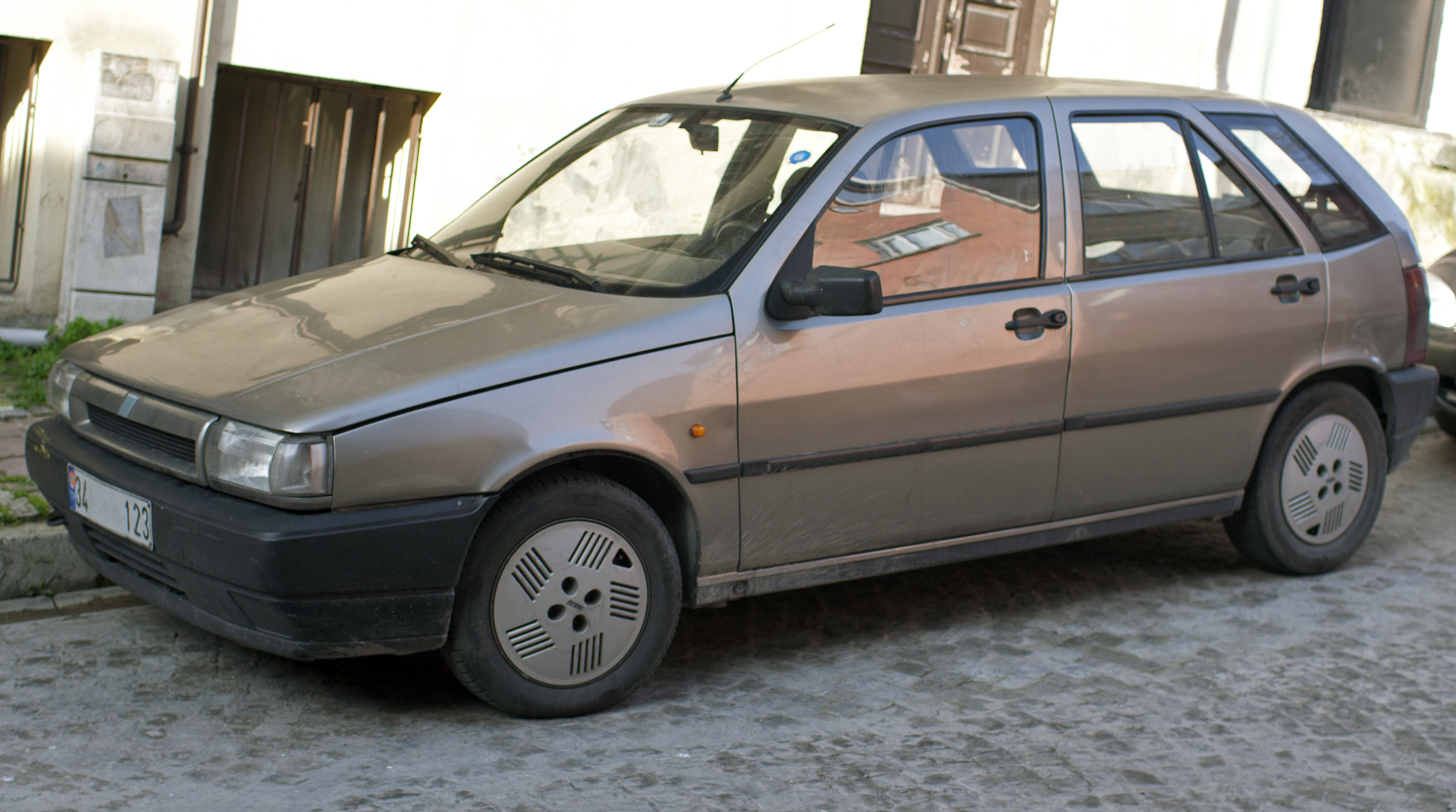
Second series Tipo (Tofaş-built)

=== Petrol ===
Model	Engine	Cat	Displ	Power	Torque
1.1 FIRE	160A3.000	—	1,108 cc	56 PS (41 kW; 55 hp) at 5,500 rpm	89 N⋅m (66 lb⋅ft) at 2,900 rpm
1.4 i.e., S	160A1.046		1,372 cc	70 PS (51 kW; 69 hp) at 6,000 rpm	106 N⋅m (78 lb⋅ft) at 3,000 rpm
1.4 i.e., S	159A2.000	—	1,372 cc	78 PS (57 kW; 77 hp) at 6,000 rpm	108 N⋅m (80 lb⋅ft) at 2,900 rpm
1.4, DGT	160A1.000	—	1,372 cc	71 PS (52 kW; 70 hp) at 6,000 rpm	105 N⋅m (77 lb⋅ft) at 3,750 rpm
1.4, DGT	160A1.048		1,372 cc	72 PS (53 kW; 71 hp) at 6,000 rpm	105 N⋅m (77 lb⋅ft) at 3,750 rpm
1.6 i.e.	159A3.046		1,581 cc	80 PS (59 kW; 79 hp) at 6,000 rpm	128 N⋅m (94 lb⋅ft) at 3,000 rpm
1.6 i.e.	159A3.048		1,581 cc	76 PS (56 kW; 75 hp) at 6,000 rpm (ECE)	124 N⋅m (91 lb⋅ft) at 3,000 rpm
1.6 DGT	160A2.000	—	1,581 cc	86 PS (63 kW; 85 hp) at 5,800 rpm	132 N⋅m (97 lb⋅ft) at 2,900 rpm
1.6 DGT	160A2.000	—	1,581 cc	82 PS (60 kW; 81 hp) at 6,000 rpm (ECE)	130 N⋅m (96 lb⋅ft) at 2,900 rpm
1.6 i.e.	149.C2.046		1,585 cc	90 PS (66 kW; 89 hp) at 6,250 rpm	122 N⋅m (90 lb⋅ft) at 4,250 rpm
1.6 mpi 1995–1997: South America only	SEVEL		1,580 cc	92 PS (68 kW; 91 hp) at 5,750 rpm	136 N⋅m (100 lb⋅ft) at 3,000 rpm
1.7 i.e. or 1.6 S i.e. 1994–1996: Export model Germany, Greece, Brazil (17 sold), Turkey			1,676 cc	90 PS (66 kW; 89 hp) at 5,900 rpm	130 N⋅m (96 lb⋅ft) at 3,000 rpm
1.8 i.e.	159A4.000	—	1,756 cc	110 PS (81 kW; 108 hp) at 6,000 rpm	142 N⋅m (105 lb⋅ft) at 2,500 rpm
1.8 i.e. 16V Sedicivalvole	160A5.000	—	1,756 cc	138 PS (101 kW; 136 hp) at 6,250 rpm	167 N⋅m (123 lb⋅ft) at 4,600 rpm
2.0 i.e.	159A6.046		1,995 cc	115 PS (85 kW; 113 hp) at 5,750 rpm	159 N⋅m (117 lb⋅ft) at 3,300 rpm
2.0 i.e.	159A5.046		1,995 cc	109 PS (80 kW; 108 hp) at ? rpm	? at ? rpm
2.0 i.e. 16V Sedicivalvole	160A8.046		1,995 cc	148 PS (109 kW; 146 hp) at 6,250 rpm	173 N⋅m (128 lb⋅ft) at 5,000 rpm
2.0 i.e. 16V Sport	836A3.000		1,995 cc	142 PS (104 kW; 140 hp) at 6,000 rpm	180 N⋅m (133 lb⋅ft) at 4,500 rpm (CEE)

=== Diesel ===
Model	Engine	Displacement	Power	Torque
1.7 D, DS	149B4.000	1,697 cc	58 PS (43 kW; 57 hp) at 4,600 rpm	100 N⋅m (74 lb⋅ft) at 2,900 rpm
1.9 DS DGT	160A7.000	1,929 cc	65 PS (48 kW; 64 hp) at 4,600 rpm	119 N⋅m (88 lb⋅ft) at 2,000 rpm
1.9 T.ds, DSX	850A6.000	1,929 cc	92 PS (68 kW; 91 hp) at 4,100 rpm	190 N⋅m (140 lb⋅ft) at 2,400 rpm

== Derivatives ==
The Tipo platform spawned nine more cars. The first of these was the Yugo Sana/Zastava Florida in November 1988, followed by the Lancia Dedra sedan in April 1989 and the Fiat Tempra in February 1990. The sporting Alfa Romeo 155 sedan, the coupé Fiat Coupé and the Lancia Delta Nuova were all introduced in 1993, and were also built on the Tipo platform, as were the Alfa Romeo 145 and 146 and the Alfa Romeo Spider and GTV (with a different rear suspension and other chassis refinements) from 1994 to 1995.
