= Fiat 615 =

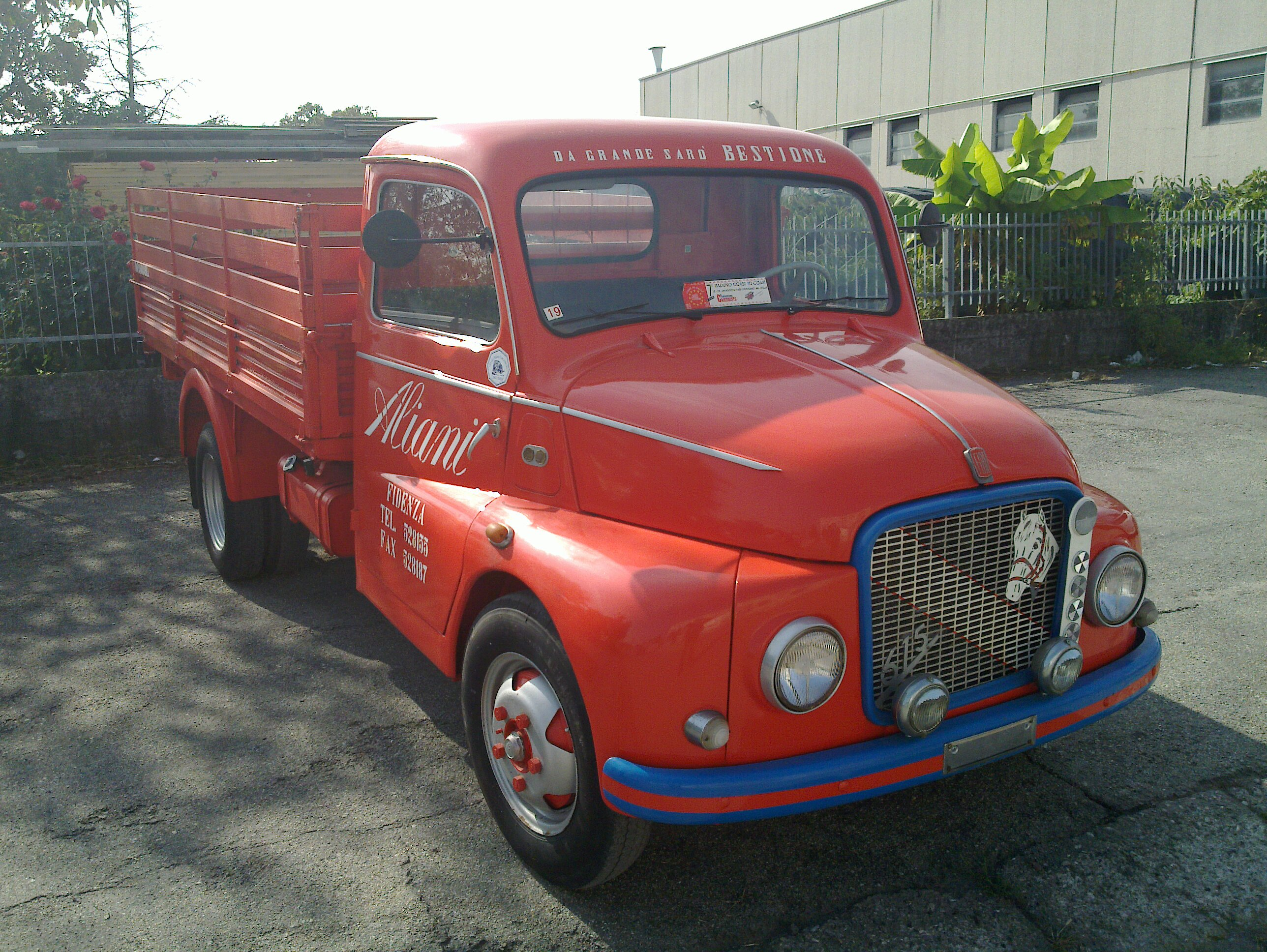

Overview
- Manufacturer: Fiat
- Production: 1951–1965, until 1978 as Fiat 616

Body and chassis
- Class: Light utility truck

Powertrain
- Engine: 1.4 L I4; 1.9 L I4; 1.9 L diesel I4; 2.6 L diesel I4; 3.1 L diesel I4; 2.3 L diesel I3
- Transmission: 4x2

Dimensions
- Length: 4,995 mm (196.7 in)
- Width: 1,924 mm (75.7 in)
- Height: 1,920 mm (75.6 in)
- Curb weight: 1,560–1,657 kg (3,439–3,653 lb)

Chronology
- Predecessor: Fiat 1100ELR
- Successor: Iveco Daily

Fiat 615 was a model of Fiat light truck manufactured from 1951 to 1953 as a successor to the Fiat 1100ELR, with which it was still built in parallel. It had a total weight of 3,100 kg (6,834 lb), and was available in versions stake or van bodywork, as a chassis cab. It was Fiat's first bonneted truck model of this size since the Fiat 618 of the 1930s.

== History ==
After the Second World War, the Italian manufacturer FIAT V.I. decided to replace its range of FIAT 1100 L, AL, ALR, BLR and ELR commercial vehicles, the first model of which was launched in 1938, by the larger 615 light truck with a payload of 1.55 tons, in 1951.

The war had left many scars in Italy and the Italians had to rebuild their country. Many heavy and light trucks were indispensable. After initially using the models that survived the war, FIAT launched the first post-war versions to replace them. Small craft businesses were starting to develop and wanted to use a small vehicle with a better load capacity than a three-wheeler with a trailer.

As early as 1948, the updated versions of the commercial Topolino, the small FIAT 500 Topolino C, were launched as well as that of the 1100 which became ELR but its payload was limited to 990 kg. There was a lack of a vehicle to fill the gap between the ubiquitous FIAT 1100 ELR van and the Fiat's larger medium-duty trucks with a payload of 4 tons, which does not require a truck license but with a payload of at least 1.5 tons. This gap was filled in 1951 by the FIAT 615, a brand new light truck with a payload of 1.55 tons, offered in flatbed truck and panel van versions.

Mechanically, the truck adopted a ladder frame chassis with a stylish contemporary cab, with most of the components, including the 1395 cc which made 29 kW (39 hp) at 3800 rpm, and a manual 4-speed transmission, taken from the Fiat 1400/1900.

=== Diesel ===
With high pressure, therefore a suitable diesel engine was developed by Fiat: a swirl chamber engine (Ricardo System) based on the 1.9 liter engine for the Fiat 1900 and the new SUV Fiat Campagnola (this engine was a bored out variant of the 1400 engine). The new diesel engine (type 305) was later also available in either sedan 1400 from 1952 in addition to the Fiat 615 N (N = Nafta = Diesel) and one year in Fiat Campagnola and Fiat. Although the experiment of the Fiat 615 built 1.9 L gasoline engine proved to be stronger and with faster drive spurt, confined themselves to the diesel, the Type 615 N. Only Steyr in Austria until 1958 offered the Fiat 615 as gasoline, as Steyr 260 with its own 50 hp 2-litre gasoline engine from the car Steyr 2000. The Fiat 615 N was a very modern vehicle that, in Italy, initially had no competition. The export ran well at the beginning, missing, or half-hearted development left the Fiat 615 N (and especially its successor) over the years to become increasingly rare even in Italy.

=== Zastava ===
In Zastava in Yugoslavia, the Fiat 615 was built with a petrol engine under license. However, not as the beginning of the Fiat, with the 1.4 L 4-cylinder engine, but with the much stronger torque 1.9 liter engine (type 105) with 47 hp (35 kW) at 3500 rpm, as well as in the also at Zastava built under license, Campagnola was used. It is unclear whether the successor (from about 1963, as Fiat 615 N1) only with the 1.9 liter petrol engine (such as 615 B) was built, with a diesel engine.

== Other variants ==
In addition to the flatbed, other variants with special bodies were made at Zastava, i.e. Zastava 620B crew cab, as was common in other Eastern European car factories (IFA, Csepel, Star, etc.).

== Fiat 616 ==
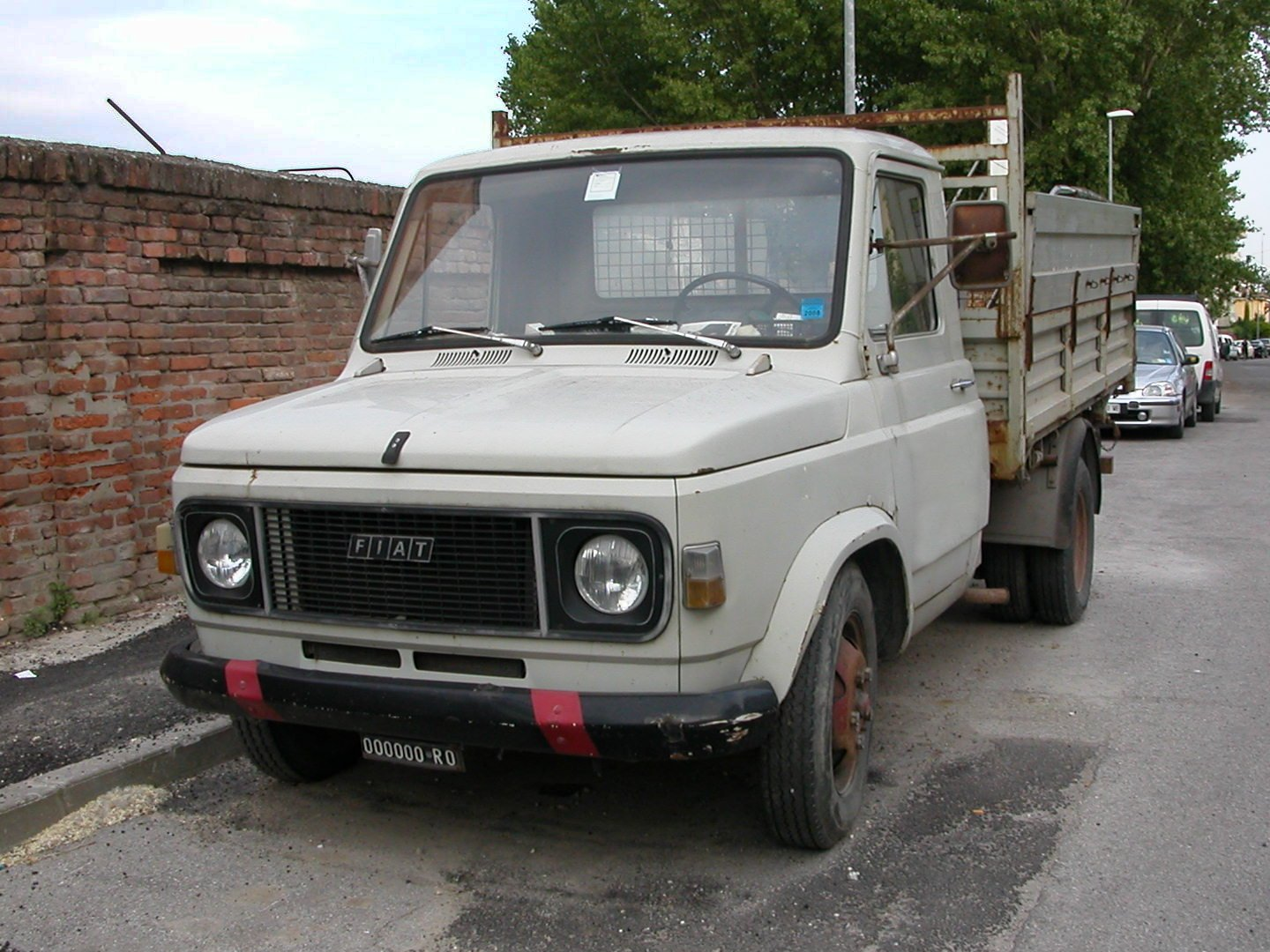
Fiat 616N3

In 1965, the truck was facelifted and renamed the Fiat 616. It received a new front end, however the cab and chassis remained the same. The engine range also saw new additions, with the 2693cc "square" 4-cylinder "model 230" diesel engine (bore and stroke 95x95) with indirect injection, which delivered a power of 51 hp (DIN) at 3500 rpm being available. This model was initially named 616 N1, and in 1966 it was renamed 616 N2/3. The N2/3 series was equipped with the new "model 803A" engine, a revolutionary 2339cc "long-stroke" 3-cylinder direct injection diesel (95X110) that still delivered 51 hp (DIN) at 3200 rpm, but which had problems due to excessive vibrations. In 1968, the truck received a new cab and a 3119cc diesel engine which produced a maximum power of 70 hp (DIN). Production continued until 1978, by which time the truck was replaced by the Iveco Daily.
