= Alfa Romeo Matta =

Alfa Romeo 1900 M
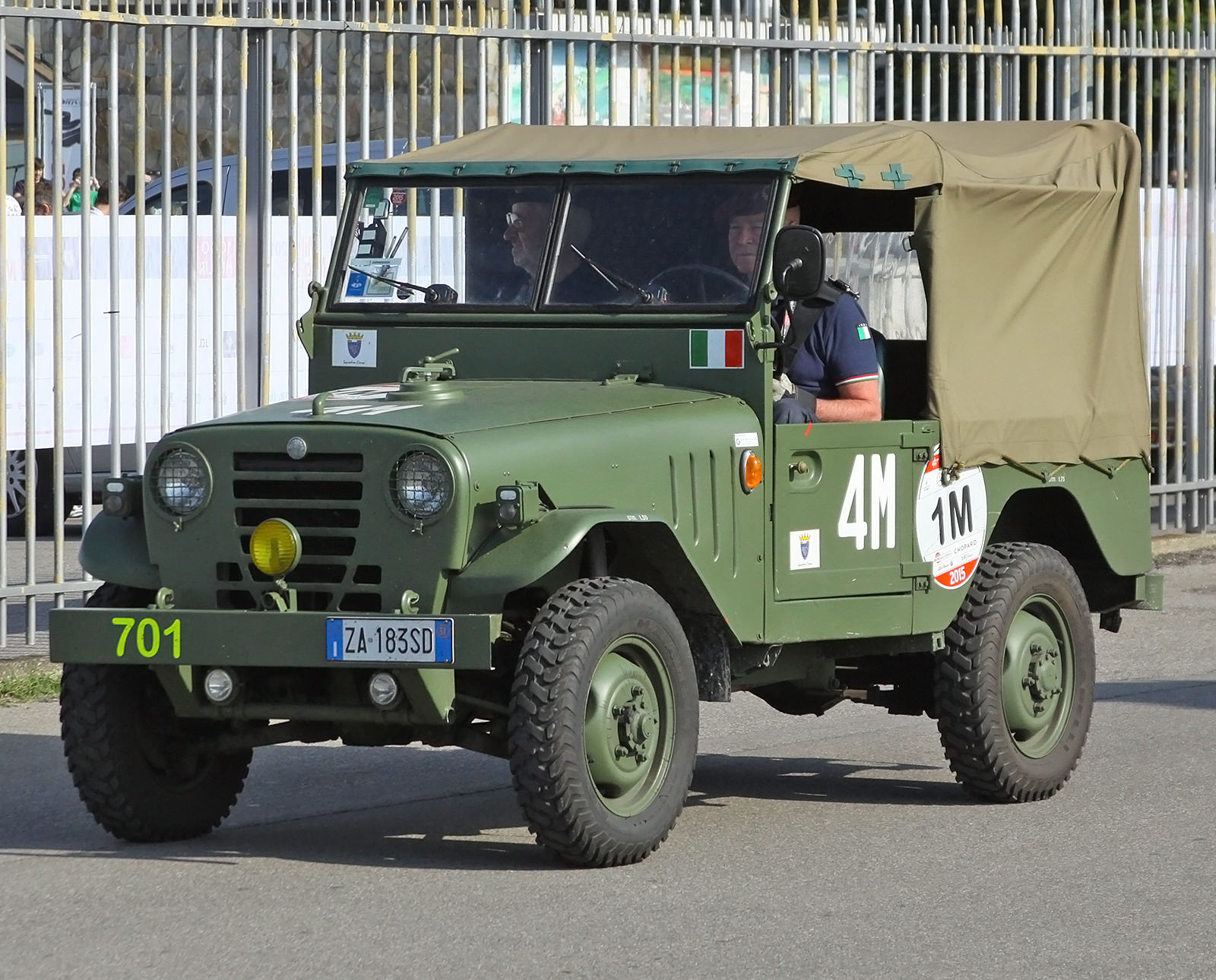

Overview
- Manufacturer: Alfa Romeo
- Also called: Alfa Romeo "Matta"
- Production: 1952–1954
- Assembly: Italy: Portello, Milan

Body and chassis
- Class: 4x4 utility truck
- Body style: 2-door 4x4
- Layout: Front-engine, four-wheel-drive
- Related: Alfa Romeo 1900

Powertrain
- Engine: 1.9 L I4 (petrol)
- Transmission: 4-speed manual with low ratio transfer box

Dimensions
- Wheelbase: 2,200 mm (86.6 in)
- Length: 3,520 mm (138.6 in)
- Width: 1,575 mm (62.0 in)
- Height: 1,820 mm (71.7 in)
- Kerb weight: 1,250 kg (2,756 lb) (dry)

The Alfa Romeo 1900 M (better known by its nickname Alfa Romeo Matta, meaning "mad") is a four-wheel drive utility vehicle produced by Italian car manufacturer Alfa Romeo from 1951 to 1954. Developed on request of the Italian Ministry of Defence, it was made in both military (AR 51) and civilian (AR 52) versions.

== History ==
The AR 51 (Autovettura da Ricognizione, "Reconnaissance Car") was the result of the request of a light reconnaissance vehicle for use on paved, unpaved and mountain roads. A civilian version, the AR 52, was later developed from the military AR 51; several variants were made, adapted for use in agriculture, firefighting, and road maintenance.

The Matta was built from 1952 to 1954, with 2,007 military AR 51s for the Italian Army and 154 civilian AR 52 units produced. In 1954, the Italian army abandoned the AR 51 and switched to the Fiat Campagnola, which was mechanically simpler.

== Specifications ==
The Matta was powered by a 1884 cc twin cam, 8-valve inline-four engine with dry sump lubrication. The cylinder head was aluminium and featured hemispherical combustion chambers, while the engine block was cast iron. Output was 65 PS (48 kW; 64 hp) at 4,400 rpm.

Technical data 1900 M AR 51 - AR 52
Engine:	4-cylinder-inline engine (four-stroke), front-mounted
Displacement:	1,884 cc (115.0 cu in)
Bore x Stroke:	82.5 mm (3.2 in) x 88 mm (3.5 in)
Max. Power @ rpm:	65 PS (47.8 kW; 64.1 bhp) @ 4400
Max. Torque @ rpm:	12.5 kg⋅m (123 N⋅m; 90 lb⋅ft) @ 2500
Compression Ratio:	7:1
Fuel system:	1 Solex carburetor 33 PBIC, mechanical fuel pump
Valvetrain:	DOHC, double chain
Cooling:	Water
Gearbox:	4 forward, 1 reverse + dual range
Front suspension:	Independent front suspension with double unequal length wishbones
Rear suspension::	Live rear axle
Brakes:	Hydraulic drum brakes, mechanical handbrake on driveshaft
Body:	Steel body with separate ladder chassis
Track front/rear:	1,300 mm (51.2 in) / 1,300 mm (51.2 in)
Wheelbase:	2,200 mm (86.6 in)
Length x Width x Height:	3,520 mm (138.6 in) x 1,575 mm (62.0 in) x 1,820 mm (71.7 in)
Ground clearance:	20.5 cm (8.1 in)
Max water deep:	70 cm (27.6 in)
Max slope:	120% (50 °)
Weight:	1,250 kg (2,755.8 lb)
Top speed:	105 km/h (65.2 mph)

== Gallery ==
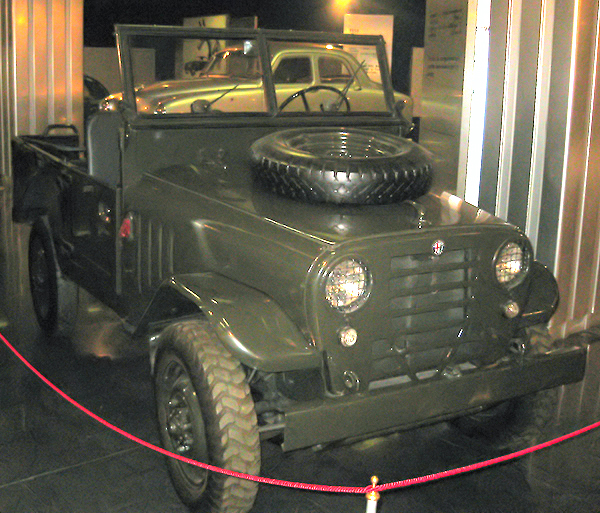

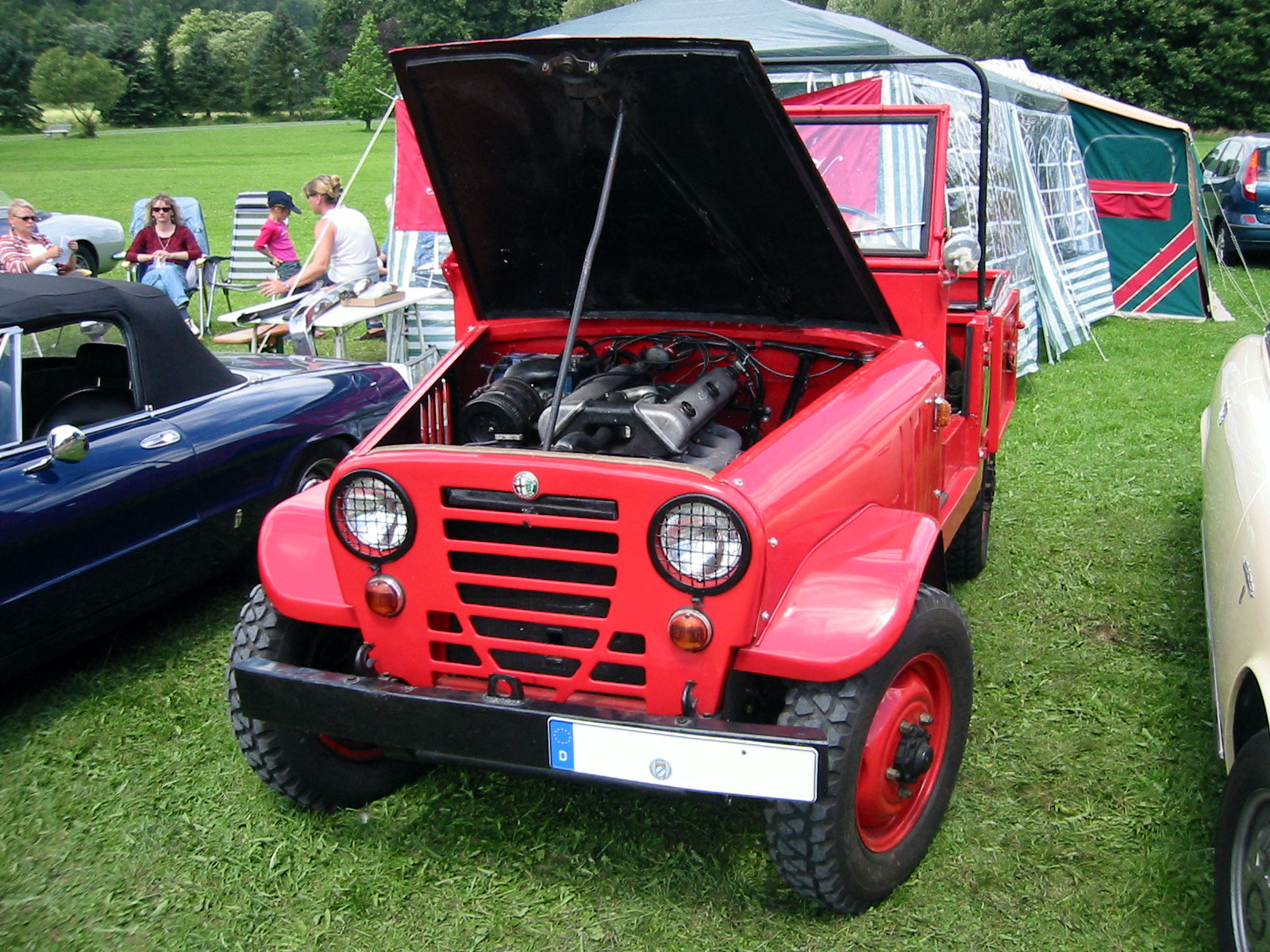

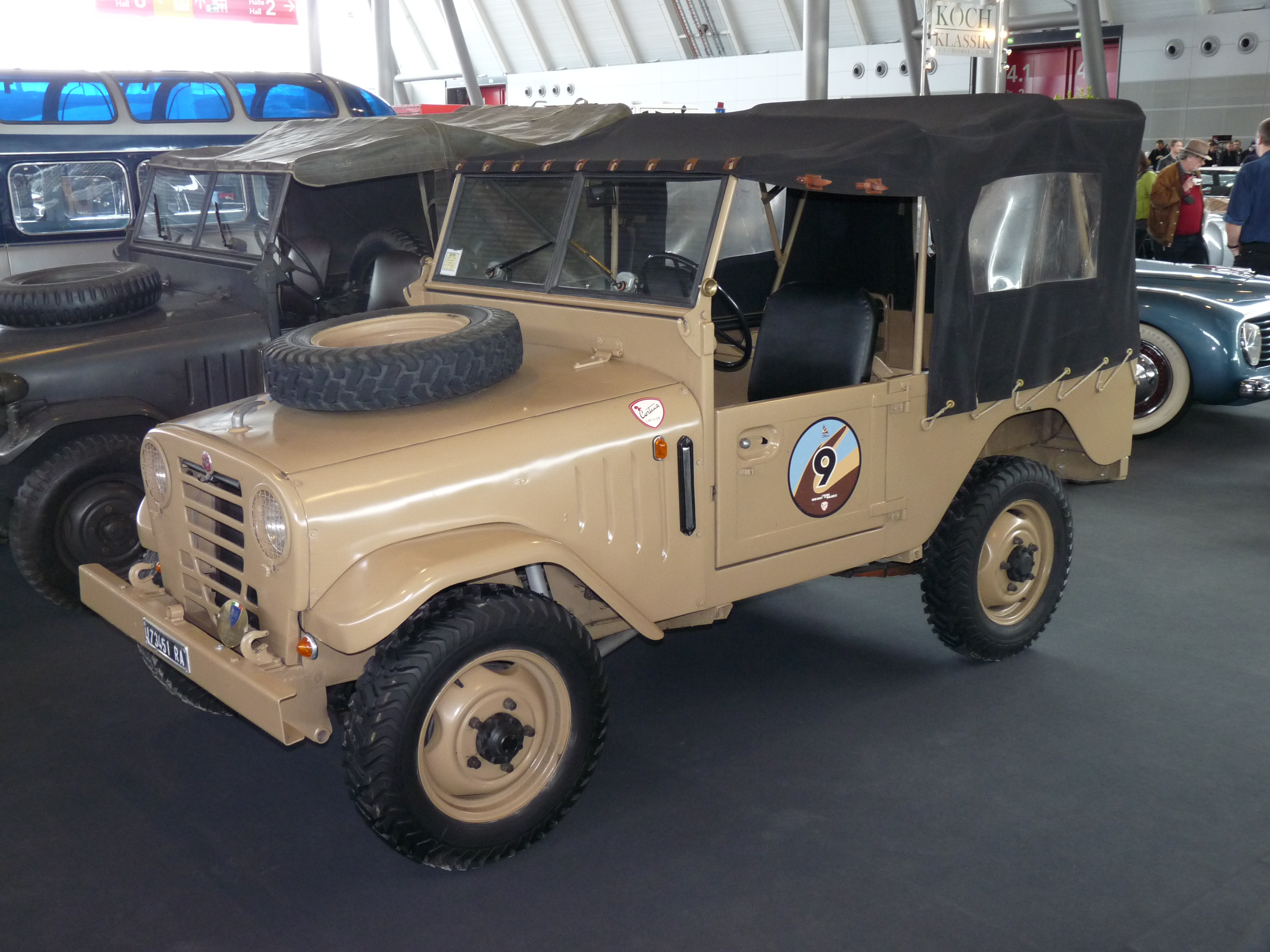

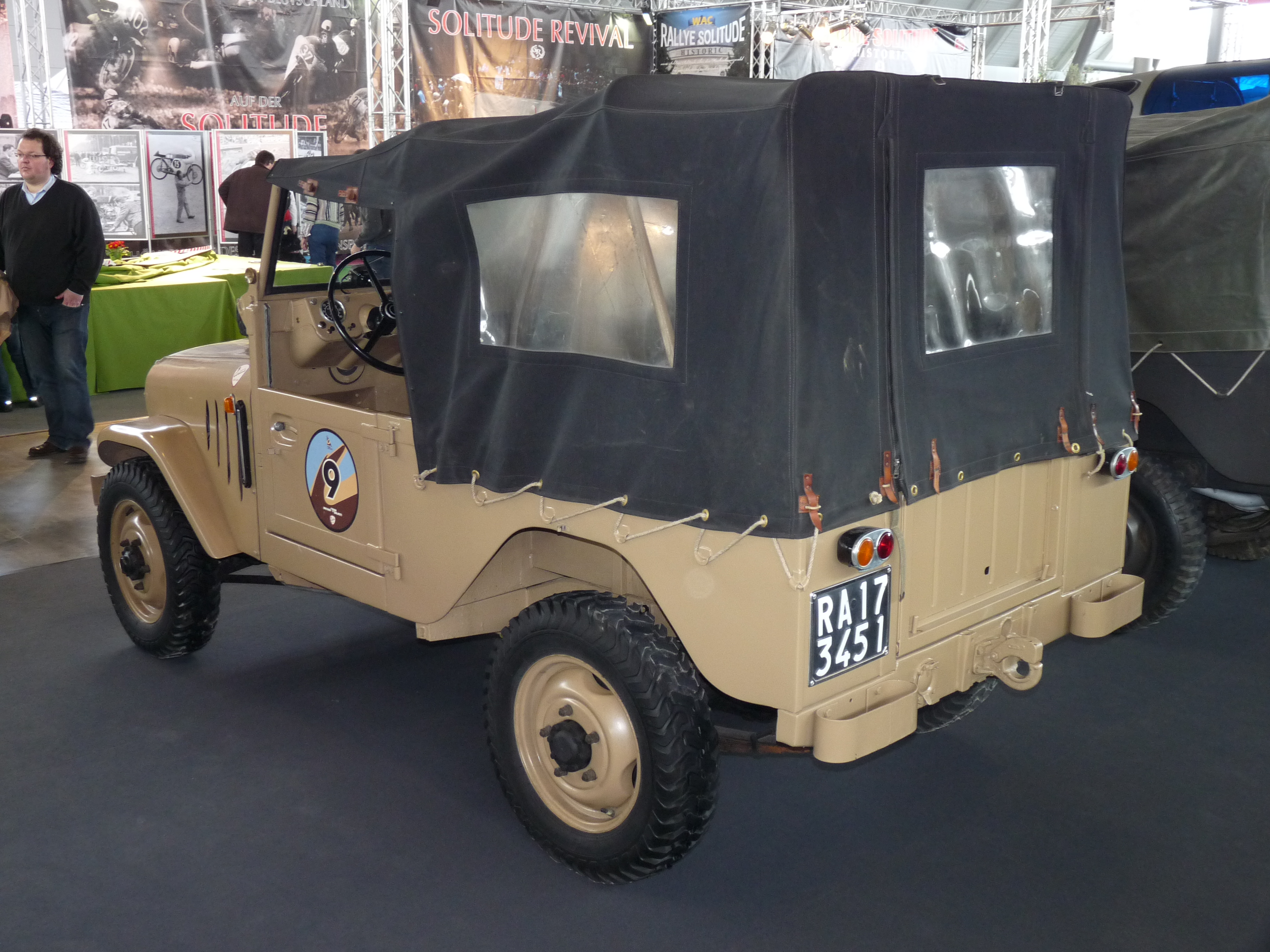

== Bibliography ==
- Fusi, Luigi (1978). Alfa Romeo—Tutte le vetture dal 1910—All cars from 1910 (3rd ed.). Milan: Emmeti Grafica editrice.
