= Fiat 1400 and 1900 =

1950 Italian car model

Fiat 1400 Fiat 1900
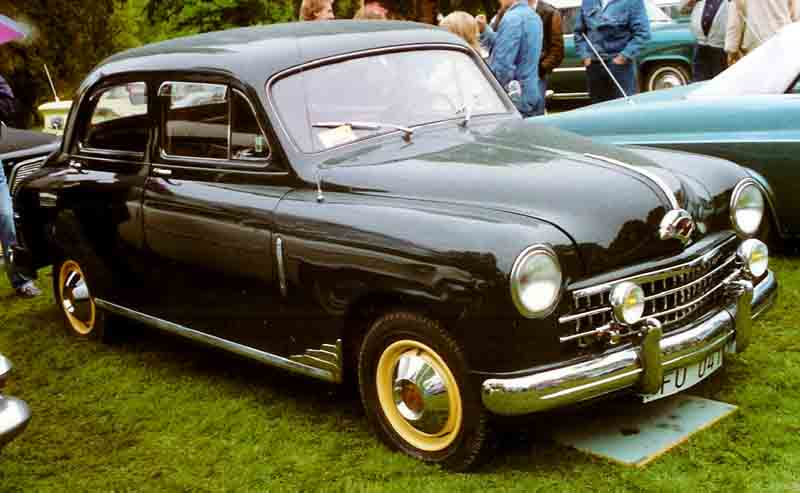
- 1951 Fiat 1400 Berlina

Overview
- Manufacturer: Fiat
- Also called: NSU-Fiat 1400/1900 (West Germany); Steyr 2000 (Austria); SEAT 1400 (Spain); Zastava 1400 BJ (Yugoslavia)
- Production: 1950–1958; 1954–1961 (Yugoslavia); 1953–1959 (Austria)
- Assembly: Italy: Turin (Mirafiori Plant); West Germany: Heilbronn (Neckar Automobilwerke); Austria: Graz (Steyr Puch); Spain: Barcelona (Zona Franca); Yugoslavia: Kragujevac (Zastava)
- Designer: Dante Giacosa

Body and chassis
- Body style: 4-door saloon (1400 & 1900); 2-door cabriolet (1400); 2-door hardtop coupé (1900)
- Layout: Front-engine, rear-wheel-drive
- Related: SEAT 1400

Powertrain
- Engine: 1.4 L I4; 1.9 L I4; 1.9 L diesel I4
- Transmission: 4/5-speed manual

Dimensions
- Wheelbase: 2,650 mm (104.3 in)
- Length: 4,240 mm (166.9 in)
- Width: 1,660 mm (65.4 in)
- Height: 1,530 mm (60.2 in)
- Kerb weight: 1,150–1,250 kg (2,535–2,756 lb)

Chronology
- Predecessor: Fiat 1500
- Successor: Fiat 1300 and 1500; Fiat 1800/2100

The Fiat 1400 and Fiat 1900 are passenger cars produced by Italian automotive manufacturer Fiat from 1950 to 1958 and from 1952 to 1959 respectively. The two models shared body and platform, but while the 1.4-litre 1400 was Fiat's intermediate offering, the upmarket 1900 had an enlarged 1.9-litre engine and more luxurious trim and equipment, to serve as flagship in the manufacturer's range.

The 1400 marked Fiat's first all-new postwar model, its first unibody car, and its first passenger car offered with a diesel engine. It also was the first passenger car produced by Spanish manufacturer SEAT and by Yugoslavian manufacturer Zastava.

== History ==
The Fiat 1400 was introduced at the 1950 Geneva Motor Show. It was the first unibody Fiat automobile. In 1953, the introduction of a diesel version with a 1900 cc engine marked another Fiat first, although the diesel version was known as the 1400 Diesel.

Also in 1953, the 1400 entered production in Spain as the SEAT 1400, the first model produced by SEAT. The following year it also became the first passenger car produced by Crvena Zastava in FNRY, the Zastava 1400 BJ. Equipped with a 2.0 litre Steyr engine, it was produced as "Steyr 2000" by Steyr-Daimler-Puch AG in Austria from 1953.

The Fiat 1900, introduced in 1952, was an upmarket model that used the same body as the 1400, but came with a 1.9 litre engine and more standard features. The petrol-engined Fiat 1900 A, introduced in 1954, now offered a claimed 70 bhp. Unusually for that time, it featured a 5-speed column shifted manual transmission. It also offered an hydraulic joint, Fiat's first tentative foray into automatic transmissions.

The engine and transmission of the Fiat 1400/1900 were used in the Fiat 615 truck and Fiat Campagnola SUV.

== Features ==
- The engine had a 1.4 L capacity and a power output of 44 hp (33 kW) at 4400 rpm.
- The larger engine offered from 1952 had a 1.9 L capacity and a power output of 70 CV (51 kW) at 4400 rpm.
- It had a maximum speed of 120 km/h (75 mph) (1400 cc version).
- Unloaded weight of 1,120 kg (2,469 lb).
- Hand brake handle under instrument panel,
- Retaining loops for front seat passengers at the roof and at the backrests,
- Armrests in the doors
- Fuel filler access was through a trap door in the floor of the trunk/boot, thus keeping the fuel safe once the car was closed and locked
- The 1900 came standard with a radio and a rudimental "trip computer" that showed the average speed.

About 179,000 1400s and 19,000 1900s were built.

A 1400 cc model tested by the British magazine The Motor in 1950 had a top speed of 74.4 mph (119.7 km/h) and could accelerate from 0-60 mph (97 km/h) in 35.7 seconds. A fuel consumption of 24.2 miles per imperial gallon (11.7 L/100 km; 20.2 mpg_{‑US}) was recorded. The car was never sold in the UK, but the Italian market price would have equated to approximately £750 including taxes. Having eulogised the performance and "quite exceptional...top gear flexibility", British journalists went on to praise the "astonishing silence, smoothness and comfort provided by the vehicle", highlighting various "unique features designed to prevent the transmission of noise and vibration to the passengers". Great use was made of rubber and of "a sound-proofing compound...liberally coated...[on the car's]...integral structure".

The Motor tested a 1901 cc diesel model in 1954 and recorded a top speed of 63.8 mph (102.7 km/h), acceleration from 0-60 mph (97 km/h) in 45.2 seconds and a fuel consumption of 33.9 miles per imperial gallon (8.3 L/100 km; 28.2 mpg_{‑US}). The car was not at the time available on the UK market but a price in Italy of 1,545,000 Lire was quoted which they worked out as equivalent to £909.

== Models ==
Model	Engine	Displacement	Power	Fuel system
1400	OHV I4	1395 cc	44-56 hp	single carburetor
1400 D	OHV I4	1901 cc	40 hp	diesel
1900	OHV I4	1901 cc	60-80 hp	single carburetor

== Coachbuilt versions ==
A Fiat 1400 Cabriolet was designed by Giovanni Michelotti and bodied by Carrozzeria Vignale specifically for the 1952 Turin Motor Show. The Fiat was later driven by actor Kirk Douglas in the 1955 movie The Racers. The car was later registered in 1964 and was not seen for many years. Its current owner acquired the car in 2015, and it was returned to Italy for a complete restoration.

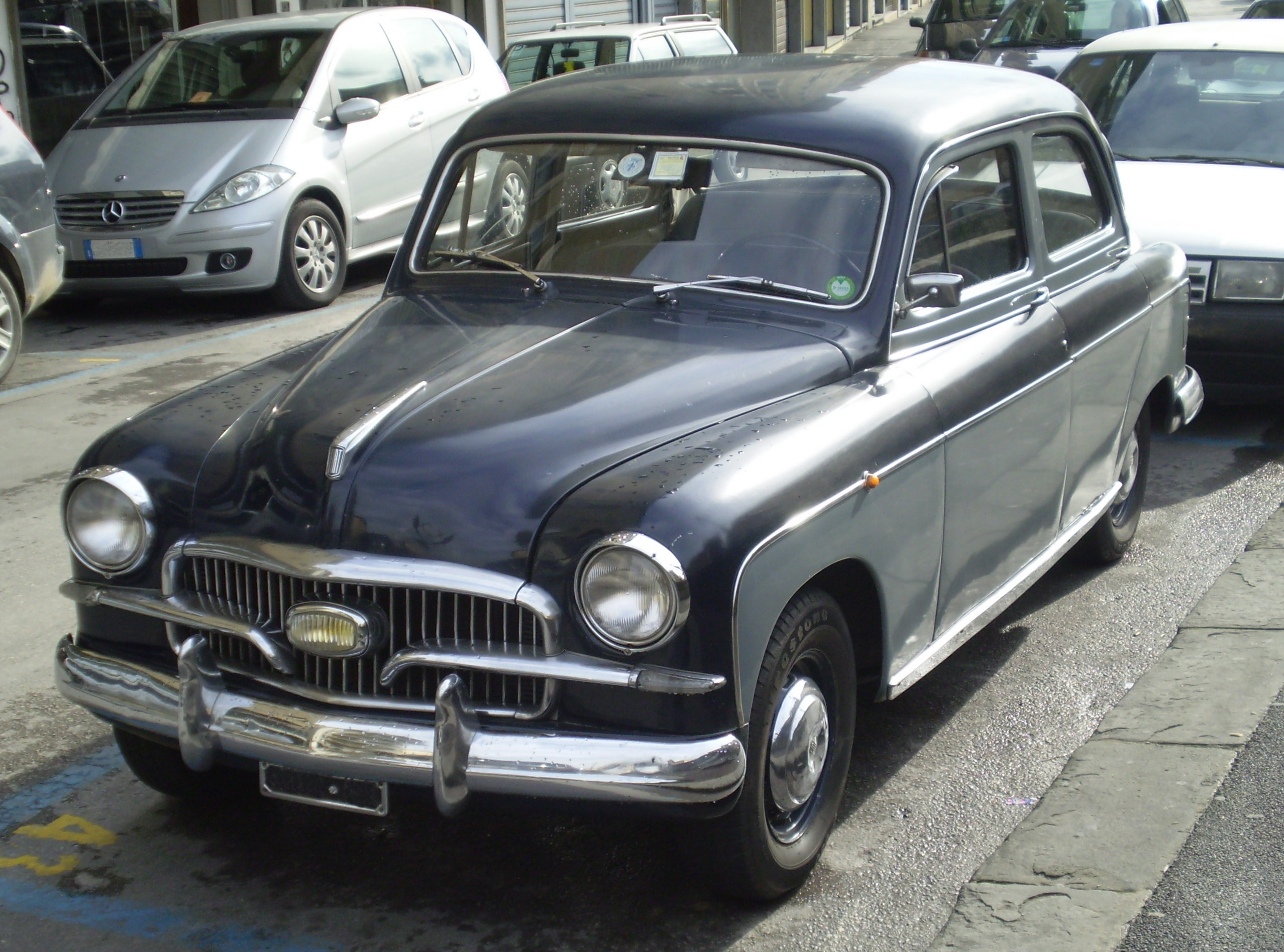
Fiat 1400 Berlina (1956)

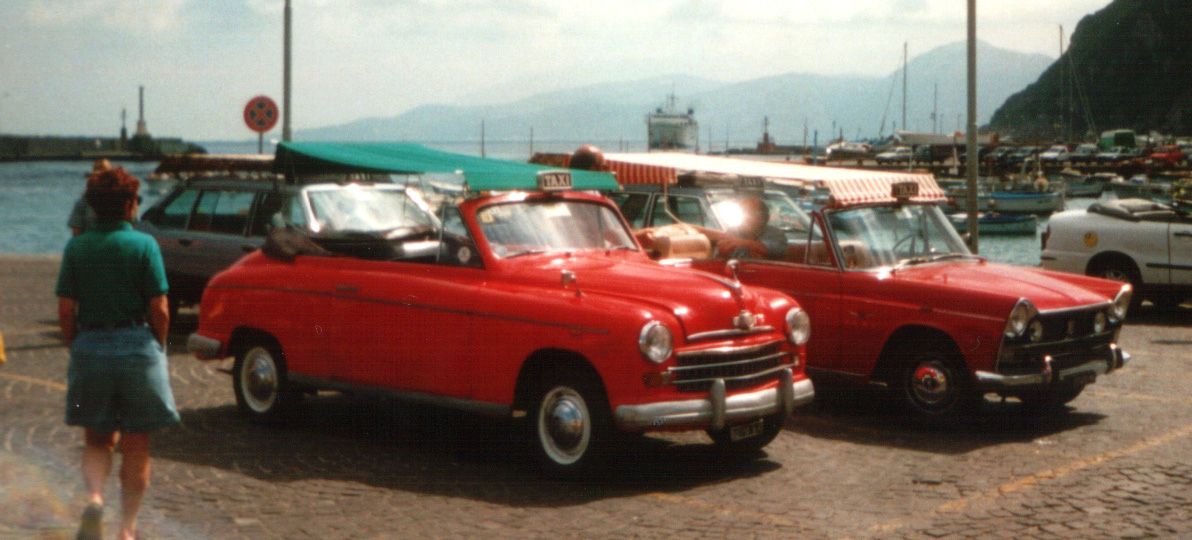
Fiat 1400 Cabriolet

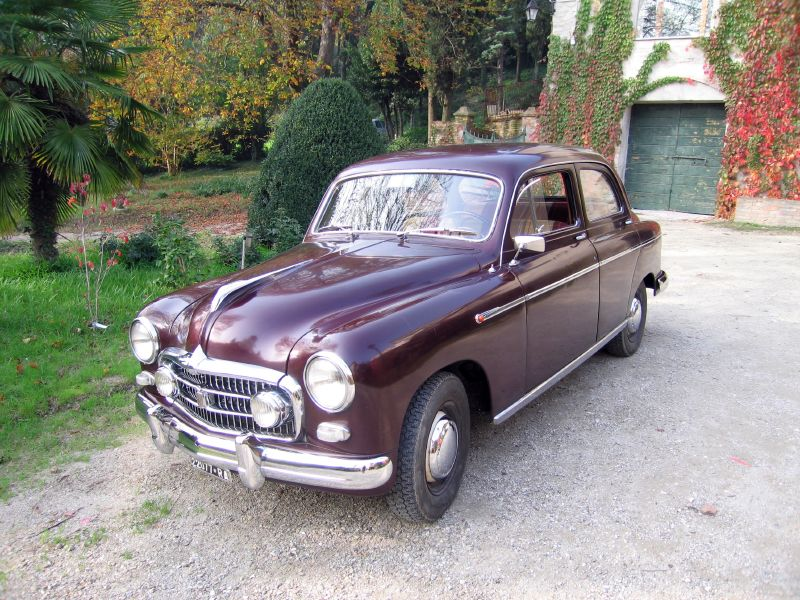
Fiat 1900 A Berlina

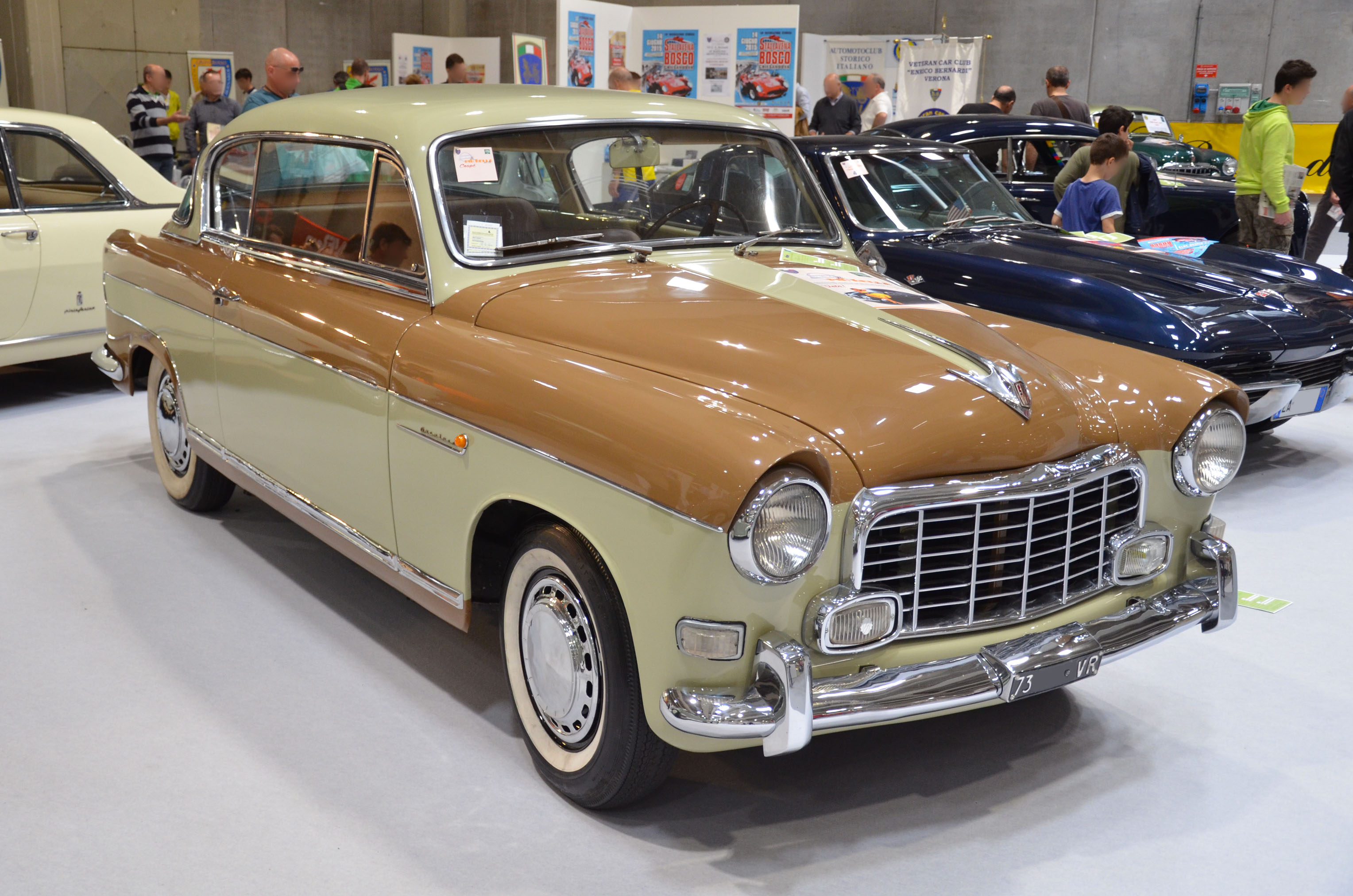
Fiat 1900 B Gran Luce

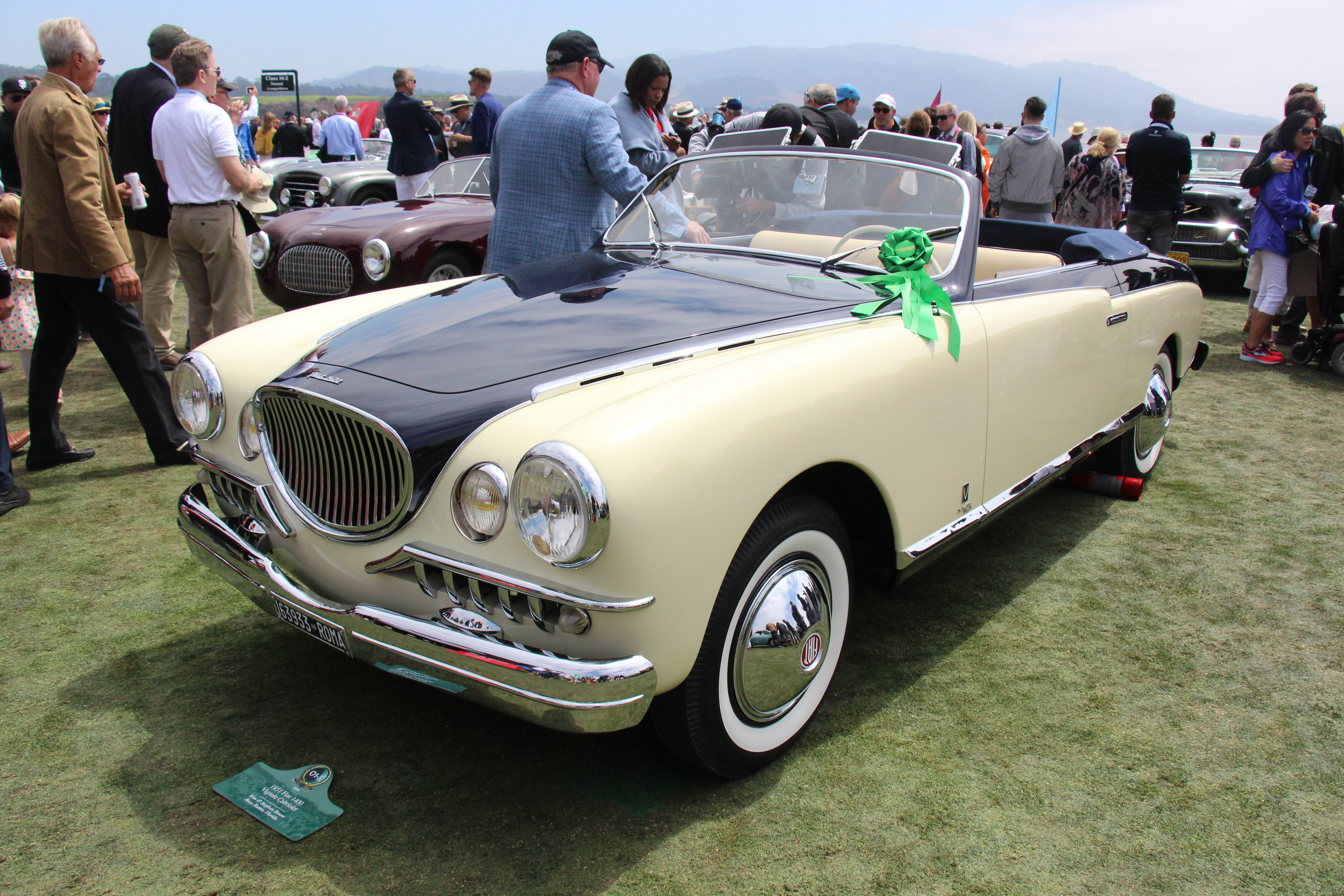
1951 Fiat 1400 Vignale Cabriolet
