= Fiat Campagnola =

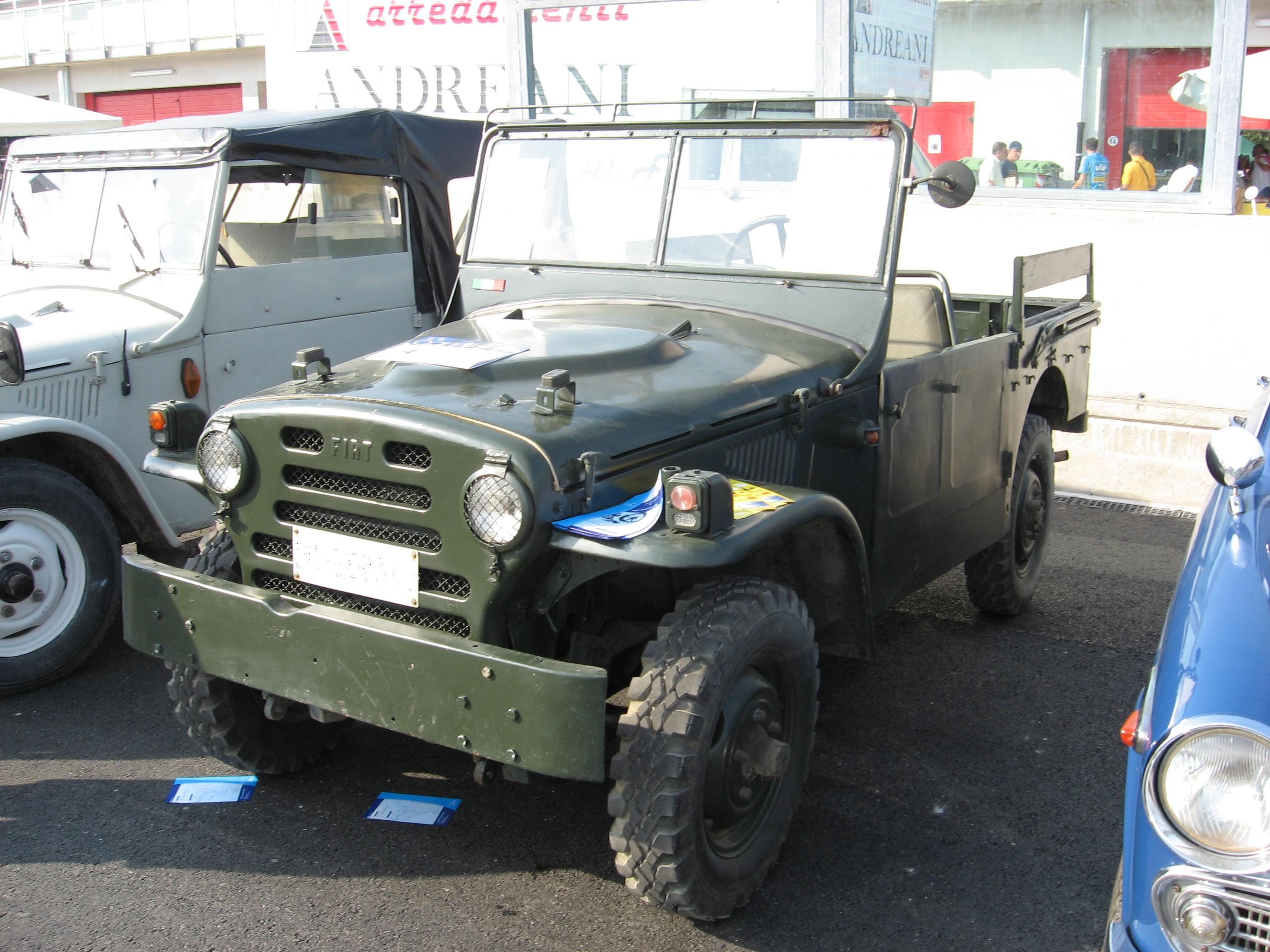

Overview
- Manufacturer: Fiat
- Also called: Zastava AR51/AR55; Kampanjola (in Yugoslavia)
- Production: 1951–1973
- Assembly: Italy: Turin; Yugoslavia: Kragujevac (Zastava)

Dimensions
- Wheelbase: 225 cm (88.6 in)
- Length: 360 cm (141.7 in); 403 cm (158.7 in)
- Width: 148 cm (58.3 in)
- Height: 195 cm (76.8 in)
- Curb weight: 1,250 kg (2,760 lb) -1,350 kg (2,980 lb)

The Fiat Campagnola is a heavy-duty off-road vehicle produced by Fiat from 1951 to 1987. Production started in 1951 and it was upgraded in 1974. It was inspired by the Willys Jeep.

== Fiat 1101 "Campagnola" (1951–1973) ==
At the beginning of the 50s, the Ministry of Defense launched a call for tenders for the supply of a light off-road vehicle, to replace the Willys MB inherited from the allies, now worn out and increasingly difficult to maintain efficient. In reality, for some time now, FIAT had secretly begun the study, under the direction of engineer Giacosa, of a four-wheel drive vehicle, inspired by the Willys, at the suggestion of the Ministry itself.

The name of the "1101" project called "Alpina" was later changed to "Campagnola" so as not to emphasize its military use, as the word Alpina recalled too much the homonymous army corps and such a vehicle risked not finding consensus among FIAT workers and public opinion; The war had ended only a few years earlier and the memory was still too strong.

FIAT and Alfa Romeo responded to the publication of the tender, respectively with the 1101 (Campagnola) and 1900 M models. The Turin off-road vehicle on the date of publication of the tender was already in an advanced state of construction and had already accumulated hundreds of hours of testing, while Alfa Romeo had to make up for the time with a considerable design effort, managing in a few months to create a valid vehicle, using a Land Rover, which had recently entered production, as a starting point for his prototype. The race was won by FIAT, although during the demonstration tests, the Alfa Romeo 1900 M (nicknamed Matta for its ability to go anywhere) proved to be superior in some cases. The Campagnola was advantaged by the considerably lower cost compared to the Alfa Romeo prototype and the simplicity of construction.

The Campagnola 1101 immediately proved to be a good vehicle, equipped with a sturdy steel frame with side members. Most other parts, including the gasoline 1901 cm³ engine which made 53 hp (39 kW) at 3700 rpm, were taken from the Fiat 1400/1900. All four wheels were driven via a semi-synchronised four-speed gearbox with centre shift and two-speed distributor (front-wheel drive engaged). On request, there was a switchable PTO. At the rear, a rigid axle was installed on leaf springs and hydraulic telescopic shock absorbers, the front wheels were individually suspended on slightly slanted double wishbones with coil springs and hydraulic shock absorbers.

In 1953, the Fiat Campagnola Diesel appeared, which, like the Fiat 1400 Diesel and the Fiat 615 N light truck, was powered by a four-cylinder in-line engine with a displacement of 1905 cc and a maximum output of 40 hp (29 kW) at 3200 rpm. He reached a top speed of 85 km/h.

=== Civilian models ===
Model	Engine	Displacement	Power	Fuelsystem
1101	inline-four ohv	1,901 cc	53-63 hp	single carburetor
1101A	inline-four ohv	1,901 cc	53-63 hp	single carburetor
1102	inline-four ohv	1,901 cc	40 hp	diesel
1102A	inline-four ohv	1,901 cc	43 hp	diesel
1102B	inline-four ohv	1,901 cc	51 hp	diesel
1102C	inline-four ohv	1,895 cc	47 hp	diesel

== Fiat 1107 "Nuova Campagnola" (1974–1987) ==
Fiat Nuova Campagnola
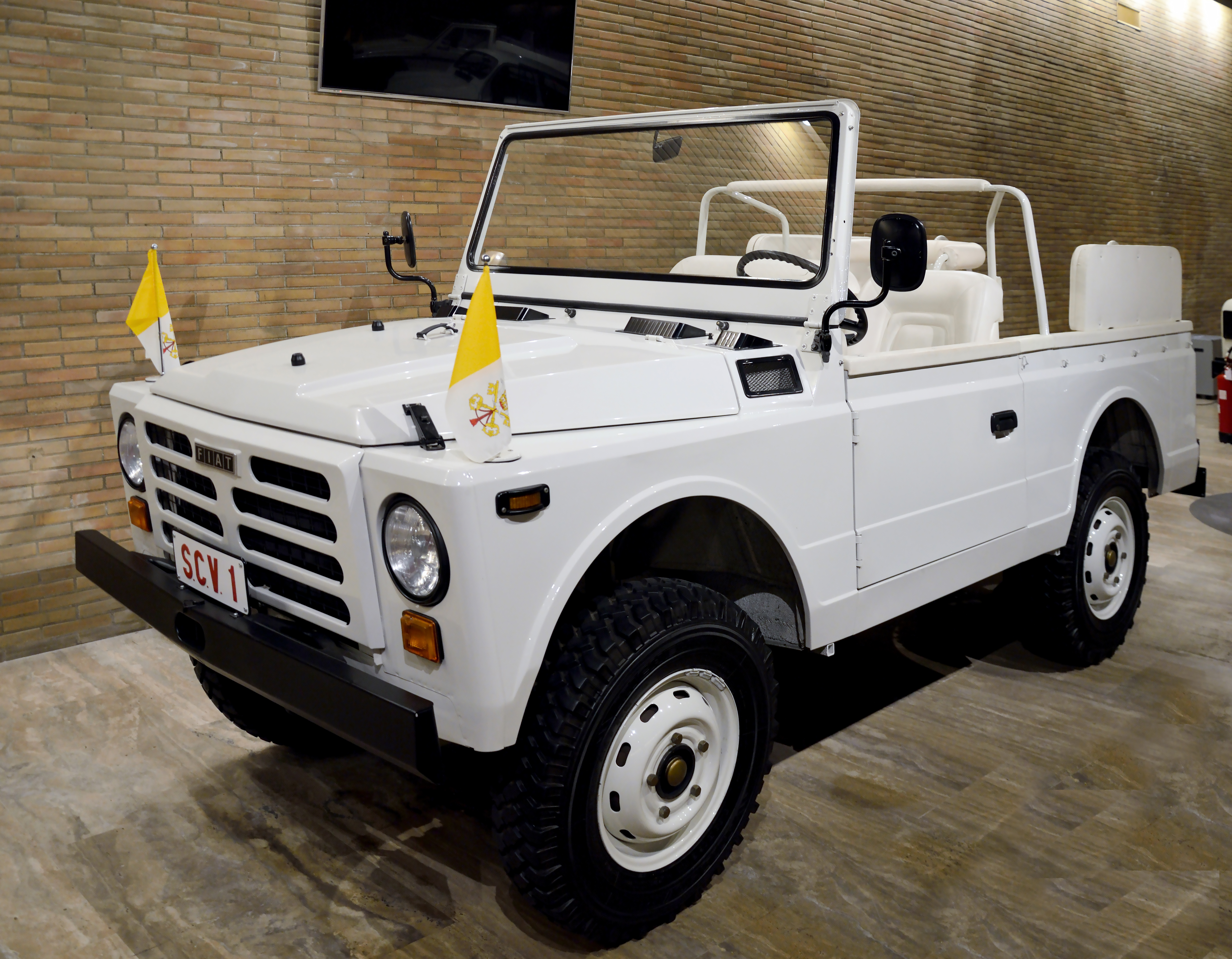
- Fiat Campagnola as Popemobile in which Pope John Paul II was victim of an assassination attempt. This vehicle is now in the "Carriage museum" of the Vatican City.

Overview
- Manufacturer: Fiat
- Also called: Renault TRM500
- Production: 1974–1987
- Assembly: Italy: Turin

Dimensions
- Wheelbase: 230 cm (90.6 in)
- Length: 378 cm (148.8 in); 403 cm (158.7 in)
- Width: 158 cm (62.2 in)
- Height: 195 cm (76.8 in)
- Curb weight: 1,750 kg (3,860 lb)

The Campagnola was redesigned for launch in June 1974 and in this form produced until 1987.

The new vehicle used the petrol engine of the Fiat 132, but with a longer stroke which increased the capacity to 1,995 cc. - the same enlarged engine turned up in the Fiat 132 itself two years later, albeit with twin overhead camshafts. There was a light alloy cylinder head: instead of the twin overhead camshafts of the 132, the engine in the Campagnola had a single side-mounted camshaft driven by a toothed belt, the valve movement being driven by pushrods and rockers.

As an option, a Sofim 2.5 litre diesel engine was also available.

The large square engine compartment gave easy access to the engine bay which was designed to permit "wading" up to 70 cm deep.

The 57 litre fuel tank was positioned well out of range from rocks and flying stones, under the twin passenger seat beside the driver.

Torsion bars suspended all four wheels, with two shock absorbers for each of the rear wheels and a single one for each of the front wheels. All six shocks used were of identical specification and thus interchangeable. Road testers from the UK commended the smoothness of the ride over rough ground which evidently compared very favourably with that offered by the Land Rover of the time.

A military version was introduced in 1976 (AR76) and in 1979, after a new update, it was called AR76.

=== Engines ===
Model	Engine	Displacement	Power	Fuelsystem
1107	inline-four ohv	1,995 cc	80 hp	single carburetor
1107 D	inline-four SOHC	1,995 cc	60 hp	diesel
1107 D	inline-four SOHC	2,445 cc	72 hp	diesel

== Others ==
=== Renault derivative ===
In 1976 the French army was about to replace its Jeeps and several prototype series were made: Peugeot proposed the P4, an adaptation of the Mercedes G-Wagen, powered by the gasoline engine of Peugeot 504. Citroën offered its own version of the Volkswagen Iltis, using the CX Athena engine and renamed as C44. The Renault Campagnola TRM500 was derivative of Fiat Campagnola and used engine of Renault R20. Finally the Peugeot P4 was chosen as new army jeep.

=== Zastava ===
In 1954 Zastava began production of the Zastava AR51, under license from Fiat. By the end of the year, 17 examples were delivered to the Yugoslav People's Army. In 1955, focus changed to the new AR55 model. This was the last change in design, and all future Zastava Campagnolas were based on it. The AR55 saw a wide range of uses within the army, from ambulances to military police vehicles. Production lasted until 1974. A total of 9089 AR55 military vehicles were produced. From the initials AR, it earned the nickname "Aerka".

== See also ==
- Alfa Romeo Matta
- Iveco Massif
