= Zastava 620B =

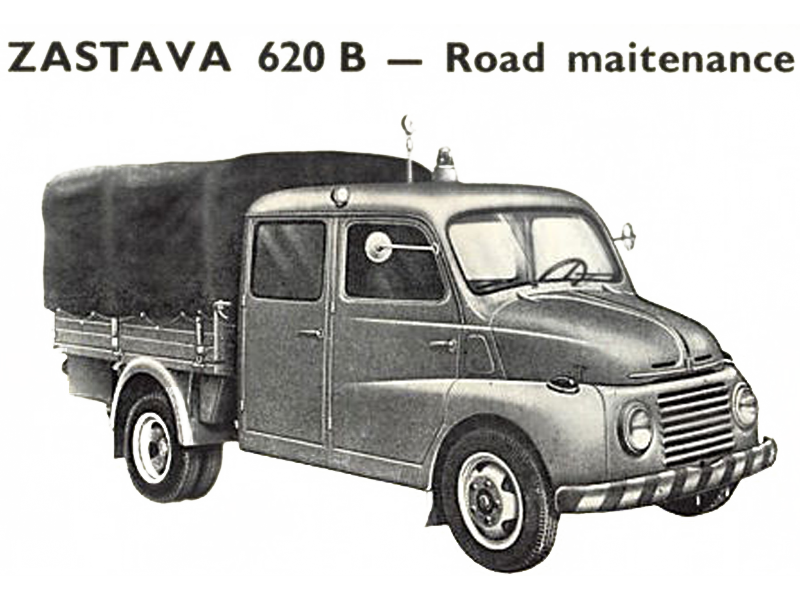

Overview
- Manufacturer: Zastava Automobiles
- Production: 1962–1976

Body and chassis
- Class: Light utility truck

Powertrain
- Engine: Diesel Fiat 305 - 1.901 cm3
- Transmission: 4x2

Dimensions
- Length: 5,295 mm (208.5 in)
- Width: 1,924 mm (75.7 in)
- Height: 1,920 mm (75.6 in)
- Curb weight: 3,500 kg (7,716 lb) (with payload)

Zastava 620B was a crew cab (double cab) light utility truck, developed on the basis by Fiat 615, also produced by Zastava Automobiles under licence since 1961.

== Characteristics ==
Vehicle was equipped with Fiat's 1.9 liter gasoline engine, featuring seating places for 6 persons laid in two rows, with 3 or 4 doors and a flatbed. It kept the model's distinctive design feature - front suicide doors.

== Equipment ==
Truck was developed to carry six persons and 1,200 kg (2,600 lb) of payload. The vehicle was equipped with yellow rotating light and mobile reflector for lighting up roads at night work.

Vehicle was delivered in yellow color, which was mandatory for this type of vehicles. The front bumpers and rear body side were painted in red-white slanting stripes.

Production of this light utility truck flourished until 1969, when company started retooling and introducing new technologies. However, production of this model continued until 1976.

== Legacy ==
Zastava 615 and Zastava 620 earned somewhat a cult status in the countries of the former Yugoslavia. This truck had significant appearance in the cult Yugoslav TV series Kamiondžije (Truckers).
