= Zastava, Črnomelj =

Zastava
- Location in Slovenia
- Coordinates: 45°34′56.71″N 15°14′9.7″E
- Country: Slovenia
- Traditional region: White Carniola
- Statistical region: Southeast Slovenia
- Municipality: Črnomelj

Area
  - Total: 4.67 km^{2} (1.80 sq mi)
- Elevation: 164.7 m (540 ft)

Population (2020)
  - Total: 14
  - Density: 3.0/km^{2} (7.8/sq mi)
- Postal code: 8340

Zastava (pronounced [ˈzaːstaʋa]; German: Sastawa) is a small settlement on the Lahinja River east of Črnomelj in the White Carniola area of southeastern Slovenia. The area is part of the traditional region of Lower Carniola and is now included in the Southeast Slovenia Statistical Region.
