= Fiat Ducato =

Light commercial vehicle developed by Fiat and PSA

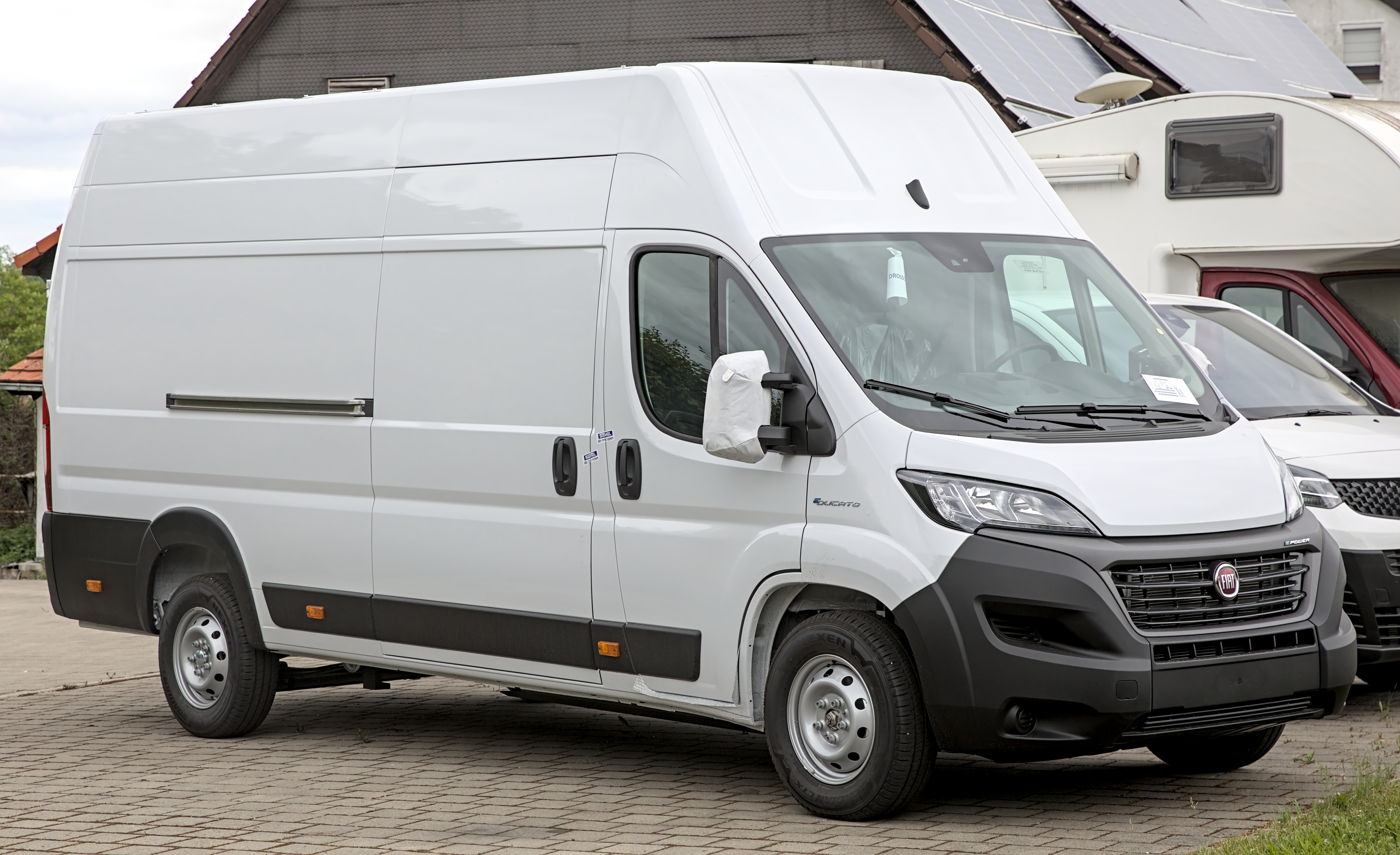

Overview
- Manufacturer: Sevel (1981–2021); Stellantis (2021–present)
- Also called: Citroën Jumper; Citroën Relay; Iveco SuperJolly; Opel Movano; Peugeot Boxer; Ram ProMaster; Toyota Proace Max; Vauxhall Movano; Zastava Rival
- Production: 1981–present

Body and chassis
- Class: Light commercial vehicle (M)
- Layout: Front-engine, front-wheel-drive

Chronology
- Predecessor: Fiat 242; Fiat Daily; Alfa Romeo Romeo (for Alfa Romeo AR6); Citroën H Van (for Citroën C25); Dodge Spacevan (for Talbot Express); Dodge Sprinter (for Ram ProMaster); Peugeot J9 (for Peugeot J5); Renault Master (for Opel/Vauxhall Movano)

The Fiat Ducato is a light commercial vehicle jointly developed by FCA Italy and PSA Group (now Stellantis), and mainly manufactured by Sevel, a joint venture between the two companies since 1981. It has also been sold as the Citroën C25, Peugeot J5, Alfa Romeo AR6, Talbot Express, and later as the Fiat Ducato, Citroën Jumper (Relay first in the United Kingdom and then in Australia; Dispatch in Australia as a shorter variant), Zastava Rival and Peugeot Boxer (Manager in Mexico), from 1994 onwards. It entered the North American market as the Ram ProMaster in May 2014 as a 2014 model.

In Europe, it is produced at the Sevel Sud factory, in Atessa, Italy. It has also been produced at the Iveco factory in Sete Lagoas, Brazil, at the Karsan factory in Akçalar, Turkey, at the Fiat Chrysler Automobiles Saltillo Van Assembly Plant in Saltillo, Mexico, and at the Fiat-Sollers factory in Elabuga, Russia. Since 1981, more than 3.5 million Fiat Ducatos have been produced. The name "Ducato" is a reference to the ducat; after the Fiorino and Marengo, this was the third Fiat light commercial vehicle to be named after ancient coinage.

In July 2019, the electric version of the Ducato developed by FCA Italy was presented, and sales commenced in 2020; a refreshed model debuted for 2024. An electric version for the North American market, the Ram ProMaster EV, was unveiled in early 2024.

In addition to the RAM ProMaster launched in 2014, starting with the 2022 model year, the Ducato has also been rebadged as the Opel/Vauxhall Movano, replacing the previous one, which from 1998 until 2021 had been based on the Renault Master. As well as the Toyota Proace Max from 2023 onwards.

4WD versions are available to order, which are converted by the French company Dangel using a central viscous coupling.

The Ducato is the most common motorhome base used in Europe; with around two-thirds of motorhomes using the Ducato base.

== First generation (1981) ==
First generation
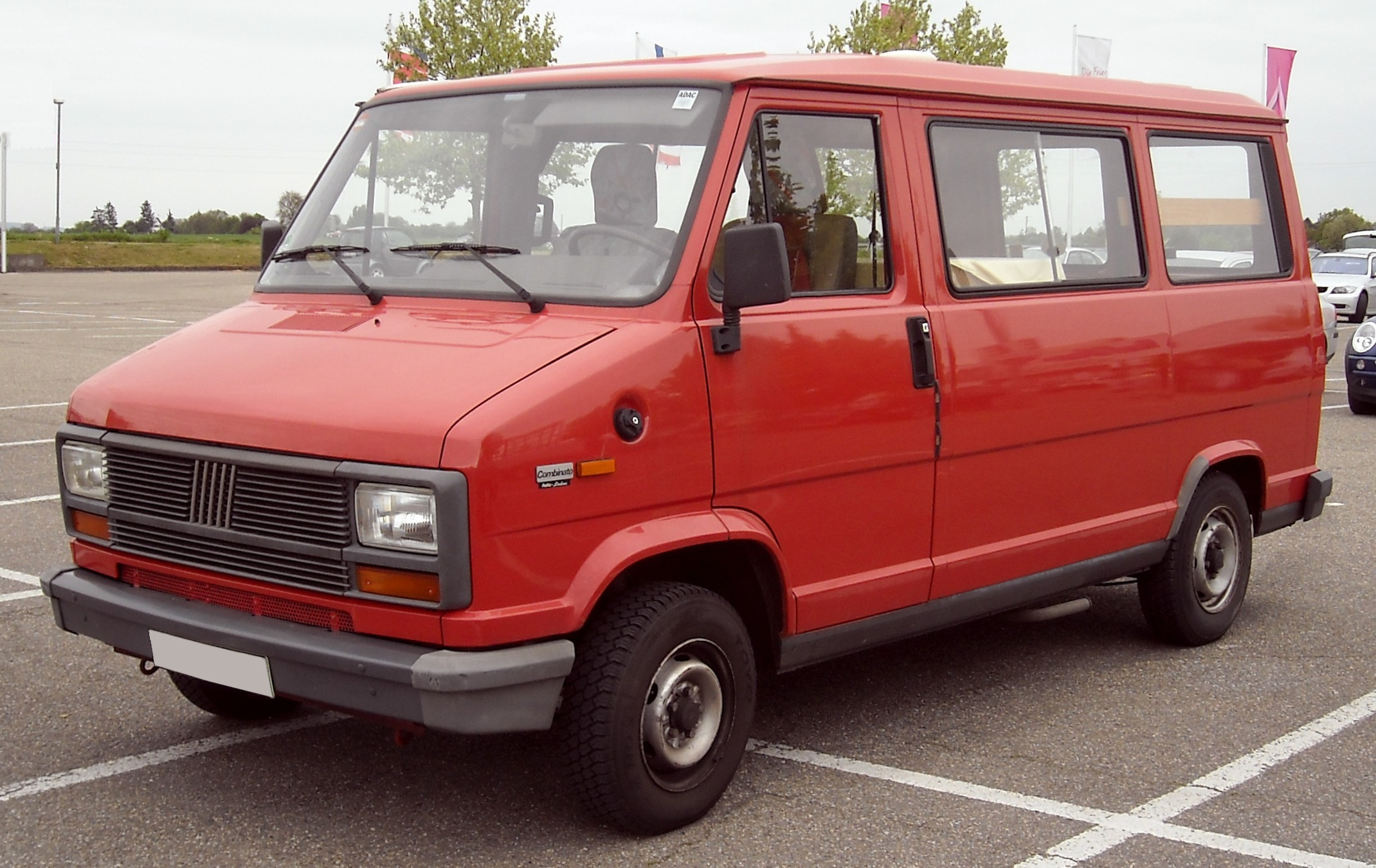
- Fiat Ducato

Overview
- Also called: Alfa Romeo AR6; Peugeot J5; Citroën C25; Fiat Talento; Talbot Express
- Production: 1981–1993
- Assembly: Val di Sangro, Atessa, Italy (Sevel Sud); Pomigliano d’Arco, Naples, Italy (Sevel Sud)

Body and chassis
- Body style: 3-door van/minibus 2-door pickup

Powertrain
- Engine: Petrol: 1.8 L PSA 169B I4; 2.0 L PSA 170 I4; Diesel: 1.9 L Fiat 149B I4; 1.9 L Fiat 280A turbo I4; 2.4/2.5 L Sofim 8144 I4; 2.4/2.5 L Sofim 8140.27 turbo I4
- Electric motor: 43 kW Leroy-Somer T29C LT250 electric motor (ELETTRA)

Dimensions
- Wheelbase: 2,917–3,659 mm (114.8–144.1 in)
- Length: 4,693–5,598 mm (184.8–220.4 in)
- Width: 1,920–2,000 mm (75.6–78.7 in)
- Height: 2,070–2,668 mm (81.5–105.0 in)
- Curb weight: 1,590–1,715 kg (3,505.3–3,780.9 lb)

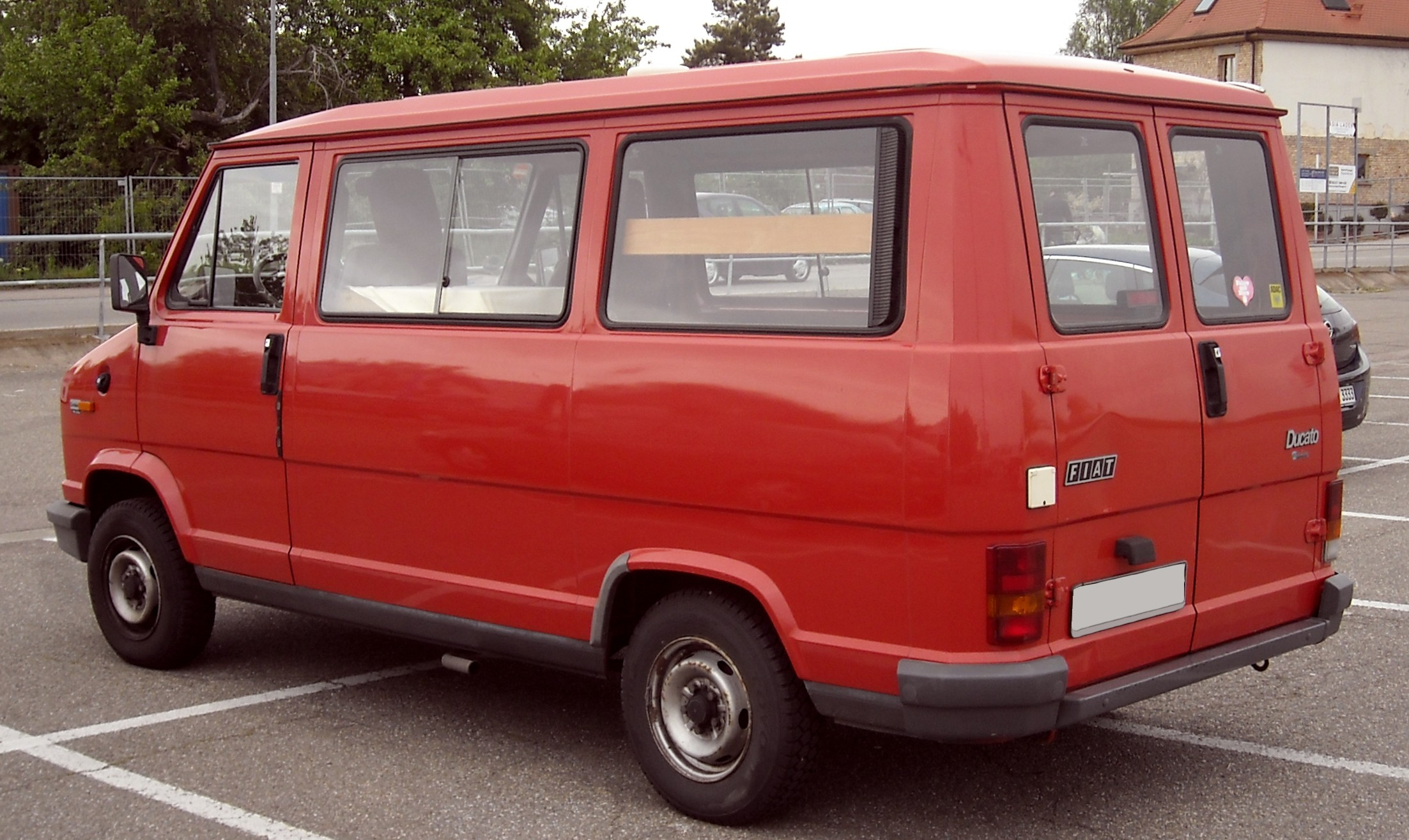
Fiat Ducato rear view

The Ducato was first launched in 1981, and was the result of Fiat's collaboration with PSA Peugeot Citroën, that resulted in the vehicle's development starting in 1978. The vehicles were manufactured at the Sevel Val di Sangro plant in Atessa, in central Italy, and at the Sevel Campania plant in Pomigliano d'Arco, Naples, together with the similar Alfa Romeo AR6, Citroën C25, and Peugeot J5 versions. The Peugeot J5 was sold as the Talbot Express in the United Kingdom (1986–1994). The collaboration of Fiat and PSA had earlier produced the Fiat 242 and Citroën C35 from 1974.

For the Fiat, engines were 1.8 and 2.0 litre 4-cylinder petrol or 1.9 litre diesel. Trim levels were base, S, and SX. Model variants were named according to carrying capacity: Ducato 10 (1.0 tons), Ducato 13 (1.3 tons), Ducato 14 (1.4 tons), and Ducato Maxi 18 (1.8 tons). The Ducato Mk1 was very popular as a basis for campervan conversions. Starting in 1990, Fiat offered the campervan manufacturers a platform developed especially for this purpose.

In August 1992, some Fiat Ducatos were built with the T29C electric DC motor from Leroy-Somer, named as the Ducato Elettra powered by 28 six-volt valve regulated lead–acid (VRLA) gel cell batteries, producing 168 volts DC and 160 amperes, in a wooden box weighing 868 kg. This 4765 × 1965 × 2100 mm transporter (maximum gross weight 3190 kg) had a vehicle payload of 750 kg and a range up to 70 kilometers.

=== Fiat Talento ===
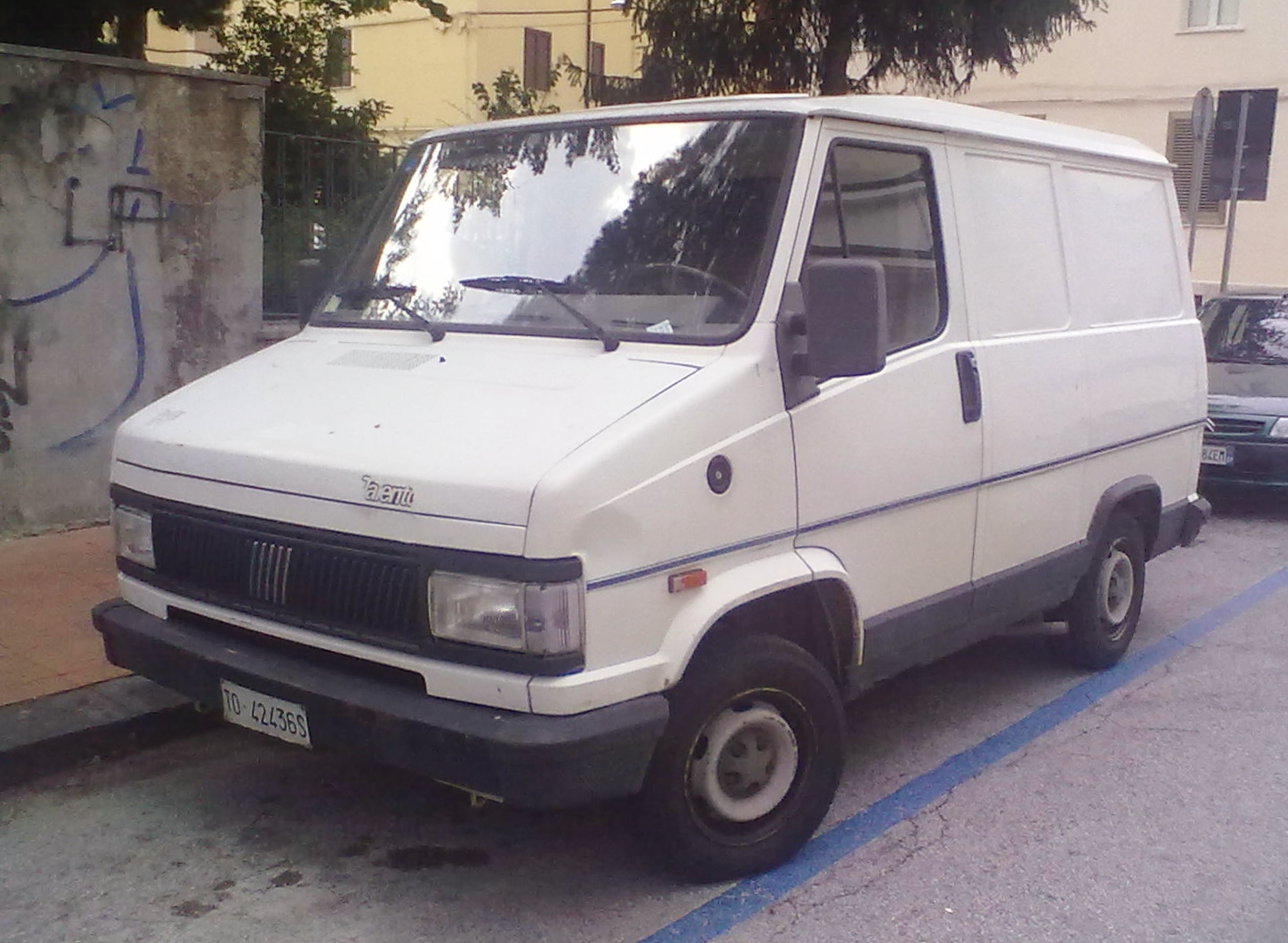
Fiat Talento (first generation)

The Fiat Talento (Italian pronunciation: [taˈlɛnto]) is a light commercial vehicle produced by the Italian automaker Fiat, first sold in 1981 as a short-wheelbase version of the Ducato. In 1994, the first generation Talento was discontinued.

It has been offered in two non-consecutive generations, as the nameplate made its return as a rebadged Renault Trafic (X82) in 2016. The name continues Fiat's practice of naming their commercial vehicles after old currencies, with "talento" referring to the talent, a unit of measurement often used for precious metals.

=== Alfa Romeo AR6 ===
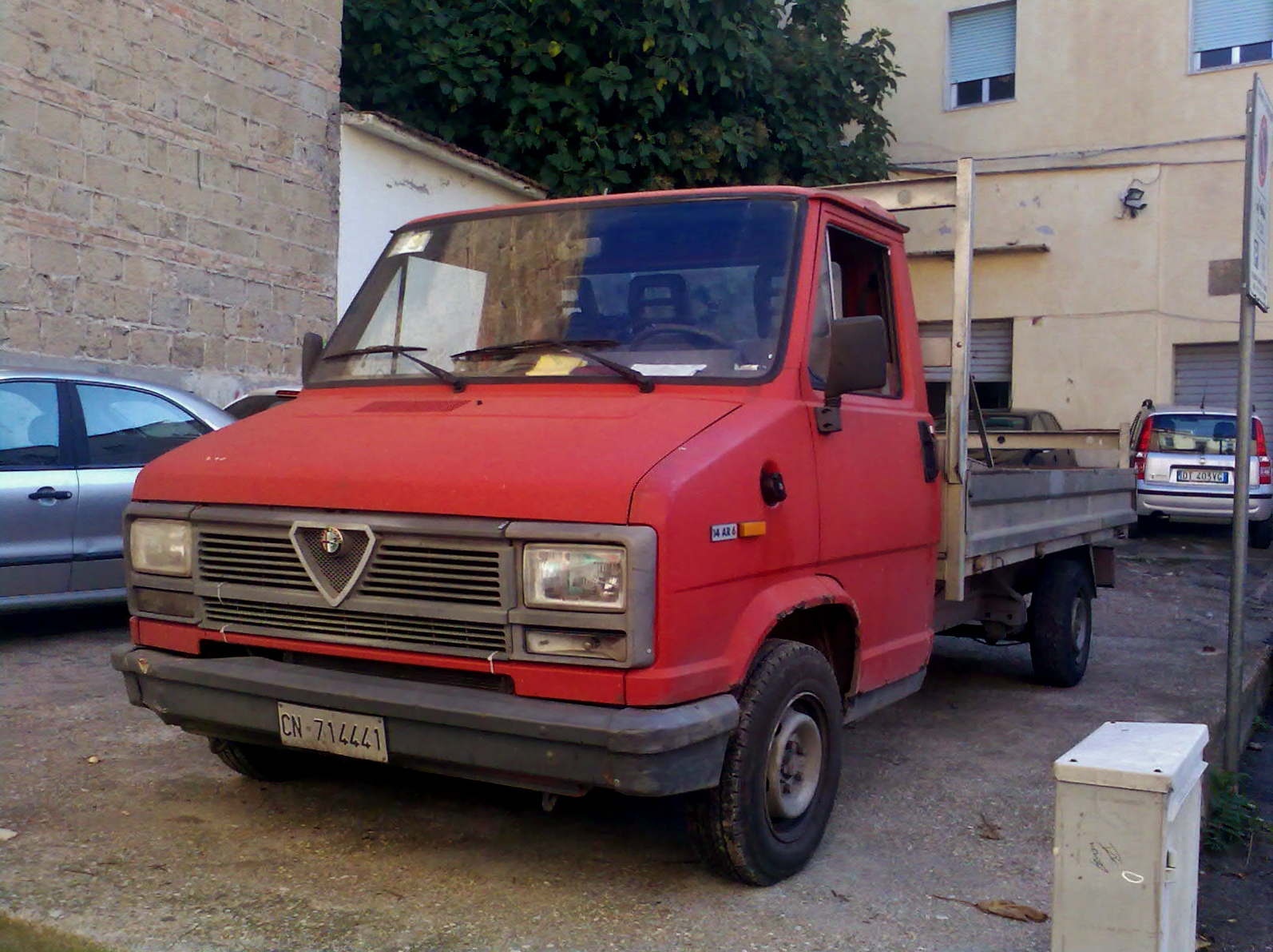
Alfa Romeo AR6

The Alfa Romeo AR6 was a badge-engineered Ducato sold by Alfa Romeo on the Italian market only, as a replacement for the Alfa Romeo Romeo. It was available in two different wheelbase lengths, and as a passenger van, commercial van, or pick-up truck. It was also the final commercial vehicle sold by Alfa Romeo. The Alfa Romeo AR6 was produced in the Sevel Campania plant (formerly owned by ARVECO – Alfa Romeo Industrial Vehicles) of Pomigliano d'Arco, Naples, until 1 January 1986, when Alfa Romeo dropped out of the commercial vehicle business entirely. Production of the Fiat Ducato continued in the same plant until 1994 when it was closed.

=== Citroën C25 ===
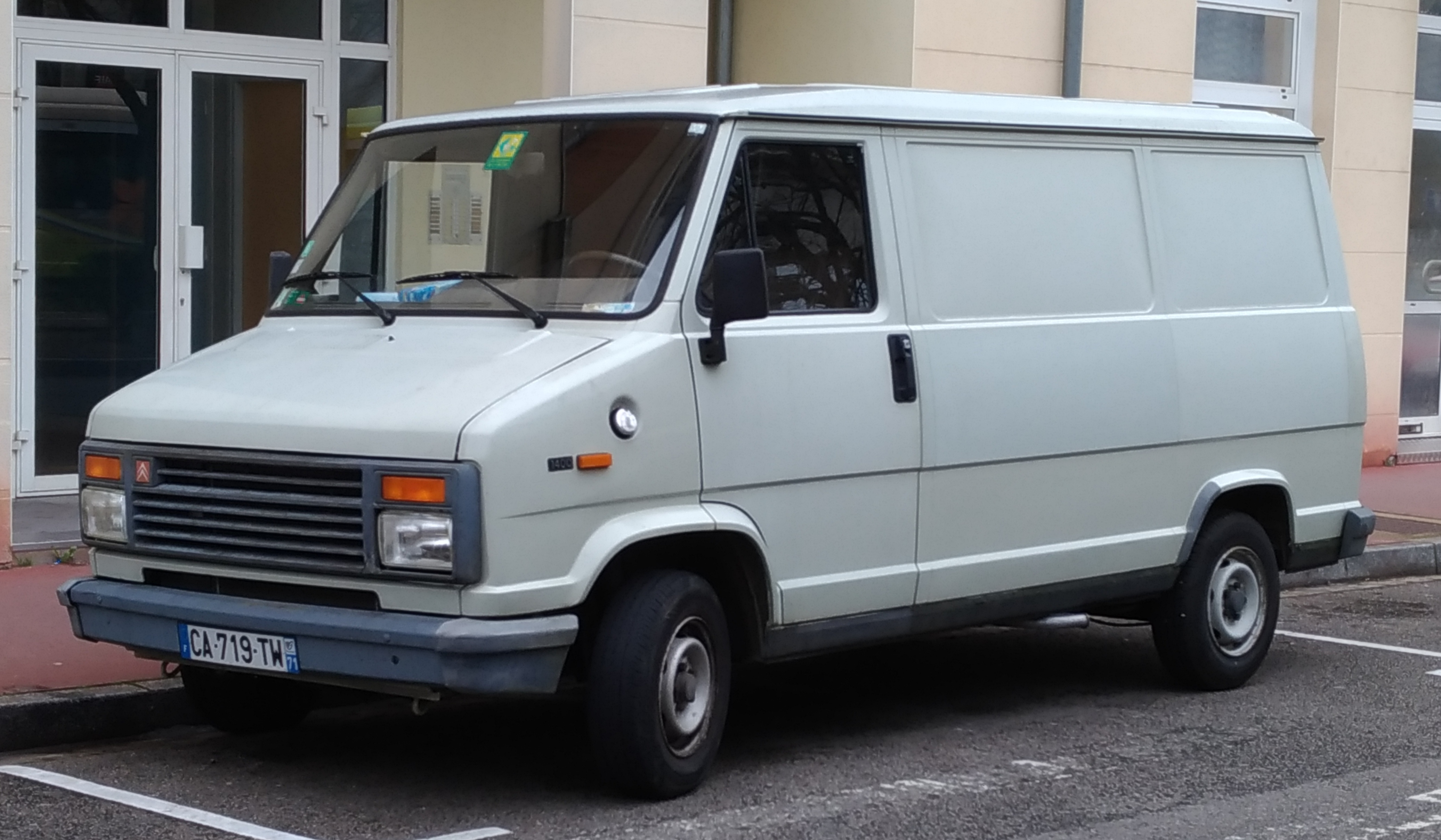
Citroën C25

The Citroën C25 was a 2.5 tonne capacity van (hence the name C25) produced from October 1981 until 1993. The C25 succeeded the dated corrugated Citroën Type H post war one tonne van. The C25's engines are transversely mounted; the petrol one is a Peugeot 504 unit whilst the diesel one is from the Citroën CX diesel. Both units are coupled to a Citroën gearbox.

In February 1982, the range was extended to include a pick-up truck and a minibus. In 1991, the C25 series 2 was launched with an enlarged grille. In 1994, the C25 was replaced by the Jumper.

=== Peugeot J5 ===
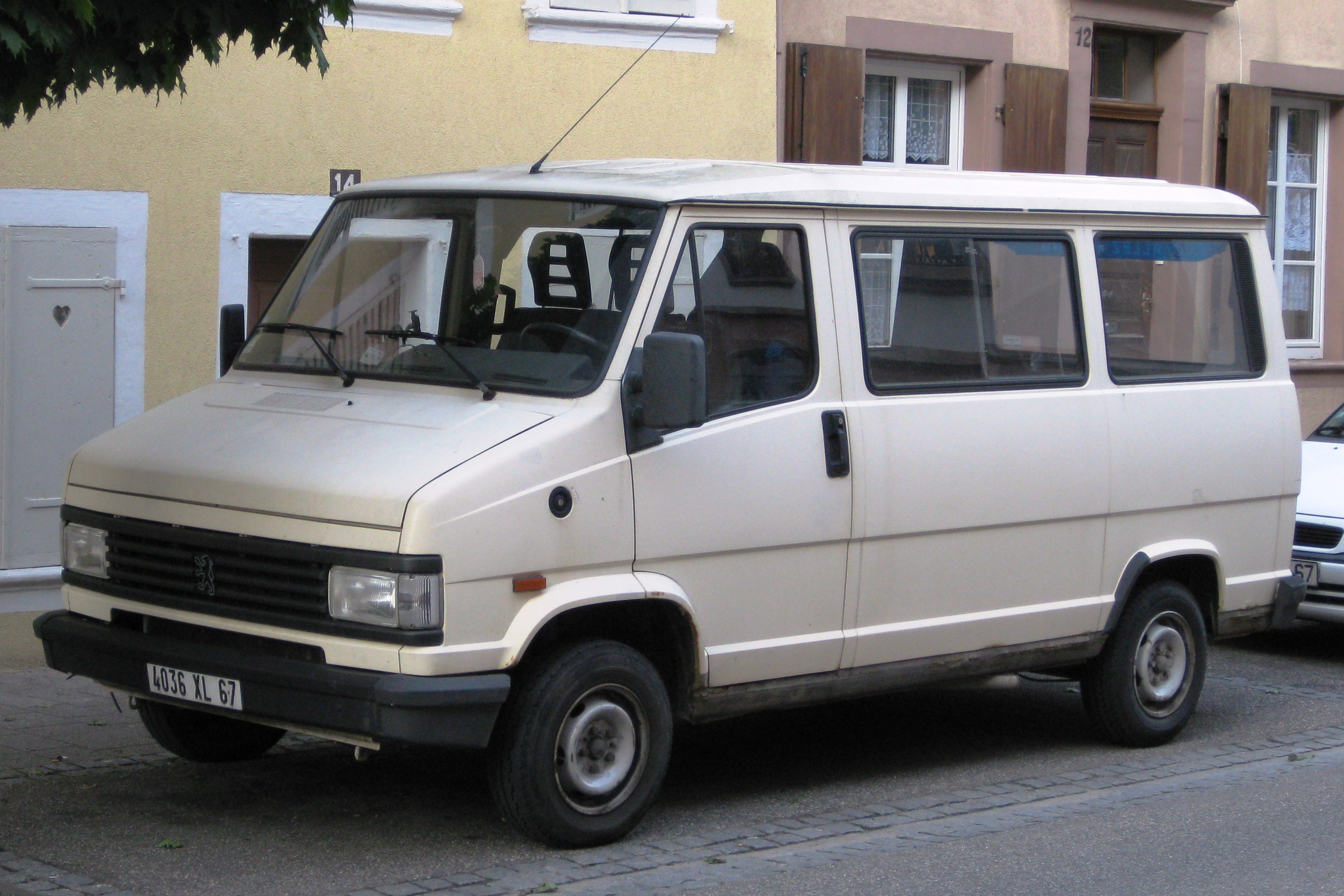
Peugeot J5

The Peugeot J5 was a 2.5 tonne capacity van, also produced from October 1981 until 1993. Its powertrains are as per the Citroën C25. In 1991, the J5 series 2 was launched with a new front grille and headlights. It was replaced in 1994 by the Peugeot Boxer, which was based on the second generation Fiat Ducato.

It sold reasonably well in France but enjoyed little commercial success outside France, being overshadowed in much of Europe by the Fiat Ducato, which was supported by stronger commercial vehicle dealership networks in key markets.

=== Talbot Express ===
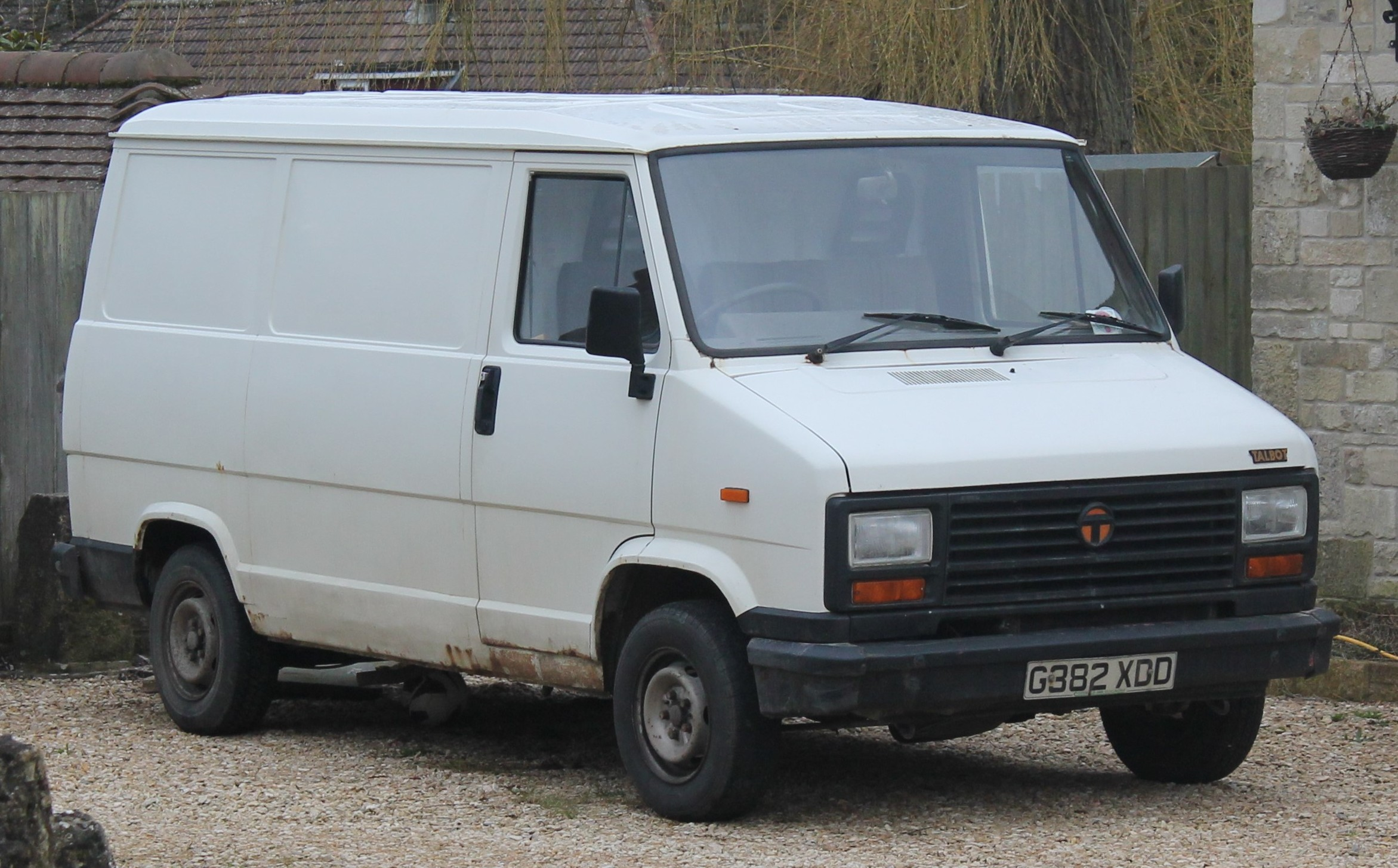
Talbot Express

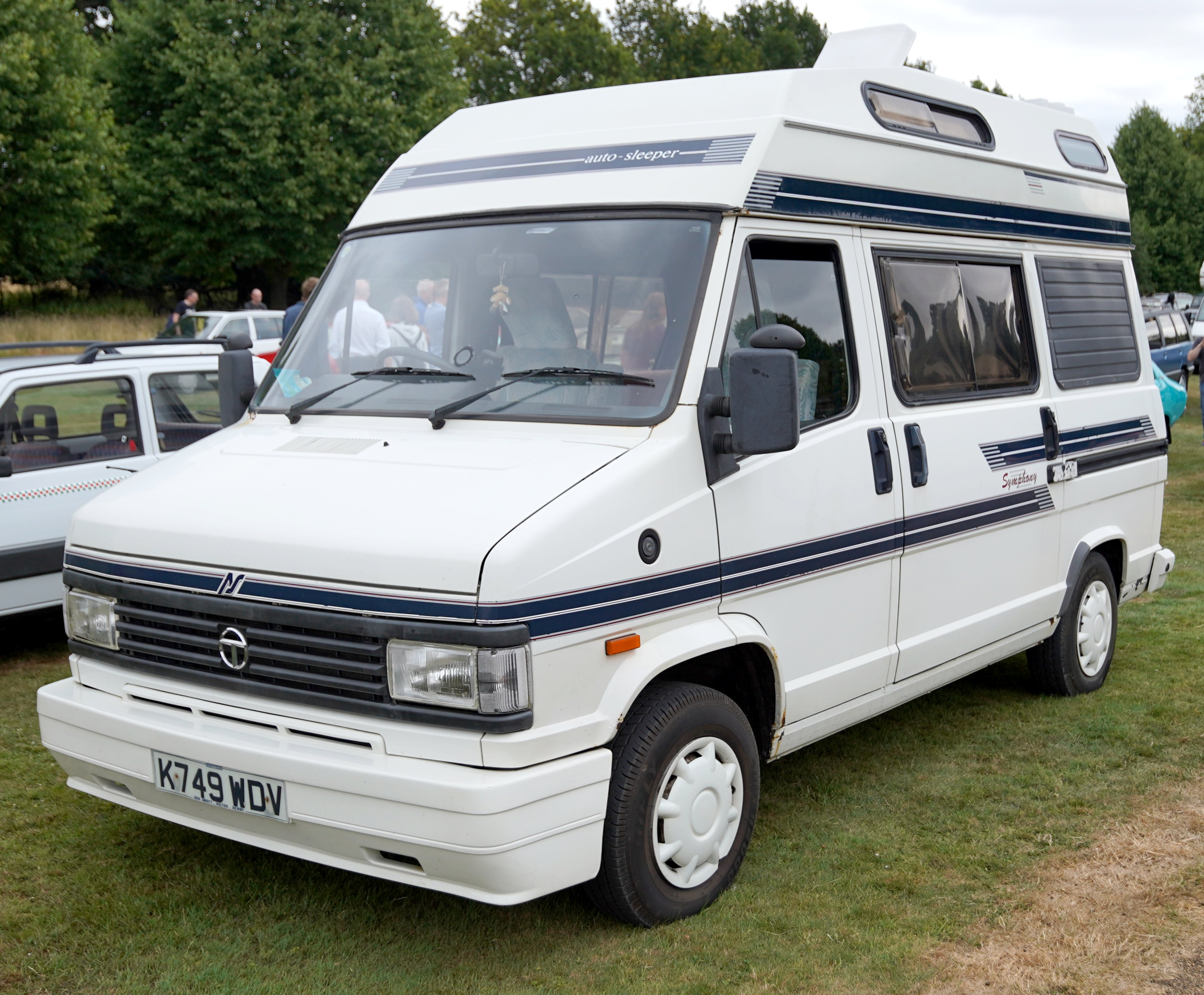
Talbot Express campervan

The Talbot Express van, sold solely in the United Kingdom, was the last Talbot-badged motor vehicle to be produced, quietly succeeding the outdated Dodge Spacevan model line. Production of this badge-engineered version for the United Kingdom began in 1982 and continued until 1994, nearly eight years after the last Talbot badged passenger car had been withdrawn.

Its Citroën/Peugeot petrol and diesel engines were transversely mounted driving the front wheels. A 4×4 option was also available, although is very rare today.

In 1991, the series 2 Express was launched with an enlarged grille. Production was discontinued in 1994, when Peugeot finally discarded the Talbot marque.

This van was popular in the United Kingdom, for new conversions to camper vans or motorhomes by coach builders. Provided they are well-maintained and not too rusty, they can still command prices of many thousands of pounds even though they are over thirty years old. This is in marked contrast to the values of the commercial van versions.

=== Engines ===
Model	Engine	Displacement	Valvetrain	Fuel system	Max. power at rpm	Max. torque at rpm
Petrol engines
1800	PSA 169B	1796 cc	OHV 8v	Carburettor	69 PS (51 kW; 68 hp) at 4800 rpm	136 N⋅m (100 lb⋅ft) at 2300 rpm
2000	PSA 170B	1971 cc	OHV 8v	Carburettor	75 PS (55 kW; 74 hp) at 5000 rpm	147 N⋅m (108 lb⋅ft) at 2500 rpm
2000	PSA 170B	1971 cc	OHV 8v	Carburettor	78 PS (57 kW; 77 hp) at 5000 rpm	152 N⋅m (112 lb⋅ft) at 2500 rpm
2000	PSA 170C	1971 cc	OHV 8v	Carburettor	86 PS (63 kW; 85 hp) at 4750 rpm	160 N⋅m (118 lb⋅ft) at 2500 rpm
2000 cat	PSA 170D	1971 cc	OHV 8v	electric Carburettor	84 PS (62 kW; 83 hp) at 4750 rpm	160 N⋅m (118 lb⋅ft) at 2500 rpm
Diesel engines
1929 D	Fiat 149B1000	1929 cc	SOHC 8v	Indirect injection	69 PS (51 kW; 68 hp) at 4600 rpm	120 N⋅m (89 lb⋅ft) at 2500 rpm
1929 TD	Fiat 280A1000	1929 cc	SOHC 8v	Indirect injection	82 PS (60 kW; 81 hp) at 4100 rpm	181 N⋅m (133 lb⋅ft) at 2500 rpm
2445 TD	Sofim 8144.21	2445 cc	SOHC 8v	Direct injection	92 PS (68 kW; 91 hp) at 3800 rpm	216 N⋅m (159 lb⋅ft) at 2200 rpm
2445 D	Sofim 8144.61	2445 cc	SOHC 8v	Indirect injection	72 PS (53 kW; 71 hp) at 4200 rpm	147 N⋅m (108 lb⋅ft) at 2400 rpm
2500 D	Sofim 8144.07	2500 cc	SOHC 8v	Direct injection	75 PS (55 kW; 74 hp) at 4200 rpm	162 N⋅m (119 lb⋅ft) at 2200 rpm
2500 D	Sofim 8144.67	2500 cc	SOHC 8v	Indirect injection	75 PS (55 kW; 74 hp) at 4200 rpm	162 N⋅m (119 lb⋅ft) at 2200 rpm
2500 TD	Sofim 8140.27	2500 cc	SOHC 8v	Direct injection	95 PS (70 kW; 94 hp) at 3800 rpm	216 N⋅m (159 lb⋅ft) at 2000 rpm
Electric engines
ELETTRA	Leroy-Somer T29C LT250	—	DC magnetic shunt	28 VRLA battery Pb-Gel batteries 6V DC 160A	58.5 PS (43.0 kW; 57.7 hp) at 1550 rpm	230 N⋅m (170 lb⋅ft) at 1550 rpm

=== Electric version ===
In August 1992, some Fiat Ducatos were built with the 43 kW (58 hp) T29C electric DC motor from Leroy-Somer, named as the Ducato Elettra powered by 28 six-volt valve regulated lead–acid (VRLA) gel cell batteries, producing 168 volts DC and 160 amperes, in a wooden box weighing 868 kg. This 4765 × 1965 × 2100 mm transporter (maximum gross weight 3190 kg) had a vehicle payload of 750 kg and a range up to 70 kilometers.

The high torque usually means that a conventional gearbox is not needed, but to keep costs down, the five-speed gearbox from the internal combustion models is retained. The top speed is 90km/h (55mph) and has a 70km (44-mi) range. Recharging takes eight hours. The motor was known for stalling if regenerative braking was used too long, likely due to preventing overheating the batteries, and the motor had to come to a standstill for around 5-10 seconds to be able to restart.

The technology was similar to the Citroën C15 Electrique, with the only difference being motor power and amount of batteries. Citroën C25 Electrique and Peugeot J5 Electrique versions were also produced in limited numbers starting in 1989, and about 300 were made.

== Second generation (1993) ==
Second generation
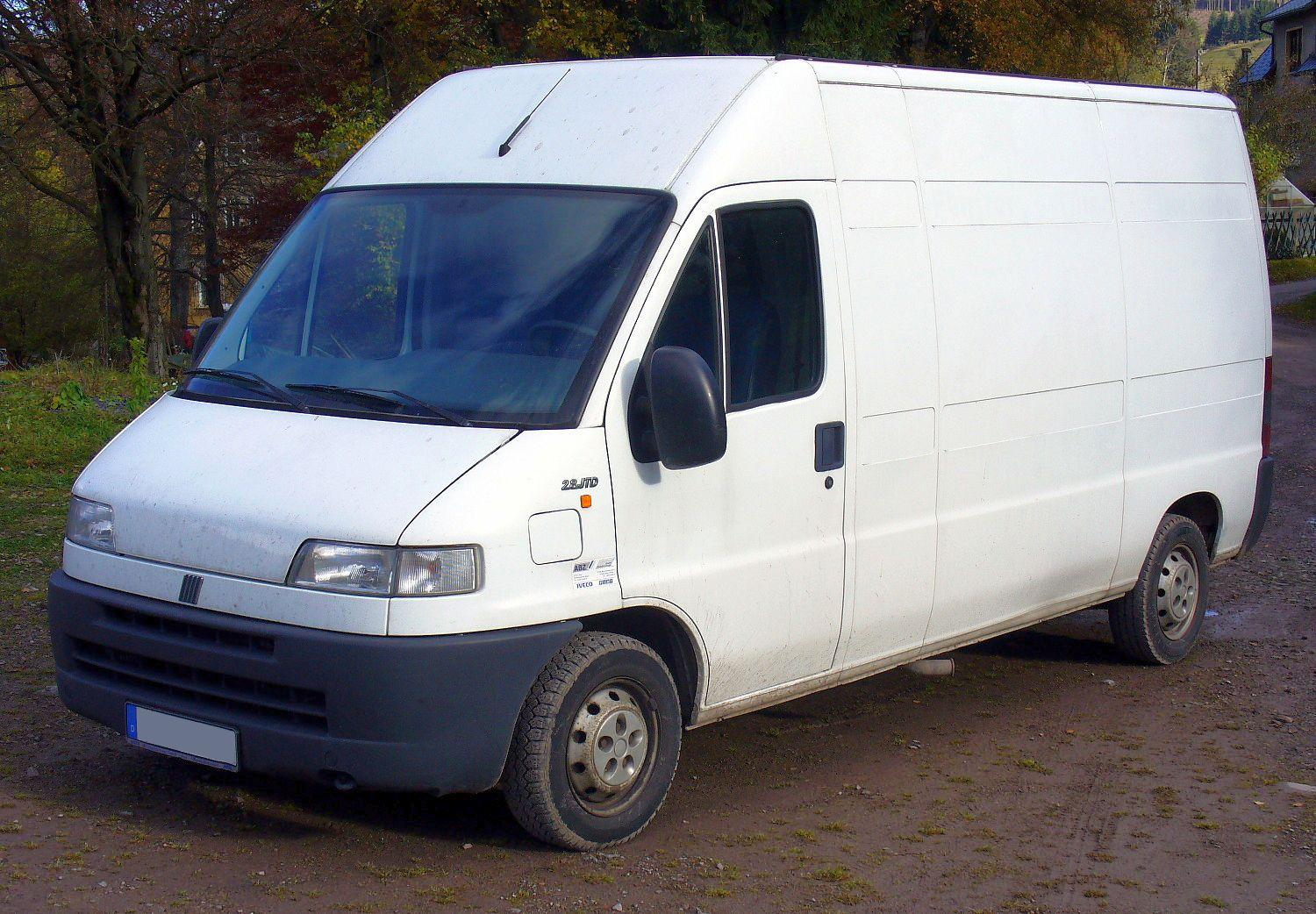
- Fiat Ducato

Overview
- Also called: Peugeot Boxer; Peugeot Manager (Mexico); Citroën Jumper; Citroën Relay (United Kingdom); Zastava Rival
- Production: 1993–2006; 2000–2016 (Brazil)
- Assembly: Val di Sangro, Atessa, Italy (Sevel Sud); Tychy, Poland (Fiat Auto Poland); Akçalar, Turkey (Karsan); Elabuga, Russia (Fiat-Sollers); Sete Lagoas, Brazil (Iveco)

Body and chassis
- Body style: 3-door van/minibus 4-door van/minibus 2/4-door pickup
- Related: Hino Poncho (1st generation)

Powertrain
- Engine: Petrol: 2.0 L PSA XU10 I4; Diesel: 1.9 L PSA XUD9 I4; 1.9 L PSA XUD9 turbo I4; 1.9 L Fiat 230A I4 (Fiat); 1.9 L Fiat 230A turbo I4 (Fiat); 2.0 L PSA DW10 turbo I4; 2.2 L PSA DW12 turbo I4 (Citroën/Peugeot); 2.3 L Sofim turbo 16v I4 (Fiat); 2.45 L PSA DJ5 12v I4 (Citroën/Peugeot); 2.45 L PSA DJ5 turbo 12v I4 (Citroën/Peugeot); 2.5 L Sofim 8140/S8U I4 (Fiat); 2.5 L Sofim 8140/S9U turbo I4 (Fiat); 2.8 L Sofim 8140/S8W I4 (Fiat); 2.8 L Sofim 8140/S9W turbo I4
- Transmission: 5-speed manual 4-speed automatic

Dimensions
- Wheelbase: 2,850–3,700 mm (112.2–145.7 in)
- Length: 4,521–5,682 mm (178.0–223.7 in)
- Width: 1,943–2,026 mm (76.5–79.8 in)
- Height: 2,087–2,860 mm (82.2–112.6 in)
- Curb weight: 1,600–1,799 kg (3,527.4–3,966.1 lb)

The second-generation Ducato arrived in 1993 and was still produced by Sevel. Peugeot changed the name from J5 to Boxer while Citroën rebranded the C25 as Jumper (sold as the "Relay" in the United Kingdom and Ireland). One engine option was a Fiat 2.5 L diesel, which was replaced with 2.8 L Iveco/Sofim engine in 1998.

The Ducato Goods Transport has a payload of 12 m^{3} and comes with a choice of four engines: the 2.0 petrol, 2.0 JTD, 2.3 JTD 16V, or 2.8 JTD. All of these conformed to the Euro 3 standards and offered programmed maintenance management. The range included two types of gearbox: a mechanical box with a five-speed manual plus reverse and an automatic transmission with four speeds plus reverse.

The Ducato Passenger Transport has a carrying capacity of six to nine people and comes with the 2.3 litre JTD 16v engine, which again is Euro 3 compliant and delivers 110 bhp.

The Ducato Combi is a mixture of the Goods Transport and the Passenger Transport. It is ideal for the transport of people and goods alike, and it can accommodate up to nine occupants. Model designations were Ducato 10 (1 ton), Ducato 14 (1.4 tons), and Ducato Maxi 18 (1.8 tons).

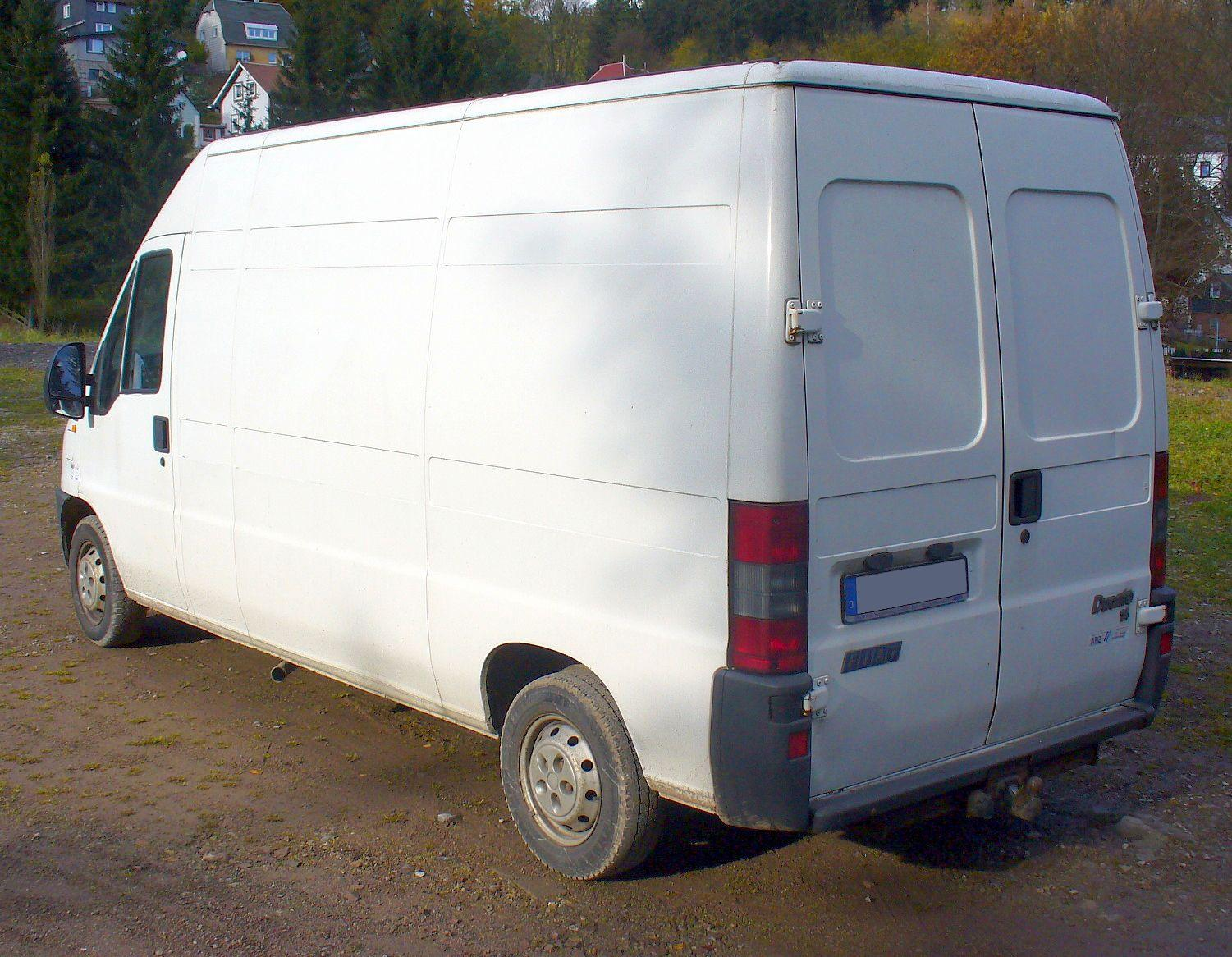
Fiat Ducato II rear view

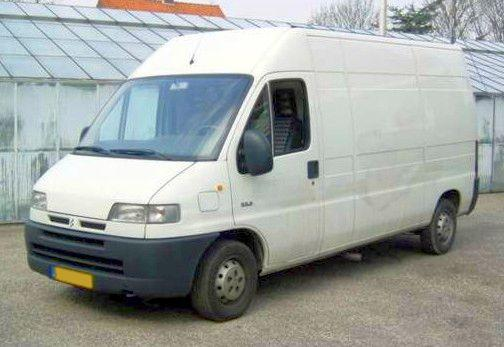
1st generation (original) Citroën Jumper

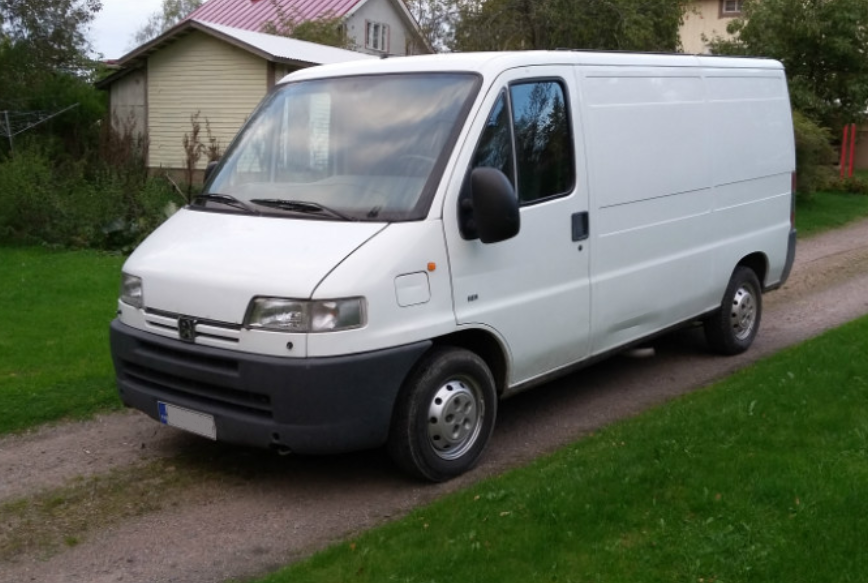
1st generation (original) Peugeot Boxer

=== 2002 facelift ===
The second series was restyled in February 2002, with the addition of rear and side bump mouldings and revised front grille. The engine range was: 2.0 JTD, 2.3 JTD 16v and 2.8 JTD, 2.5 diesel was dropped. Model designations were changed to reflect maximum gross weight: Ducato 29 (2.9 tons), Ducato 30 (3.0 tons), Ducato 33 (3.3 tons) and Ducato Maxi 35 (3.5 tons).

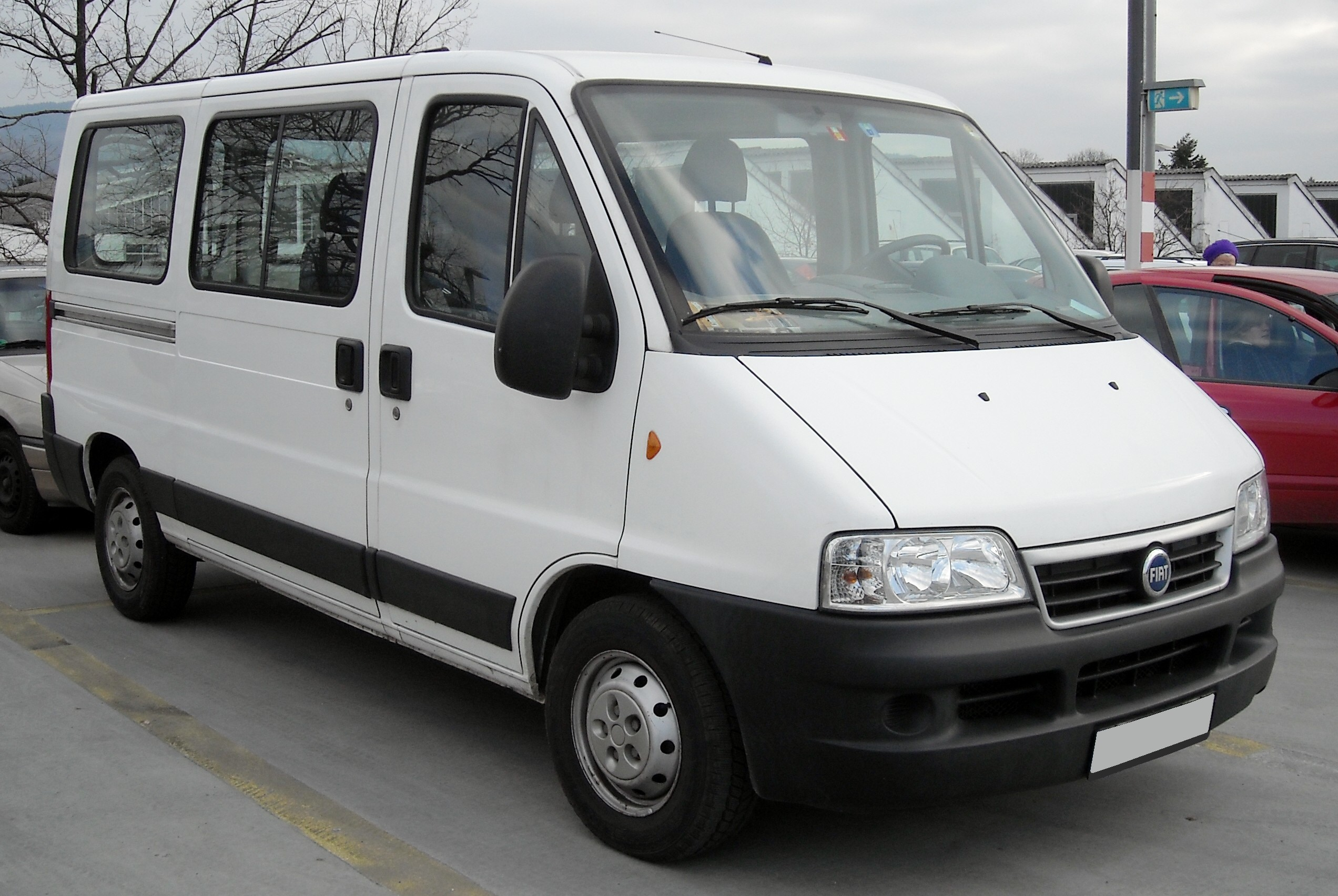
Fiat Ducato II facelift

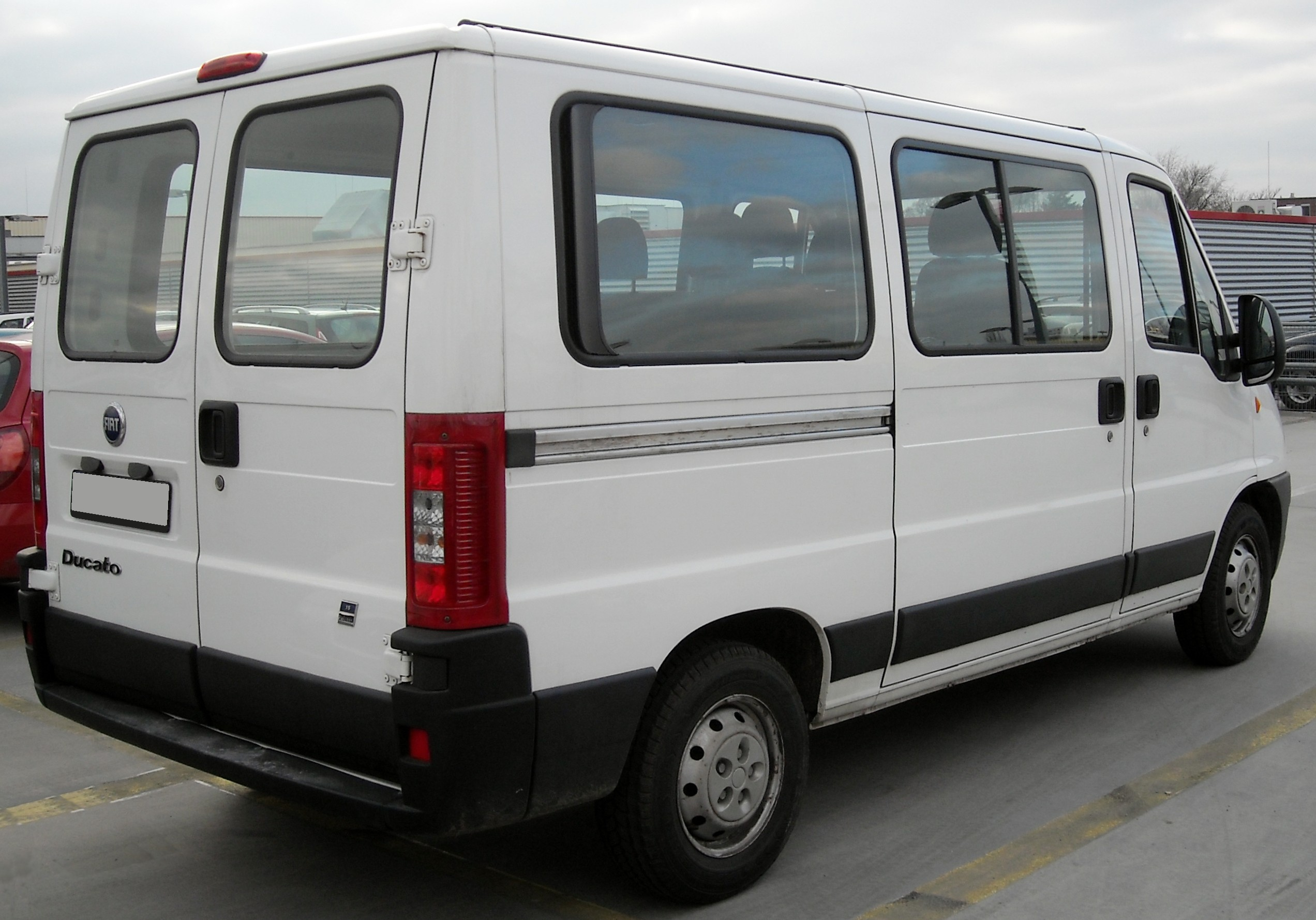
Fiat Ducato II facelift rear view

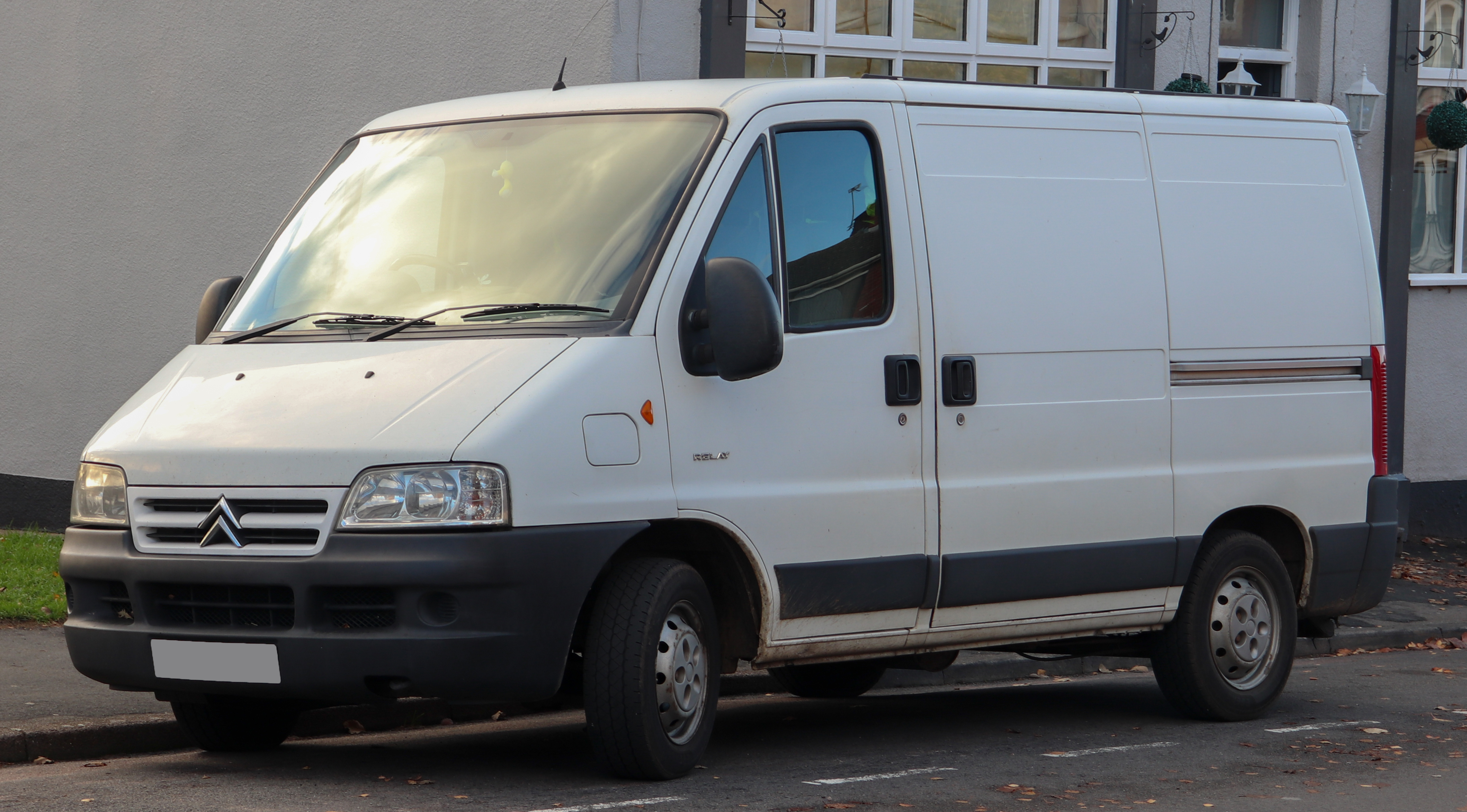
Facelifted (2nd generation) Citroën Relay (Dispatch in Australia)

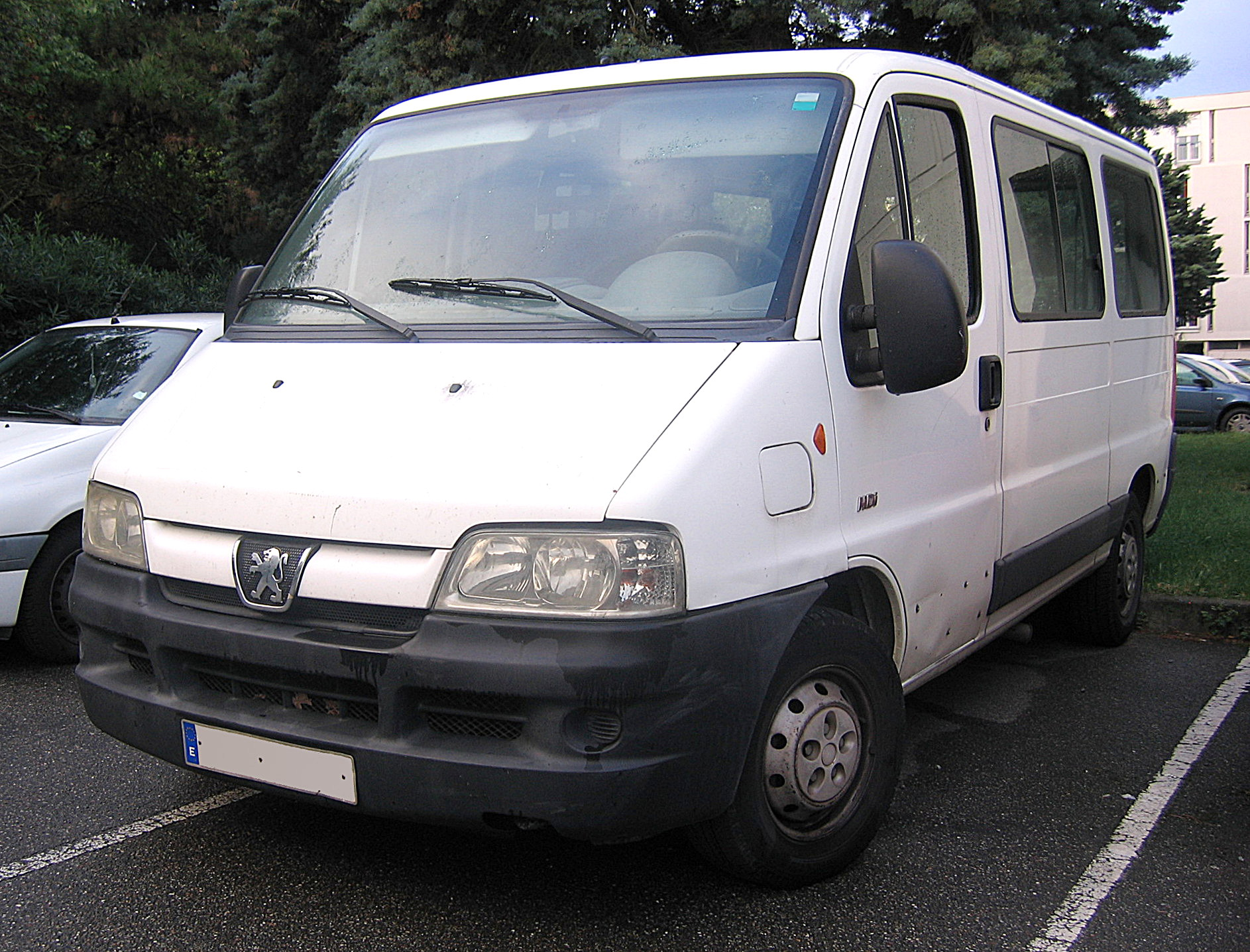
Facelifted (2nd generation) Peugeot Boxer

On 15 December 2005, the three-millionth vehicle was produced, which resulted in the rate of production increasing to nine vehicles per day. This generation was also produced at the Fiat Auto Poland Tychy plant in complete knock down, at the Iveco plant in Sete Lagoas (Brazil), at the Karsan plant in Alkaçar, Turkey, since 2000, and since 2006 in Elabuga, Russia (Fiat-Sollers).

The Ducato, Jumper, and Boxer were also produced in Brazil until December 2016.

=== Engines ===
==== 1993–1999 ====
Model	Engine	Displacement	Valvetrain	Fuel system	Max. power at rpm	Max. torque at rpm	Years
Petrol engines
2.0 i.e.	PSA RFW	1,998 cc	SOHC 8v	Multi-point fuel injection	109 PS (80 kW; 108 hp) @ 5,500 rpm	168 N⋅m (124 lb⋅ft) @ 3,400 rpm	1994–1999
2.0 i.e.^{2}	PSA RFW	1,998 cc	SOHC 8v	Multi-point fuel injection	109 PS (80 kW; 108 hp) @ 5,500 rpm	168 N⋅m (124 lb⋅ft) @ 3,400 rpm	2004
Diesel engines
1.9 D^{1}	Fiat 230A2000	1,929 cc	SOHC 8v	Indirect injection	69 PS (51 kW; 68 hp) @ 4,600 rpm	120 N⋅m (89 lb⋅ft) @ 2,500 rpm	1994–1999
1.9 D^{2}	PSA D8C	1,905 cc	SOHC 8v	Indirect injection	69 PS (51 kW; 68 hp) @ 4,600 rpm	120 N⋅m (89 lb⋅ft) @ 2,000 rpm	1994–1999
1.9 TD^{1}	Fiat 230A3000	1,929 cc	SOHC 8v	Indirect injection	82 PS (60 kW; 81 hp) @ 4,200 rpm	180 N⋅m (133 lb⋅ft) @ 2,500 rpm	1994–1999
1.9 TD cat^{1}	Fiat 230A4000	1,929 cc	SOHC 8v	Indirect injection	80 PS (59 kW; 79 hp) @ 4,200 rpm	175 N⋅m (129 lb⋅ft) @ 2,500 rpm	1994–1999
1.9 TD^{2}	PSA D8B	1,905 cc	SOHC 8v	Indirect injection	92 PS (68 kW; 91 hp) @ 4,000 rpm	196 N⋅m (145 lb⋅ft) @ 2,250 rpm	1994–1999
2.5 D^{1}	Iveco 8140.67	2,500 cc	SOHC 8v	Indirect injection	84 PS (62 kW; 83 hp) @ 4,200 rpm	164 N⋅m (121 lb⋅ft) @ 2,400 rpm	1994–1998
2.5 D^{2}	PSA T9A	2,446 cc	SOHC 12v	Indirect injection	86 PS (63 kW; 85 hp) @ 4,350 rpm	153 N⋅m (113 lb⋅ft) @ 2,250 rpm	1994–1999
2.5 TD^{2}	PSA T8A	2,446 cc	SOHC 12v	Indirect injection	103 PS (76 kW; 102 hp) @ 4,200 rpm	230 N⋅m (170 lb⋅ft) @ 2,200 rpm	1994–1998
2.5 TD^{2}	PSA THX	2,446 cc	SOHC 8v	Direct injection	107 PS (79 kW; 106 hp) @ 4,000 rpm	235 N⋅m (173 lb⋅ft) @ 2,250 rpm	1998–1999
2.5 TDI^{1}	Iveco 8140.47	2,500 cc	SOHC 8v	Direct injection	116 PS (85 kW; 114 hp) @ 3,800 rpm	245 N⋅m (181 lb⋅ft) @ 2,000 rpm	1994–1998
2.5 TDI cat^{1}	Iveco 8140.47R	2,500 cc	SOHC 8v	Direct injection	109 PS (80 kW; 108 hp) @ 3,800 rpm	256 N⋅m (189 lb⋅ft) @ 2,200 rpm	1994–1998
2.8 D^{1}	Iveco 8140.63	2,800 cc	SOHC 8v	Indirect injection	87 PS (64 kW; 86 hp) @ 3,800 rpm	180 N⋅m (133 lb⋅ft) @ 2,000 rpm	1998–1999
2.8 i.d. TD	Iveco 8140.43	2,800 cc	SOHC 8v	Direct injection	122 PS (90 kW; 120 hp) @ 3,600 rpm	285 N⋅m (210 lb⋅ft) @ 1,800 rpm	1998–1999

^{1} Only for Fiat Ducato
^{2} Only for Citroën Jumper and Peugeot Boxer

==== 2000–2001 ====
Model	Engine	Displacement	Valvetrain	Fuel system	Max. power at rpm	Max. torque at rpm	Years
Petrol engines
2.0 i.e.	PSA RFW	1,998 cc	SOHC 8v	Multi-point fuel injection	109 PS (80 kW; 108 hp) @ 5,500 rpm	168 N⋅m (124 lb⋅ft) @ 3,400 rpm	2000–2001
2.0 i.e.^{1}	PSA RFW	1,998 cc	SOHC 8v	Multi-point fuel injection	109 PS (80 kW; 108 hp) @ 5,500 rpm	168 N⋅m (124 lb⋅ft) @ 3,400 rpm	2004–2009
Diesel engines
1.9 D	PSA DJY	1,905 cc	SOHC 8v	Indirect injection	68 PS (50 kW; 67 hp) @ 4,600 rpm	120 N⋅m (89 lb⋅ft) @ 2,000 rpm	2000–2001
1.9 TD	PSA DHY	1,905 cc	SOHC 8v	Indirect injection	90 PS (66 kW; 89 hp) @ 4,000 rpm	196 N⋅m (145 lb⋅ft) @ 2,250 rpm	2000–2001
2.0 JTD/HDi	PSA RHV	1,997 cc	SOHC 8v	Common rail direct injection	84 PS (62 kW; 83 hp) @ 4,000 rpm	192 N⋅m (142 lb⋅ft) @ 1,900 rpm	2000–2001
2.5 D^{1}	PSA T9A	2,446 cc	SOHC 12v	Indirect injection	86 PS (63 kW; 85 hp) @ 4,350 rpm	153 N⋅m (113 lb⋅ft) @ 2,250 rpm	2000–2001
2.5 TD^{1}	PSA THX	2,446 cc	SOHC 8v	Direct injection	107 PS (79 kW; 106 hp) @ 4,000 rpm	235 N⋅m (173 lb⋅ft) @ 2,250 rpm	2000
2.8 D^{2}	Iveco 8140.63	2,800 cc	SOHC 8v	Indirect injection	87 PS (64 kW; 86 hp) @ 3,800 rpm	180 N⋅m (133 lb⋅ft) @ 2,000 rpm	2000–2001
2.8 i.d. TD	Iveco 8140.43	2,800 cc	SOHC 8v	Direct injection	122 PS (90 kW; 120 hp) @ 3,600 rpm	285 N⋅m (210 lb⋅ft) @ 1,800 rpm	2000–2001
2.8 JTD/HDi	Iveco 8140.43S	2,800 cc	SOHC 8v	Common rail direct injection	128 PS (94 kW; 126 hp) @ 3,600 rpm	300 N⋅m (221 lb⋅ft) @ 1,800 rpm	2000–2001

^{1} Only for Citroën Jumper and Peugeot Boxer
^{2} Only for Fiat Ducato

==== 2002–2006 ====
Model	Engine	Displacement	Valvetrain	Fuel system	Max. power at rpm	Max. torque at rpm	Years
Petrol engines
2.0 i.e.	PSA RFL	1,998 cc	SOHC 8v	Multi-point fuel injection	110 PS (81 kW; 108 hp) @ 5,700 rpm	168 N⋅m (124 lb⋅ft) @ 3,700 rpm	2002–2006
2.0 i.e. natural power CNG	PSA RFL	1,998 cc	SOHC 8v	Multi-point fuel injection	110 PS (81 kW; 108 hp) @ 5,700 rpm	168 N⋅m (124 lb⋅ft) @ 3,700 rpm	2002–2003
2.0 i.e. G power LPG	PSA RFL	1,998 cc	SOHC 8v	Multi-point fuel injection	110 PS (81 kW; 108 hp) @ 5,700 rpm	168 N⋅m (124 lb⋅ft) @ 3,700 rpm	2002–2006
2.0 i.e. natural power CNG^{1}	PSA RFL	1,998 cc	SOHC 8v	Multi-point fuel injection	110 PS (81 kW; 108 hp) @ 5,700 rpm	168 N⋅m (124 lb⋅ft) @ 3,700 rpm	2009–2013
Diesel engines
2.0 JTD/HDi	PSA RHV	1,997 cc	SOHC 8v	Common rail direct injection	84 PS (62 kW; 83 hp) @ 4,000 rpm	192 N⋅m (142 lb⋅ft) @ 1,900 rpm	2002–2006
2.2 HDi^{1}	PSA 4HY	2,179 cc	SOHC 8v	Common rail direct injection	101 PS (74 kW; 100 hp) @ 4,000 rpm	240 N⋅m (177 lb⋅ft) @ 1,900 rpm	2002–2006
2.3 JTD^{2}	Iveco F1AE0481C	2,286 cc	DOHC 16v	Common rail direct injection	110 PS (81 kW; 108 hp) @ 3,600 rpm	270 N⋅m (199 lb⋅ft) @ 1,800 rpm	2002–2006
2.3 Multijet (Brazil)	Iveco	2,286 cc	DOHC 16V	Common rail direct injection	127 PS (93 kW; 125 hp)		2009
2.8 JTD/HDi	Iveco 8140.43S	2,800 cc	SOHC 8v	Common rail direct injection	128 PS (94 kW; 126 hp) @ 3,600 rpm	300 N⋅m (221 lb⋅ft) @ 1,800 rpm	2002–2006
2.8 JTD/HDi Power	Iveco 8140.43N	2,800 cc	SOHC 8v	Common rail direct injection	146 PS (107 kW; 144 hp) @ 3,600 rpm	310 N⋅m (229 lb⋅ft) @ 1,500 rpm	2004–2006

^{1} Only for Citroën Jumper and Peugeot Boxer
^{2} Only for Fiat Ducato

== Third generation (2006) ==
Third generation
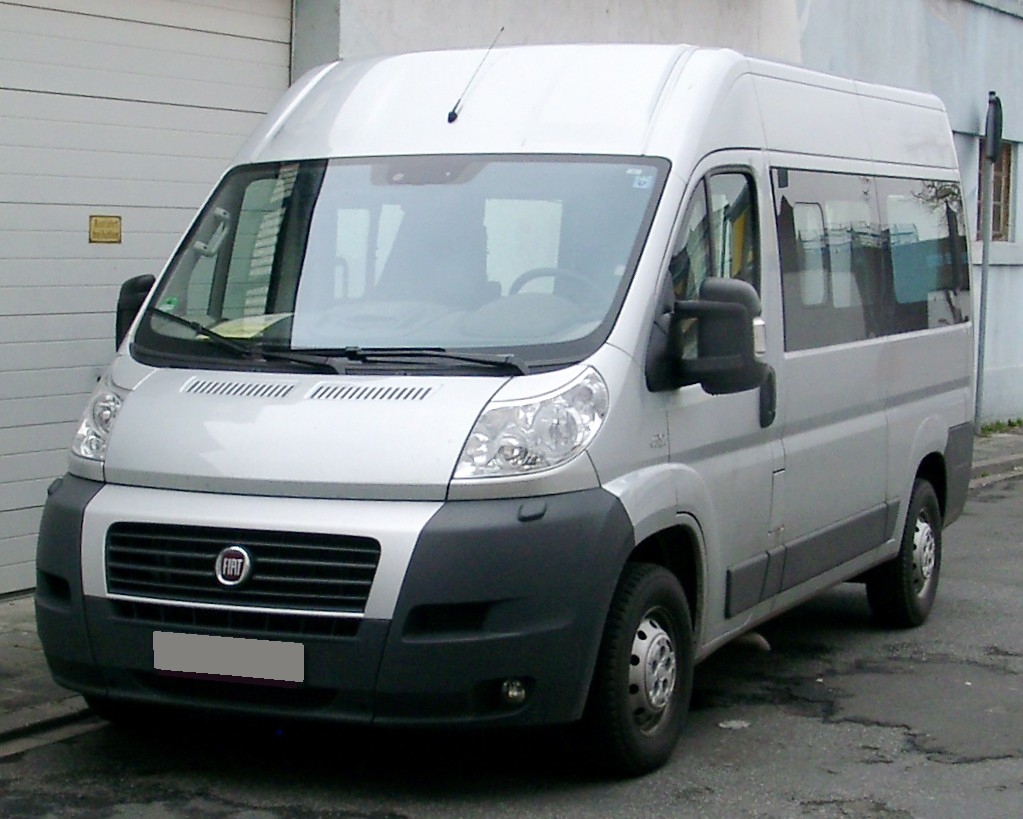

Overview
- Model code: 250
- Also called: Peugeot Boxer; Peugeot Manager (Mexico); Citroën Relay (United Kingdom); Citroën Jumper; Ram ProMaster (North America, 2014–present); Opel Movano (2021–present); Vauxhall Movano (2021–present); Zastava Rival; Toyota Proace Max (2023–present); Zenith Electric Van; Maxwell Vehicles ePro; Iveco eSuperJolly (2025–present)
- Production: September 2006 – present (Europe); January 2007 – present (Latin-America); May 2014 – present (North America)
- Model years: 2014–present (North America)
- Assembly: Italy: Atessa (Sevel Sud); Mexico: Saltillo (Saltillo Van Assembly); Poland: Gliwice (Opel Poland)
- Designer: Mike Robinson

Body and chassis
- Body style: 3-door van/minibus 4-door van/minibus 2-door pickup
- Platform: X250
- Chassis: Large van Minibus; Camper car Box van Chassis cab Platform cab Dropside truck

Powertrain
- Engine: Petrol: 3.6 L Pentastar V6; Petrol/CNG: 3.0 L Iveco F1C I4; Diesel: 2.0 L Fiat Multijet I4; 2.0 L PSA DW10 FU I4; 2.2 L PSA DW12 RU I4; 2.2 L Ford ZSD I4; 2.2 L Fiat Multijet B22 I4; 2.3 L Iveco F1A I4; 3.0 L Iveco F1C I4
- Electric motor: 90 kW, 280 Nm synchronous permanent magnet motor (E-Ducato); 200 kW, 400 Nm (Toyota Proace Max Electric)
- Transmission: 6-speed automated manual M40MTA FCA 62TE automatic 9-speed ZF 9HP48 automatic 8-speed automatic (Toyota Proace Max)
- Battery: 3 modules (47kWh); 5 modules (79kWh) lithium-ion (E-Ducato); 110 kWh (Toyota Proace Max Electric and Ram ProMaster EV)
- Electric range: 420km WLTP (Toyota Proace Max Electric)

Dimensions
- Wheelbase: SWB Relay/Jumper: 3,000 mm (118.1 in); SWB: 3,450 mm (135.8 in); LWB: 4,035 mm (158.9 in); MWB (Truck Only): 3,800 mm (149.6 in)
- Length: SWB Relay/Jumper: 4,963 mm (195.4 in); Boxer/Manager Chassis Cab: 6,208 mm (244.4 in); SWB Truck Relay/Jumper: 5,258 mm (207.0 in); SWB Truck: 5,358 mm (210.9 in); MWB Truck: 5,708 mm (224.7 in); MWB Truck Relay/Jumper: 5,608 mm (220.8 in); LWB Truck: 5,943 mm (234.0 in); LWB Truck XL: 6,308 mm (248.3 in); SWB: 5,413 mm (213.1 in); LWB: 5,998 mm (236.1 in) & 6,363 mm (250.5 in); LWB Truck: 5,843 mm (230.0 in); LWB Truck XL: 6,208 mm (244.4 in)
- Width: 2,025 mm (79.7 in)
- Height: SWB: 2,524 mm (99.4 in) & 2,764 mm (108.8 in); Truck: 2,254 mm (88.7 in); Boxer/Manager Truck: 2,153 mm (84.8 in); Boxer/Manager Van: 2,522 mm (99.3 in)
- Curb weight: 1,900–2,150 kg (4,188.8–4,739.9 lb)

The third-generation Jumper/Relay was launched first in worldwide except in Australia in September 2006 as a 2007 model (including the UK) and then in Australia in late 2012 as a 2013 model, followed by the Boxer in June and the Ducato later as a 2008 model. The vehicle was available in many variants both for people and goods transport. Weights were again increased, with the following designations for all-up weight: Ducato 30 (3 tonnes), Ducato 33 (3.3 tonnes), Ducato Maxi 35 (3.5 tonnes) and Ducato Maxi 40 (4 tonnes). In van configuration, the vehicle is available in three wheelbases: 3,000 mm (118 in), 3,450 mm (136 in), and 4,050 mm (159 in), and in three heights: 2,250 mm (89 in), 2,500 mm (98 in), and 2,750 mm (108 in). Also in van configuration, the three wheelbases are offered in four overall vehicle lengths of 4,950 mm (195 in), 5,400 mm (213 in), 6,000 mm (236 in), and 6,350 mm (250 in). The two longest body lengths are available only with the 4050 mm wheelbase.

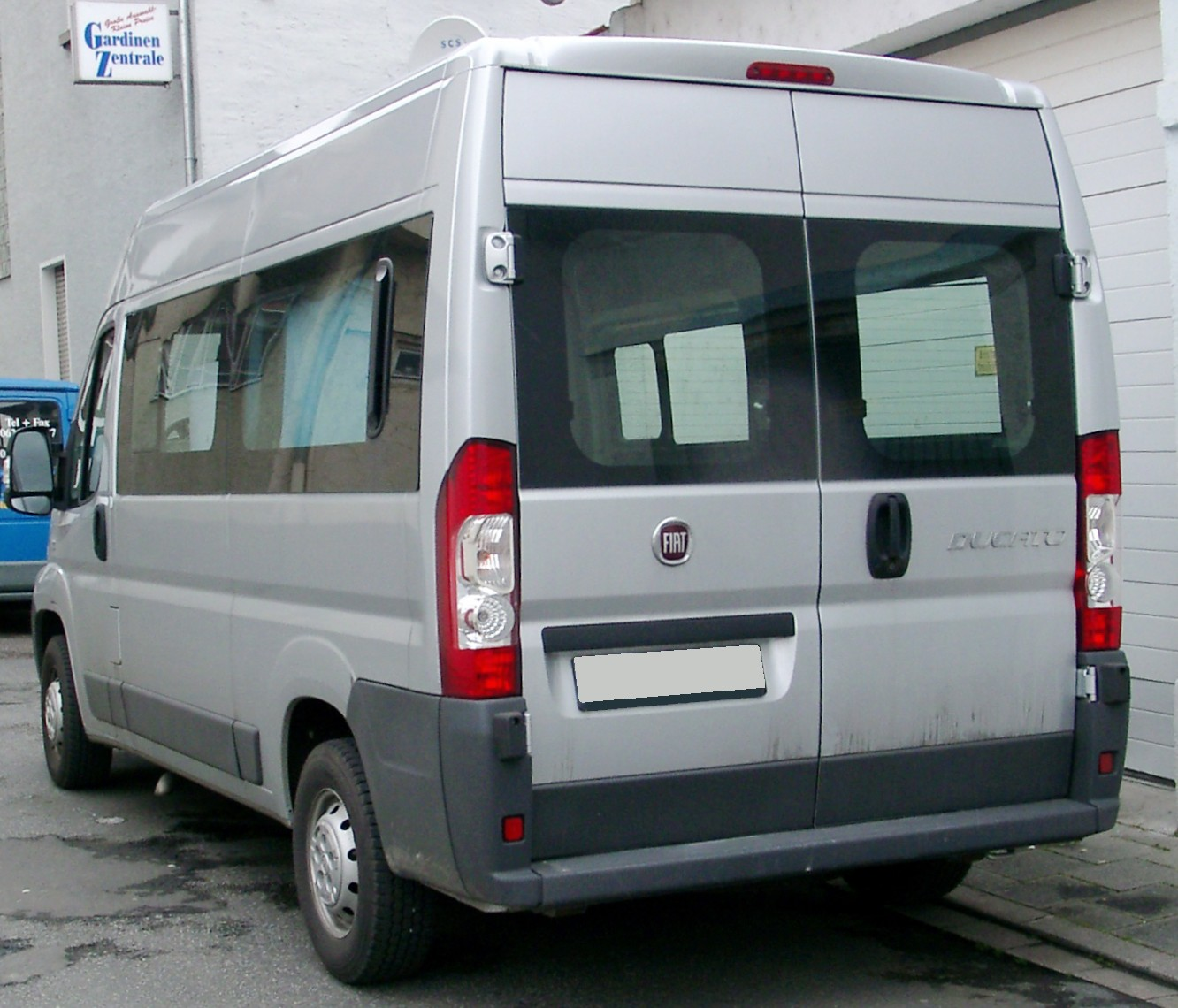
Rear view (pre-facelift)

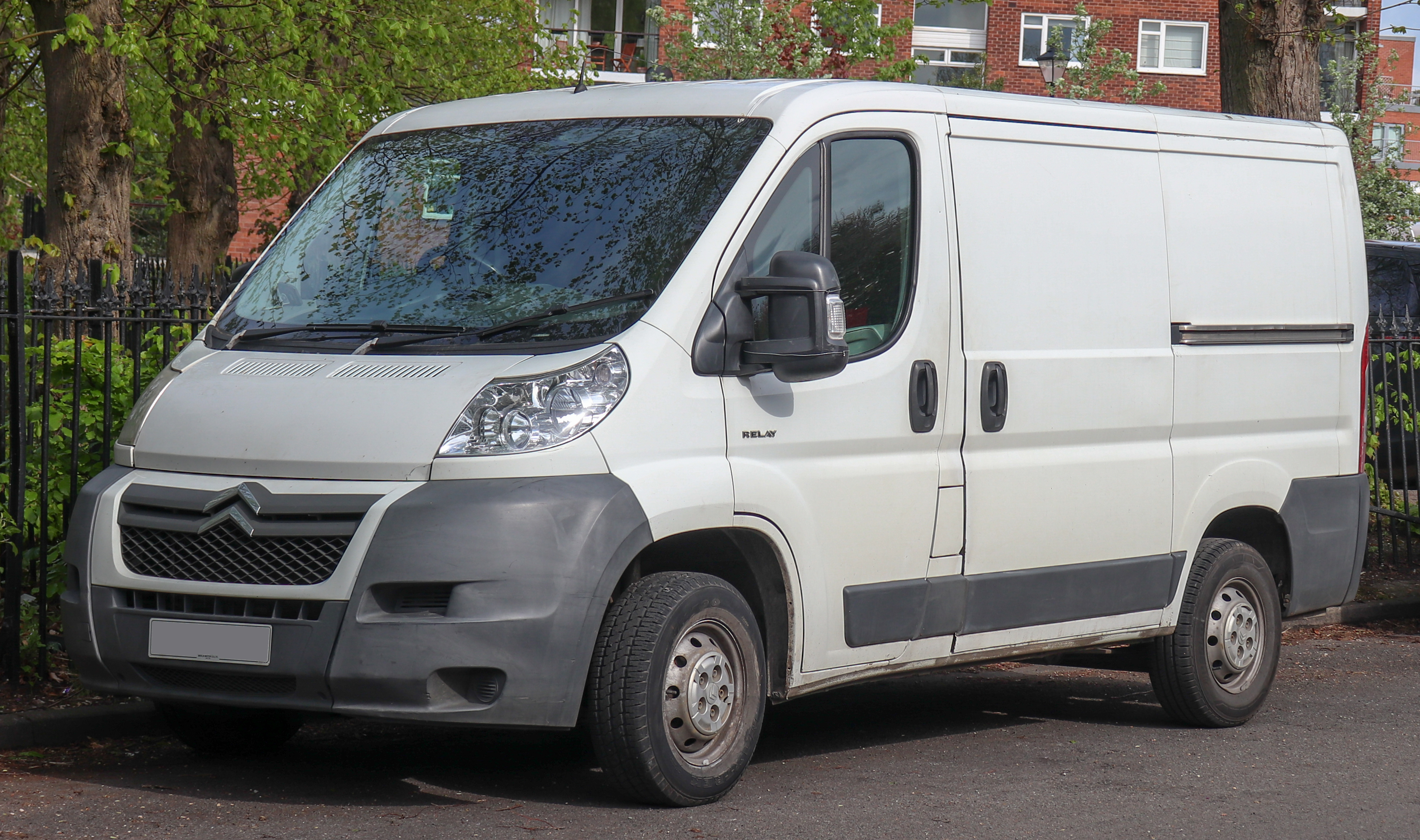
Citroën Relay (pre-facelift)

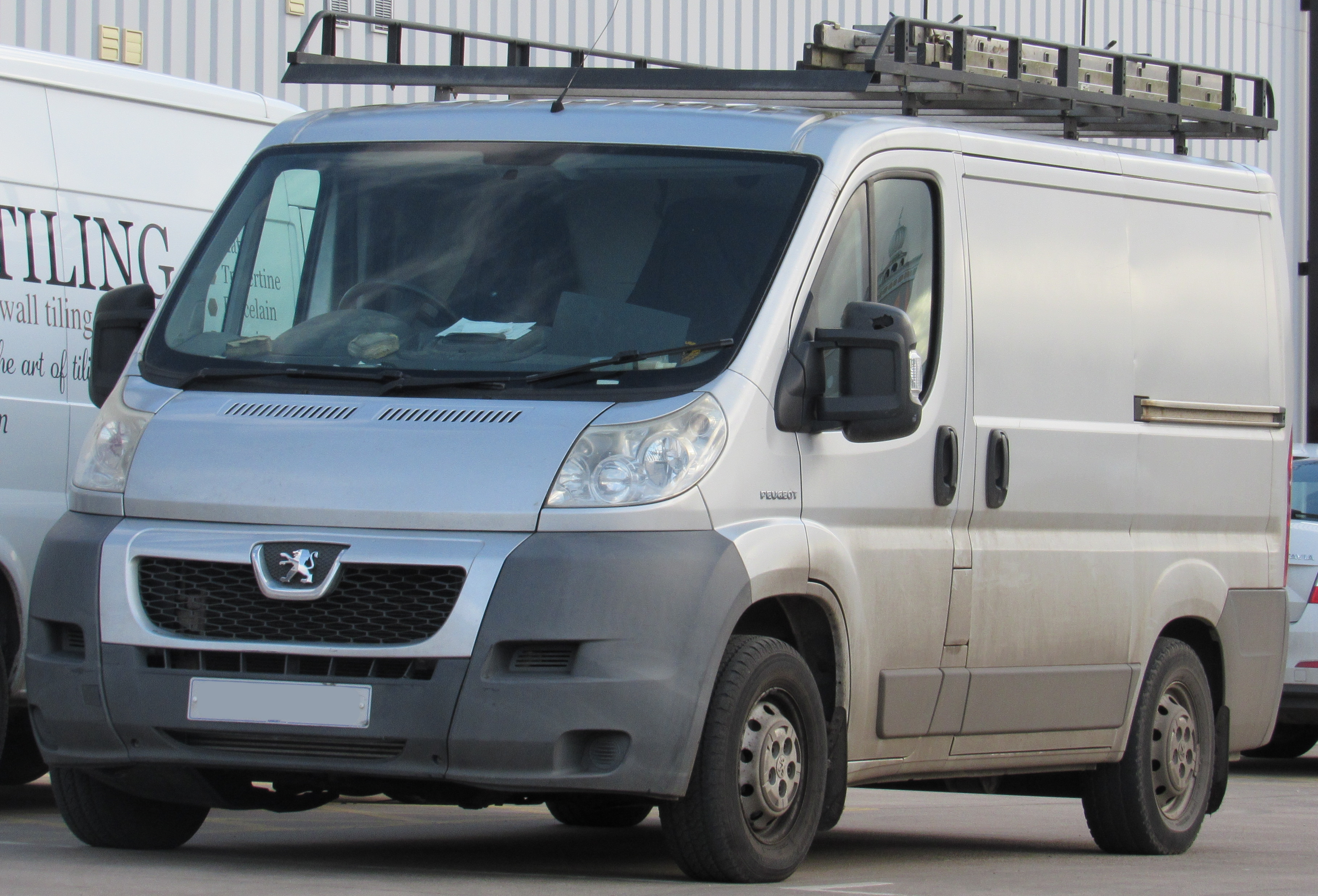
Peugeot Boxer (pre-facelift)

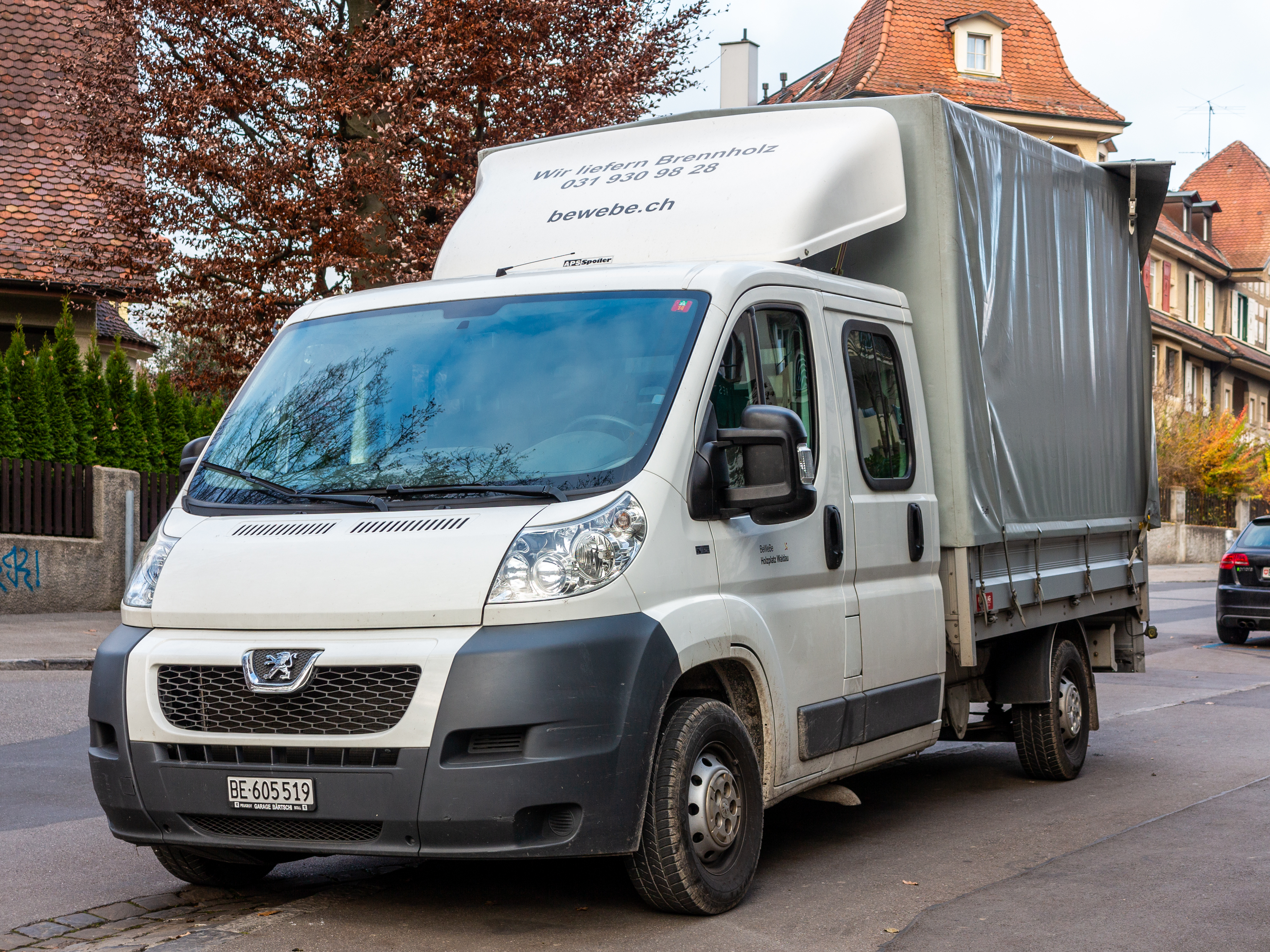
Peugeot Boxer II with crew cab

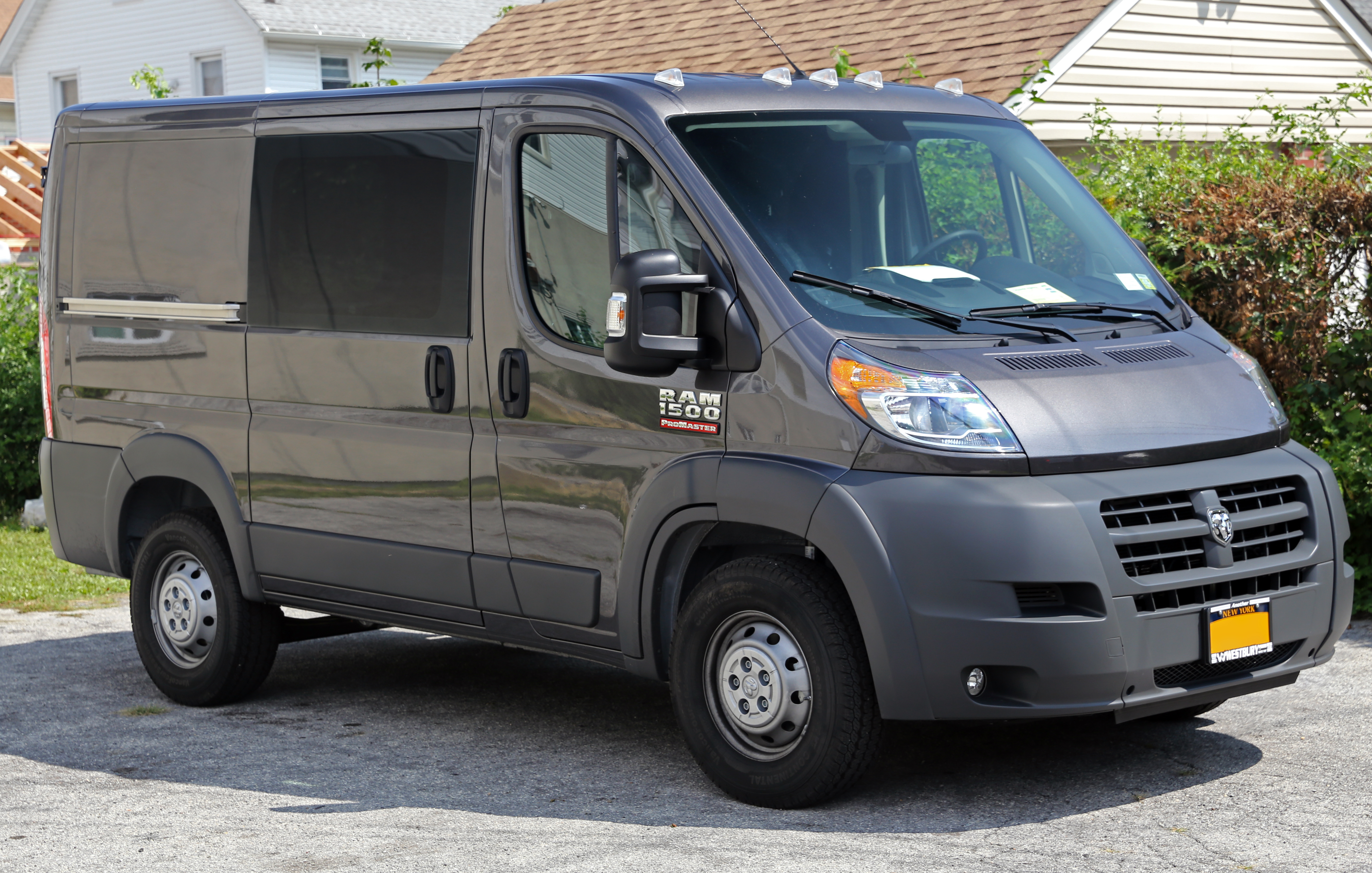
Ram ProMaster 1500

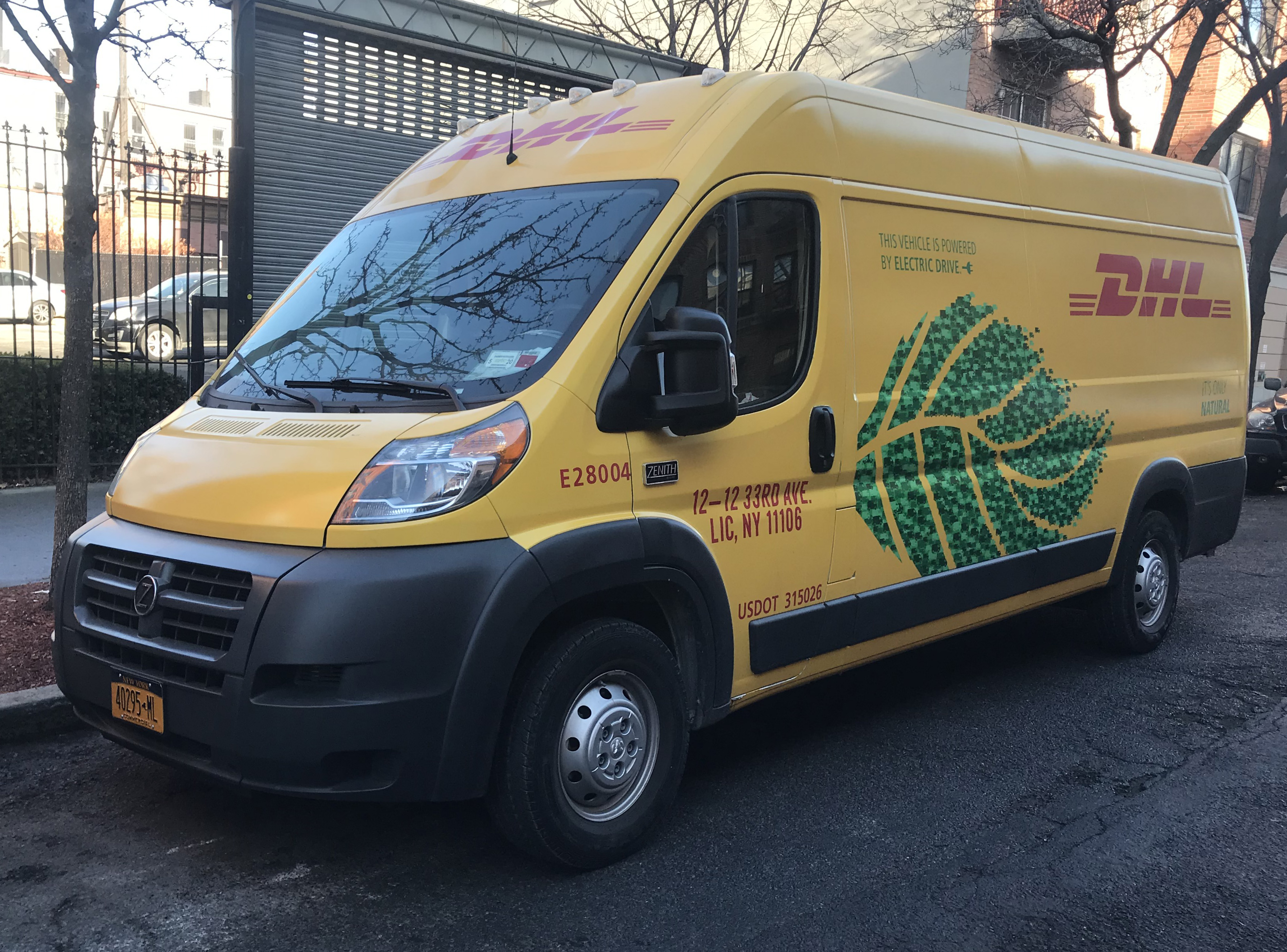
Zenith Electric Van

=== Mexico ===
This third-generation Ducato has been available in Mexico since November 2007, and over 30 different models are available. It is marketed as the Fiat Ducato, and as the Peugeot Manager. These models are similar to the European configurations with smaller engines, available diesel, and manual transmissions, although the Canada and U.S. version, with larger gasoline engines and automatic transmissions, is made in Mexico.

=== Ram ProMaster ===
Since October 2013, Fiat Chrysler Automobiles's Ram Trucks brand has marketed the Ducato as the Ram ProMaster in Canada, Mexico and the United States. Since the 2009 bankruptcy of Chrysler and subsequent acquisition by Fiat, Chrysler had not offered a large van in this market. Dodge Trucks (the brand name used by Chrysler prior to the inception of the Ram brand) had offered a version of the Mercedes-Benz Sprinter van between 2003 and 2009, and earlier the Dodge Ram Van. The ProMaster is produced in FCA's Saltillo Van Assembly Plant in Saltillo, Mexico.

Traditional commercial vans in this market are heavy body-on-frame based on pickup trucks. The ProMaster has a unibody construction and front-wheel drive. This gives it a lower floor height, which improves cargo loading. Front-wheel drive also improves handling and safety.

The most significant difference between the ProMaster and the Ducato is the availability of a 3.6 L 24-valve V6 gasoline Chrysler Pentastar engine offered in conjunction with the Chrysler 62TE six-speed automatic transmission as standard equipment. The Iveco 3.0 L 16-valve I4 diesel JTD engine, branded as EcoDiesel by Chrysler, mated with the "comfort-matic" M40MTA six-speed automated manual transmission was offered in model years 2014 through 2016; however, the gasoline V6 is currently the sole engine available in the ProMaster. Starting in the 2021 model year, the standard engine is the 3.6 L 24-valve V6 gasoline Pentastar Upgrade engine, in conjunction with the 9-speed ZF 9HP48 automatic replacing the Chrysler 62TE transmission.

The ProMaster is offered in three wheelbases (118-inch (3,000 mm), 135.8-inch (3,450 mm), 158.9-inch (4,040 mm)), four overall body lengths (195-inch (5,000 mm), 213-inch (5,400 mm), 236-inch (6,000 mm), 250-inch (6,400 mm), with the two longest body lengths available only with the 159-inch (4,000 mm) wheelbase). Only the low (89-inch (2,300 mm) and medium 99-inch (2,500 mm)) heights are offered on the ProMaster.

The panel van configuration is available in all sizes, while the chassis-cab and cut-away configurations are offered only in 136-inch (3,500 mm) and 159-inch (4,000 mm) wheelbases. The window van is available only in the 159-inch (4,000 mm) wheelbase and 99-inch (2,500 mm) roof height.

For the 2019 model year, the ProMaster received a new front fascia, replacing the crosshair grille with a new "RAM"-lettered front grille. The 3.0L EcoDiesel inline four-cylinder (I4) turbodiesel engine was also discontinued, leaving the 3.6L Pentastar V6 gasoline engine with variable valve timing (VVT) as the only engine choice for the ProMaster. The previously optional five-inch Uconnect 3 touchscreen radio was made standard equipment to comply with the Federal Motor Vehicle Safety Standards (FMVSS) requiring that all vehicles with GVWR of 10,000 lb (4,536 kg) or less manufactured after April 2018 provide a rearview camera.

At the 2020 Work Truck Show in Indianapolis, Indiana, Ram introduced the 2021 model year ProMaster with new features. A 9.2-inch digital rearview mirror with a rear camera is available as an option. New safety features include blind spot monitoring (BLIS) with rear cross-path detection and a forward collision warning system (FCWS) with emergency brake assist. LED interior lighting for the interior courtesy and ambient interior lighting is also available.

For the 2023 model year, the Ram ProMaster received a second facelift to match the styling of the other post-facelift models.

In early 2024, the Ram ProMaster EV was unveiled. This electric vehicle is equipped with a 110 kWh battery and a 270 hp (201 kW) motor.

=== Engines ===
==== 2007–2010 ====
Model	Engine	Displacement	Valvetrain	Fuel system	Max. power at rpm	Max. torque at rpm
Diesel engines
100 Multijet/2.2 HDi	Ford Puma	2,198 cc	DOHC 16v	Common rail direct fuel injection	100 PS (74 kW; 99 hp) at 2,900 rpm	250 N⋅m (184 lb⋅ft) at 1,500 rpm
120 Multijet^{1}	Iveco F1AE0481D	2,287 cc	DOHC 16v	Common rail direct fuel injection	120 PS (88 kW; 118 hp) at 3,600 rpm	320 N⋅m (236 lb⋅ft) at 2,000 rpm
2.2 HDi^{2}	Ford Puma	2,198 cc	DOHC 16v	Common rail direct fuel injection	120 PS (88 kW; 118 hp) at 3,500 rpm	320 N⋅m (236 lb⋅ft) at 2,000 rpm
130 Multijet^{1}	Iveco F1AE0481N	2,287 cc	DOHC 16v	Common rail direct fuel injection	130 PS (96 kW; 128 hp) at 3,600 rpm	320 N⋅m (236 lb⋅ft) at 2,000 rpm
160 Multijet/3.0 HDi	Iveco F1CE0481D	2,999 cc	DOHC 16v	Common rail direct fuel injection	157 PS (115 kW; 155 hp) at 3,500 rpm	400 N⋅m (295 lb⋅ft) at 1,400 rpm
CNG engines
140 Natural Power	Iveco F1C	2,999 cc	DOHC 16v	MPI Indirect injection	136 PS (100 kW; 134 hp) at 2,700 rpm	350 N⋅m (258 lb⋅ft) at 1,500 rpm

^{1} Only for Fiat Ducato
^{2} Only for Citroën Jumper and Peugeot Boxer

==== 2010–2014 ====
Model	Engine	Displacement	Valvetrain	Fuel system	Max. power at rpm	Max. torque at rpm
Diesel engines
2.2 HDi^{1}	Ford Puma	2,198 cc	DOHC 16v	Common rail direct fuel injection	110 PS (81 kW; 108 hp) at 3,500 rpm	250 N⋅m (184 lb⋅ft) at 1,750 rpm
2.2 HDi^{1}	Ford Puma	2,198 cc	DOHC 16v	Common rail direct fuel injection	130 PS (96 kW; 128 hp) at 3,500 rpm	320 N⋅m (236 lb⋅ft) at 2,000 rpm
2.2 HDi^{1}	Ford Puma	2,198 cc	DOHC 16v	Common rail direct fuel injection	150 PS (110 kW; 148 hp) at 3,500 rpm	350 N⋅m (258 lb⋅ft) at 1,750 rpm
115 Multijet^{2}	FPT Family B 250A1000	1,956 cc	DOHC 16v	Common rail direct fuel injection	115 PS (85 kW; 113 hp) at 3,700 rpm	280 N⋅m (207 lb⋅ft) at 1,500 rpm
130 Multijet^{2}	Iveco F1AE3481D	2,287 cc	DOHC 16v	Common rail direct fuel injection	130 PS (96 kW; 128 hp) at 3,600 rpm	320 N⋅m (236 lb⋅ft) at 1,800 rpm
150 Multijet^{2}	Iveco F1AE3481E	2,287 cc	DOHC 16v	Common rail direct fuel injection	148 PS (109 kW; 146 hp) at 3,600 rpm	350 N⋅m (258 lb⋅ft) at 1,500 rpm
180 Multijet Power/3.0 HDi/EcoDiesel	Iveco F1CE3481E	2,999 cc	DOHC 16v	Common rail direct fuel injection	177 PS (130 kW; 175 hp) at 3,500 rpm	400 N⋅m (295 lb⋅ft) at 1,400 rpm
CNG engines
140 Natural Power	Iveco F1C	2,999 cc	DOHC 16v	MPI Indirect injection	136 PS (100 kW; 134 hp) at 2,700 rpm	350 N⋅m (258 lb⋅ft) at 1,500 rpm
Petrol engines
3.6 Pentastar^{3}	Chrysler Pentastar	3,604 cc	DOHC 24v VVT	Sequential Multiple-Port Fuel Injection	284 PS (209 kW; 280 hp) at 6,400 rpm	353 N⋅m (260 lb⋅ft) at 4,400 rpm

^{1} Only for Citroën Jumper and Peugeot Boxer
^{2} Only for Fiat Ducato
^{3} Only for Ram ProMaster

Note: for some versions/markets, the previous engines are still available.

Key Ducato (3rd generation) dimensions
Length Height				C / L1		M / L2	L / L3	XL / L4
Length Height				Exterior	4,963 mm (195.4 in)	5,413 mm (213.1 in)	5,998 mm (236.1 in)	6,363 mm (250.5 in)
Length Height				WB	3,000 mm (118.1 in)	3,450 mm (135.8 in)	4,035 mm (158.9 in)	
Length Height				Interior	2,670 mm (105.1 in)	3,120 mm (122.8 in)	3,705 mm (145.9 in)	4,070 mm (160.2 in)
H1	Exterior	Interior	Volume	8 m^{3} (280 ft^{3})		10 m^{3} (350 ft^{3})	N/A	
H1	2,254 mm (88.7 in)	1,662 mm (65.4 in)	Volume	8 m^{3} (280 ft^{3})		10 m^{3} (350 ft^{3})	N/A	
H2	2,522 mm (99.3 in)	1,932 mm (76.1 in)	Volume	9.5 m^{3} (340 ft^{3})		11.5 m^{3} (410 ft^{3})	13 m^{3} (460 ft^{3})	15 m^{3} (530 ft^{3})
H3	2,764 mm (108.8 in)	2,172 mm (85.5 in)	Volume	N/A			15 m^{3} (530 ft^{3})	17 m^{3} (600 ft^{3})

Notes

- Interior width is 1,870 mm (73.6 in) for all versions, 1,422 mm (56.0 in) between the internal wheel arches.

=== First facelift (2014) ===
The fourth-generation Ducato/Jumper/Relay/Boxer (platform designation X290) was introduced in the summer of 2014, scheduled for an October 2014 debut as a 2015 model (except in Australia which had two models for Relay/Dispatch: a 2017 model with first facelift and a 2019 model with second facelift) while the 2014 model year was entirely skipped. Although based on the third generation model, it features a heavily revised front end, with more car like headlight styling. Euro 6 engines were introduced for the 2017 model year in late 2016, and does not require AdBlue (Fiat version only) unlike most of its competitors. The Relay/Boxer/Jumper received the 2.0L PSA DW10 based Euro 6 engine. The Ram ProMaster was revised in 2018 for the 2019 model year with a different grille, increased payload and improved towing capacity.

In 2019, Ducato moved from the twin EGR system introduced for the Euro 6 to AdBlue on the 2.3L engine to comply with Euro 6d. In the same year, the Boxer/Relay/Jumper changed from the 2.0L PSA DW10 engine to the 2.2L DW12 based engine.

In 2021, new features include adaptive cruise control, autonomous emergency braking and lane keep assist. In the same year, following the acquisition of Opel and Vauxhall by Groupe PSA and its subsequent merger with FCA to form Stellantis, the Ducato was rebadged as the Opel/Vauxhall Movano, which was previously based on the Renault Master.

In 2022, the Ducato and ProMaster received a redesigned dashboard and the 948TE nine-speed automatic transmission as standard equipment for the ProMaster and optional for the Ducato. The Ducato also received the 2.2L Fiat Pratola Serra Family B turbo diesel, branded as the Multijet 3 (from the end of 2021), while the ProMaster received a revised 3.6L Pentastar. For the 2023 model year, the front end of the ProMaster was redesigned to match its European counterparts, coinciding with the introduction of the ProMaster EV; the van also received a third "super-high" roof option on the longest wheelbase. Also in 2023 Ducato in Europe and other markets switched engines again, this time to the PSA DW12 2.2L unit PSA EW/DW engine used in the other Sevel vans (Relay/Boxer/Jumper/Movano).

From 2024, they started using the 2184 cc, Euro 6e Fiat Pratola Serra engine in all variants sold on the European market (Ducato, Jumper, Boxer, Movano and ProAce Max). This was initially available in three different power outputs: 120, 140, and 180 PS (88, 103, and 132 kW).

Toyota Motor Europe and Stellantis plan to build a Toyota-badged large van based on the Ducato platform, and is expected to be released in mid-2024. This is an expansion of the two automakers' LCV partnership started in 2012.

=== Electric versions ===
==== E-Ducato (2021) ====
The battery electric Ducato Electric was announced in July 2019, with planned availability in 2020. The targeted range was 220 to 360 km (140 to 220 mi) on the New European Driving Cycle. The same body variants as the conventional Ducato would be available, providing cargo volumes of 10 to 17 m^{3} (350 to 600 cu ft) and maximum payload of 1,950 kg (4,300 lb).

In April 2021, Fiat launched the E-Ducato, which had been co-developed with package delivery firm DHL. Ducato gliders are assembled at the Fiat Sevel Sud factory in Atessa, then shipped to Fiat Mirafiori in Turin, where they are fitted with a drivetrain developed by SolarEdge. Estimated maximum production capacity is 1,000 vehicles per month. The similar electric van variants sold by PSA as the Citroën Jumper/Relay and Peugeot Boxer also are assembled at Sevel Sud, but use a different battery technology as they are converted by BD Auto instead.

The 2021 E-Ducato is fitted with either a 3- or 5-module high voltage traction battery with 47 or 79 kW-hr of storage, respectively; estimated range is 280 km (170 mi) under the WLTP mixed cycle for the larger battery. Traction motor peak output is 90 kW (120 hp) and 280 N⋅m (210 lbf⋅ft). As an option, the E-Ducato can be fitted with a port to accept power at up to 50 kW (DC).

In comparison, the e-Boxer conversion uses a traction battery with 37 or 75 kW-hr of storage, giving an estimated range of 73 or 154 mi (117 or 248 km), respectively (WLTP).

==== E-Ducato and Ram ProMaster EV (2024) ====
For the 2024 model year (coinciding with a facelift), the E-Ducato received a new drivetrain. The battery has a capacity of 110 kWh, providing power to an electric traction motor with a peak output of 200 kW (270 hp) and 410 N⋅m (300 lbf⋅ft). The Ducato's siblings from other Stellantis brands, the Peugeot e-Boxer, the Citroën e-Jumper (Citroën e-Relay in the UK & Ireland), the Opel/Vauxhall Movano-e, and the new Toyota Proace Max Electric, also received this new drivetrain.

In January 2024 for the North American market, Stellantis unveiled the Ram ProMaster EV, also equipped with an identical drivetrain featuring a 110 kWh battery and a 268 hp (200 kW), 302 lb⋅ft (409 N⋅m) motor. The targeted range is 174 mi (280 km) in city driving; maximum charging rate is 150 kW using a Level 3 (DC) fast charger. Orders for the Ram ProMaster EV (delivery model) were opened in September 2024; the cargo model will follow in 2025.

==== Iveco eSuperJolly (2025) ====
In June 2025, Iveco unveiled the eSuperJolly alongside the smaller eJolly, slotting under the Daily and above the eMoovy as Iveco's midsize electric van offering.

=== Hydrogen versions ===
==== E-Ducato Hydrogen (2025) ====
On November 22, 2023, as the lead partner in Stellantis for the development of hydrogen products, Opel announced the Movano HYDROGEN would come to market along with its siblings the Citroën e-Jumper Hydrogen, Peugeot e-Boxer Hydrogen, and Fiat E-Ducato Hydrogen.

Components for the large hydrogen van are shared with the mid-sized Opel Vivaro-e Hydrogen van, using a 110 kW motor, 45 kW fuel cell and 10.5kWh lithium-ion battery combined with four, rather than three, hydrogen cylinders. The H2 Ducato will have an expected range of more than 500 km. Sales will begin in Europe in 2025. North America will get an H2 pick-up truck in addition to the van, under the Ram brand.

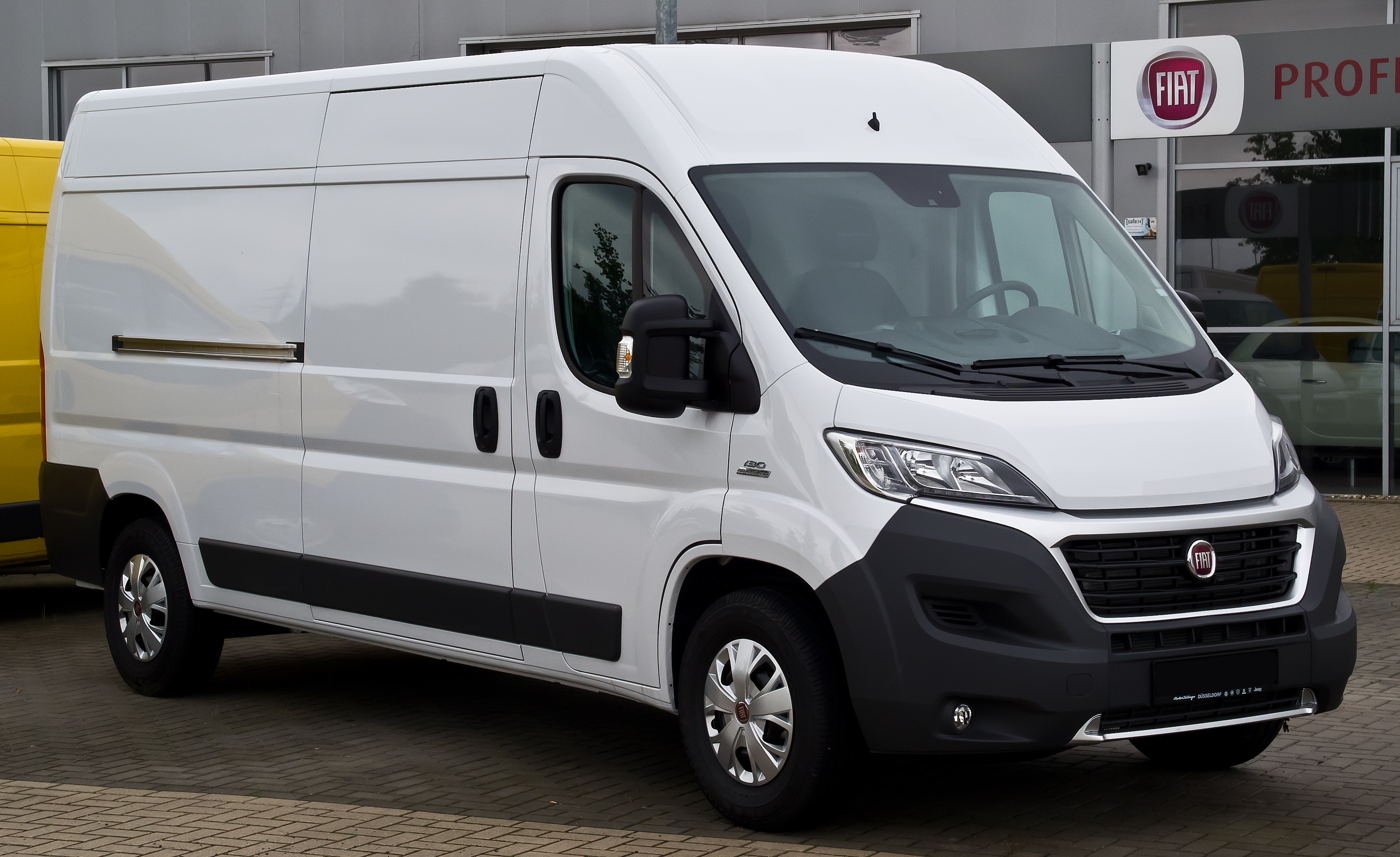
Fiat Ducato (2014 facelift, old badge)

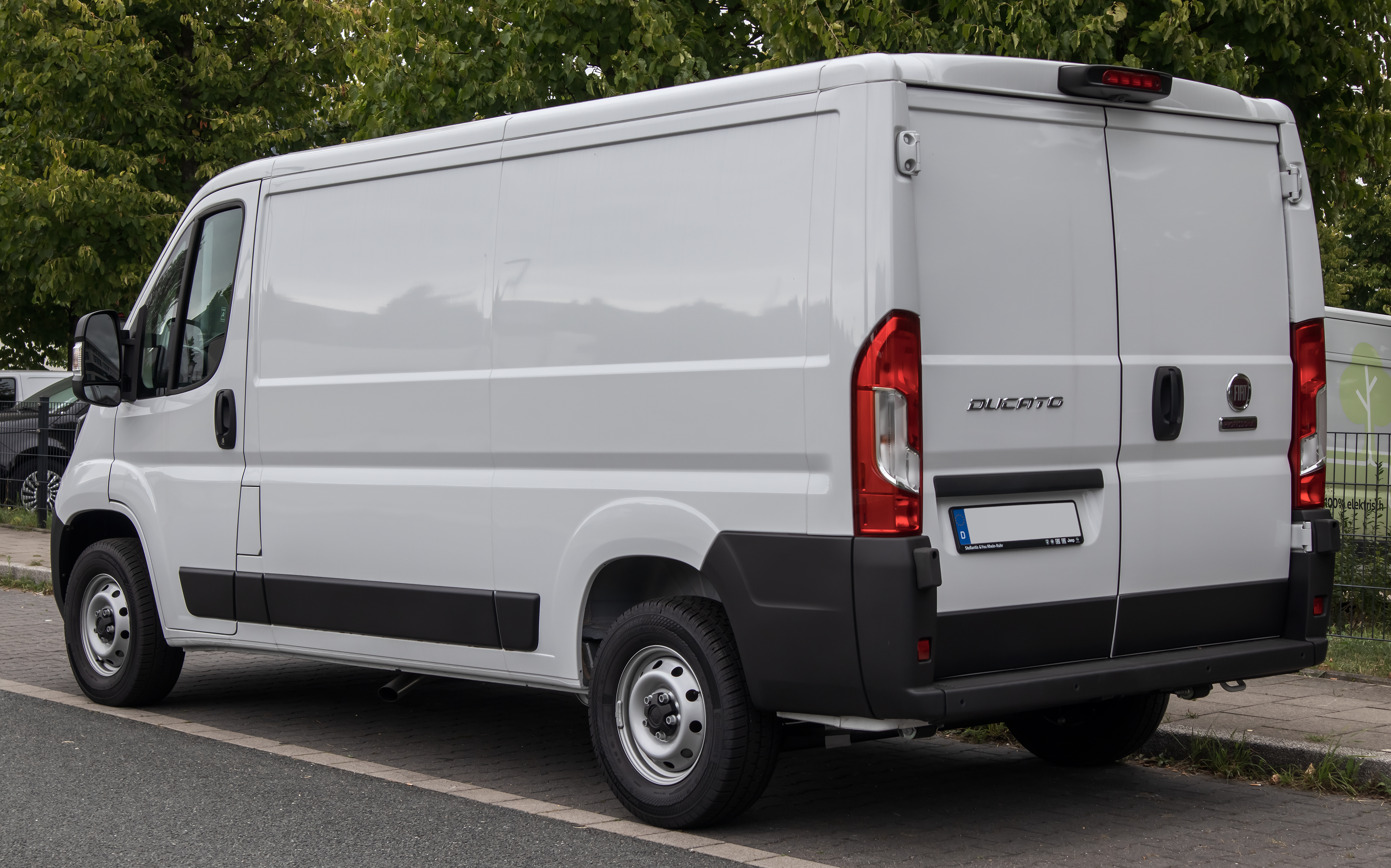
Rear view (2014 facelift)

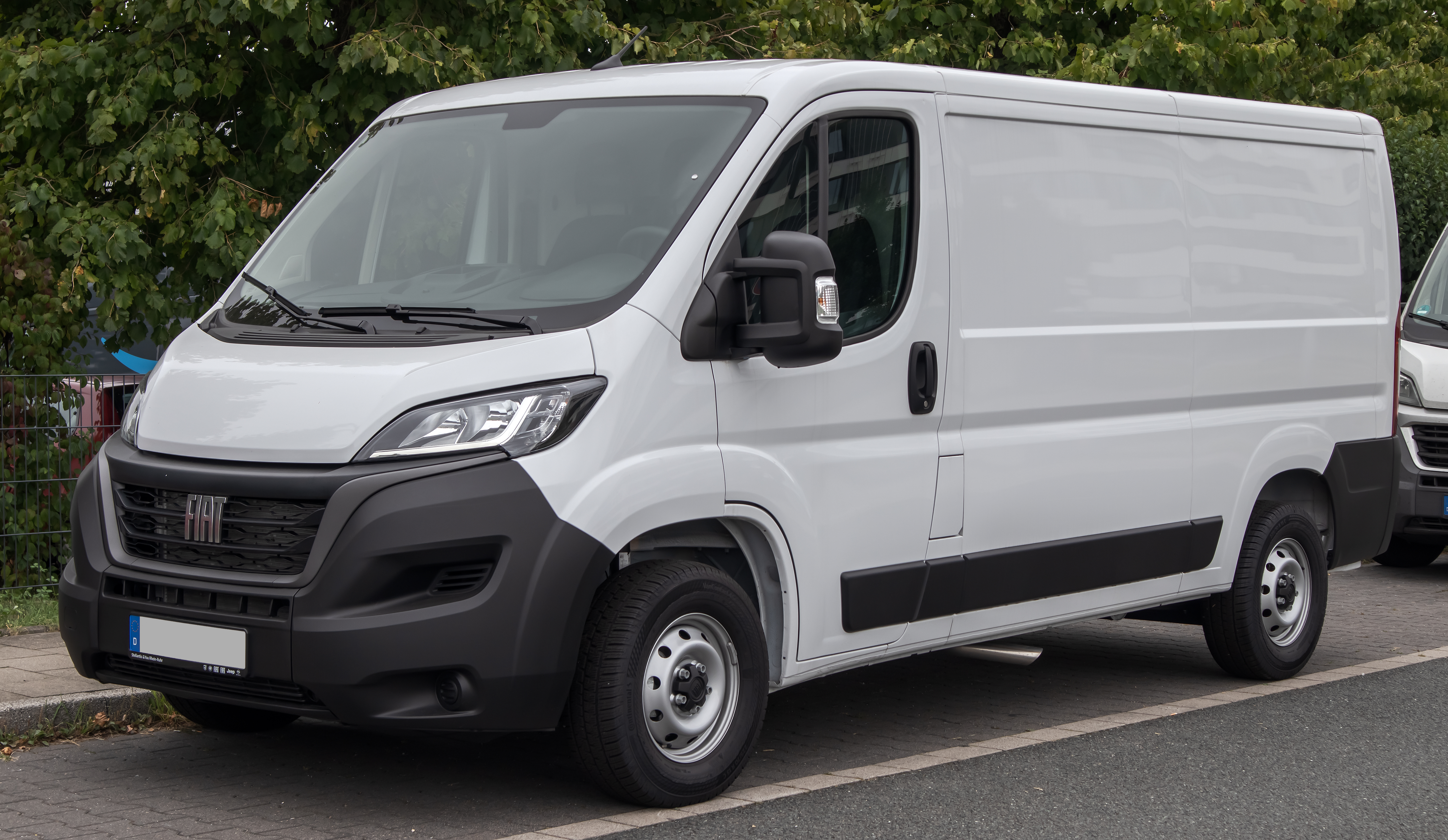
2024 facelift with new logo

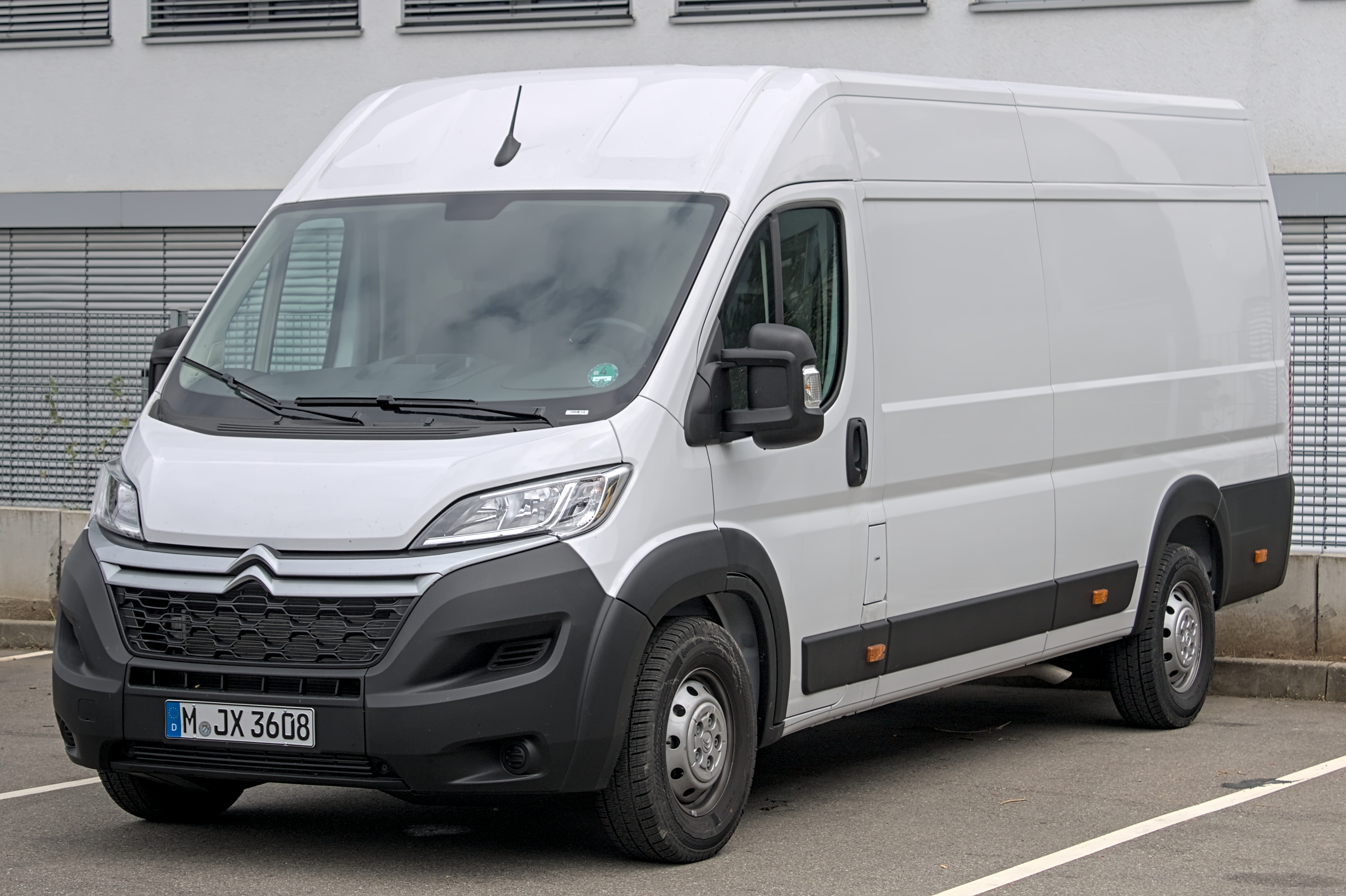
Citroën Jumper (2014 facelift)

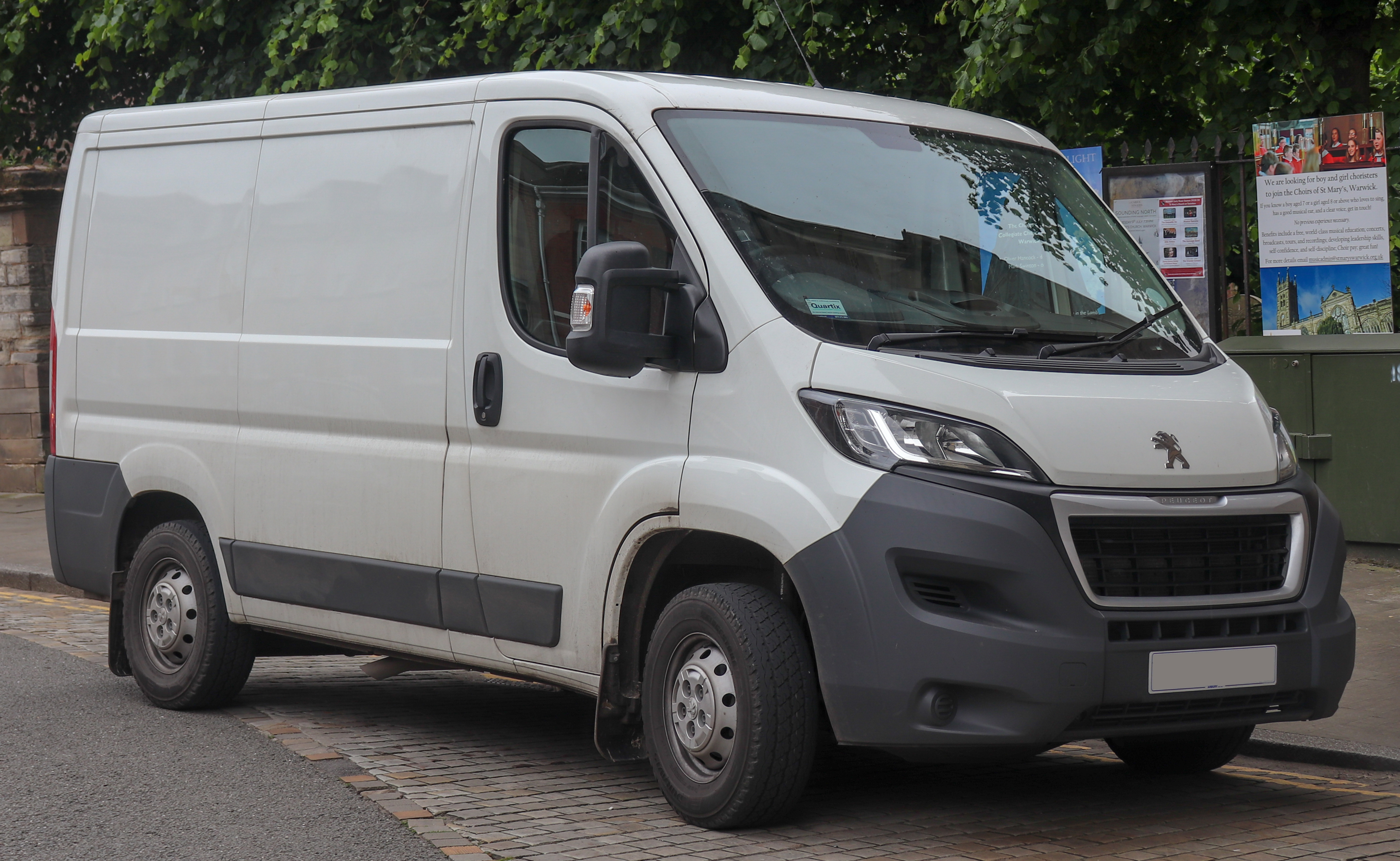
Peugeot Boxer (2014 facelift)

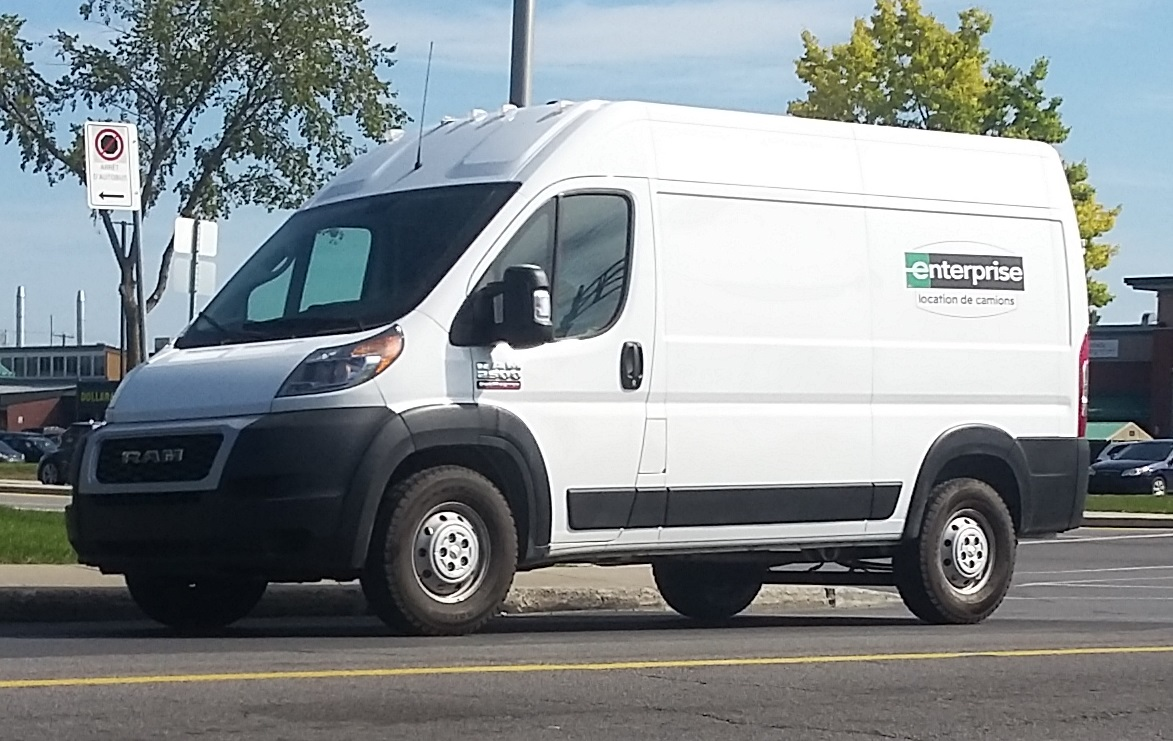
Ram ProMaster (2019 facelift)

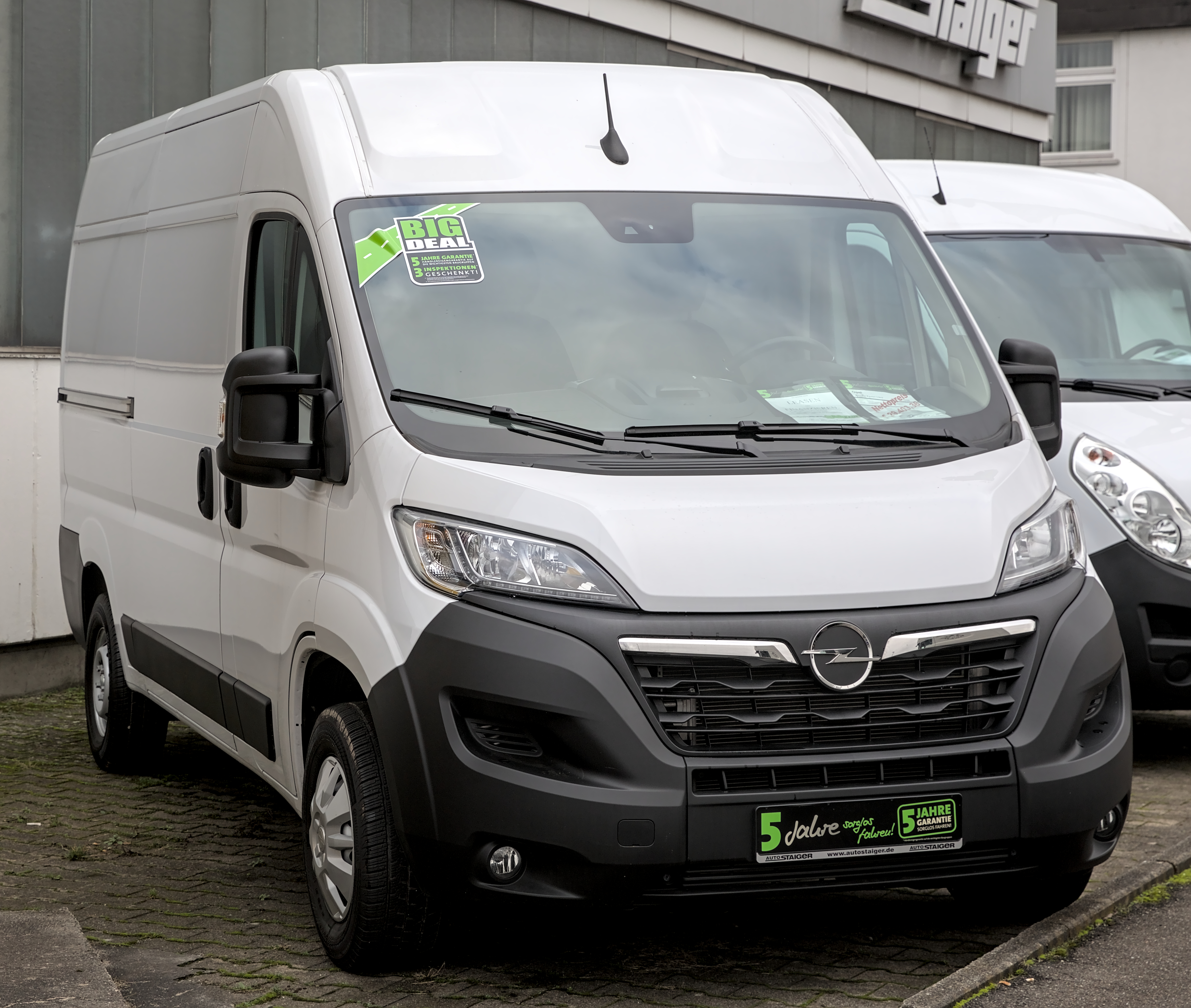
Opel Movano

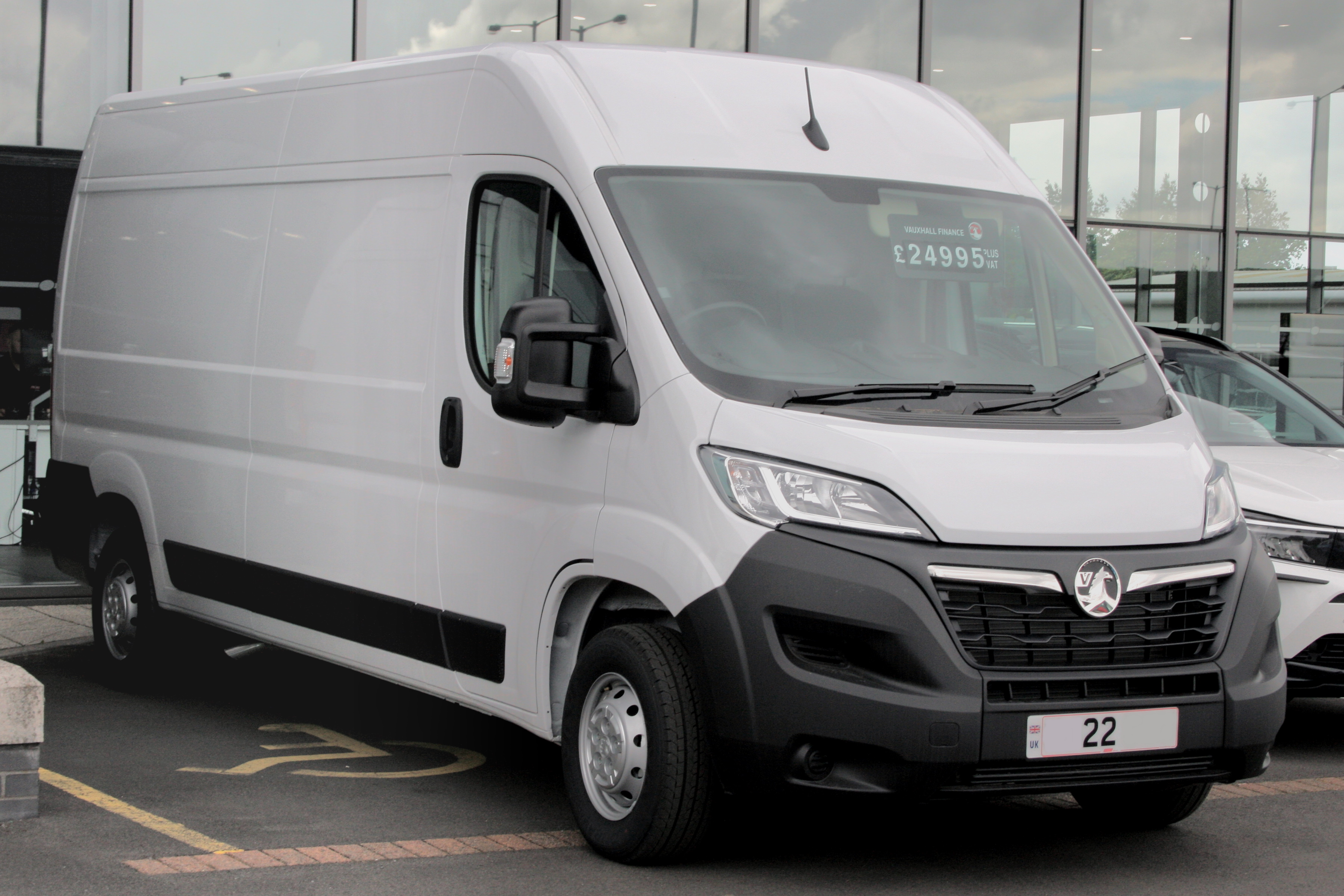
Vauxhall Movano

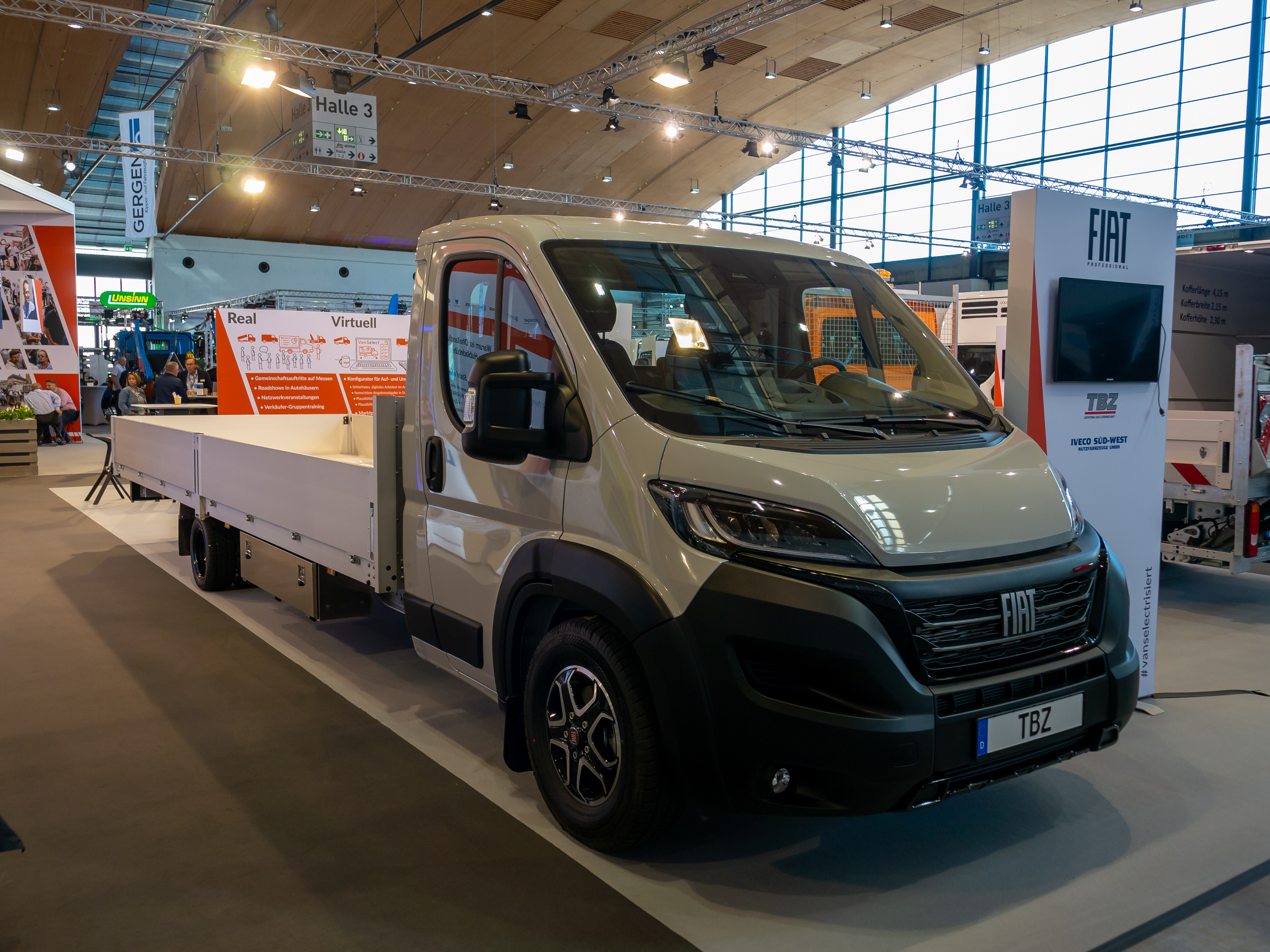
Fiat Ducato Flatbed

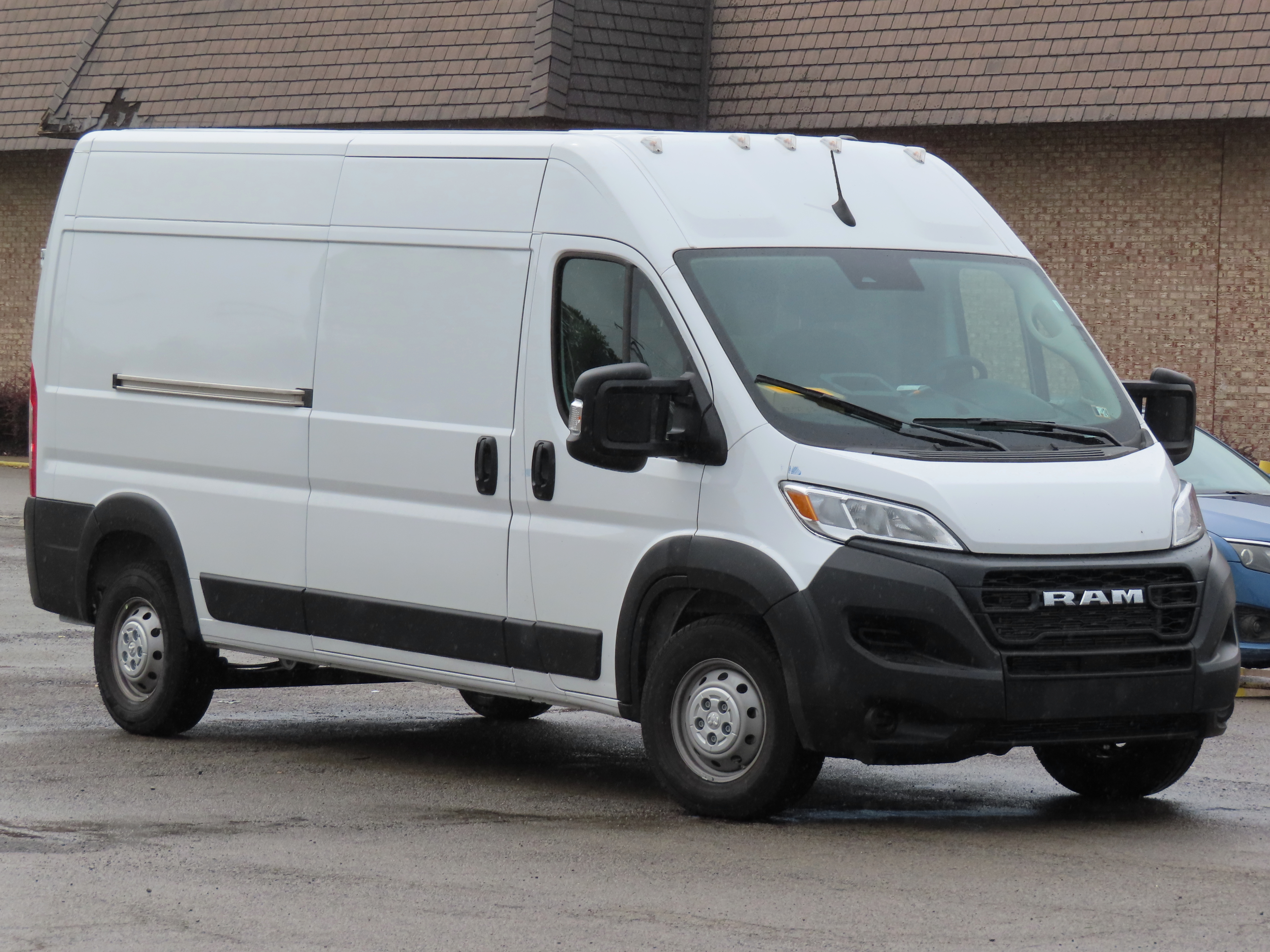
Ram ProMaster (2023 facelift)

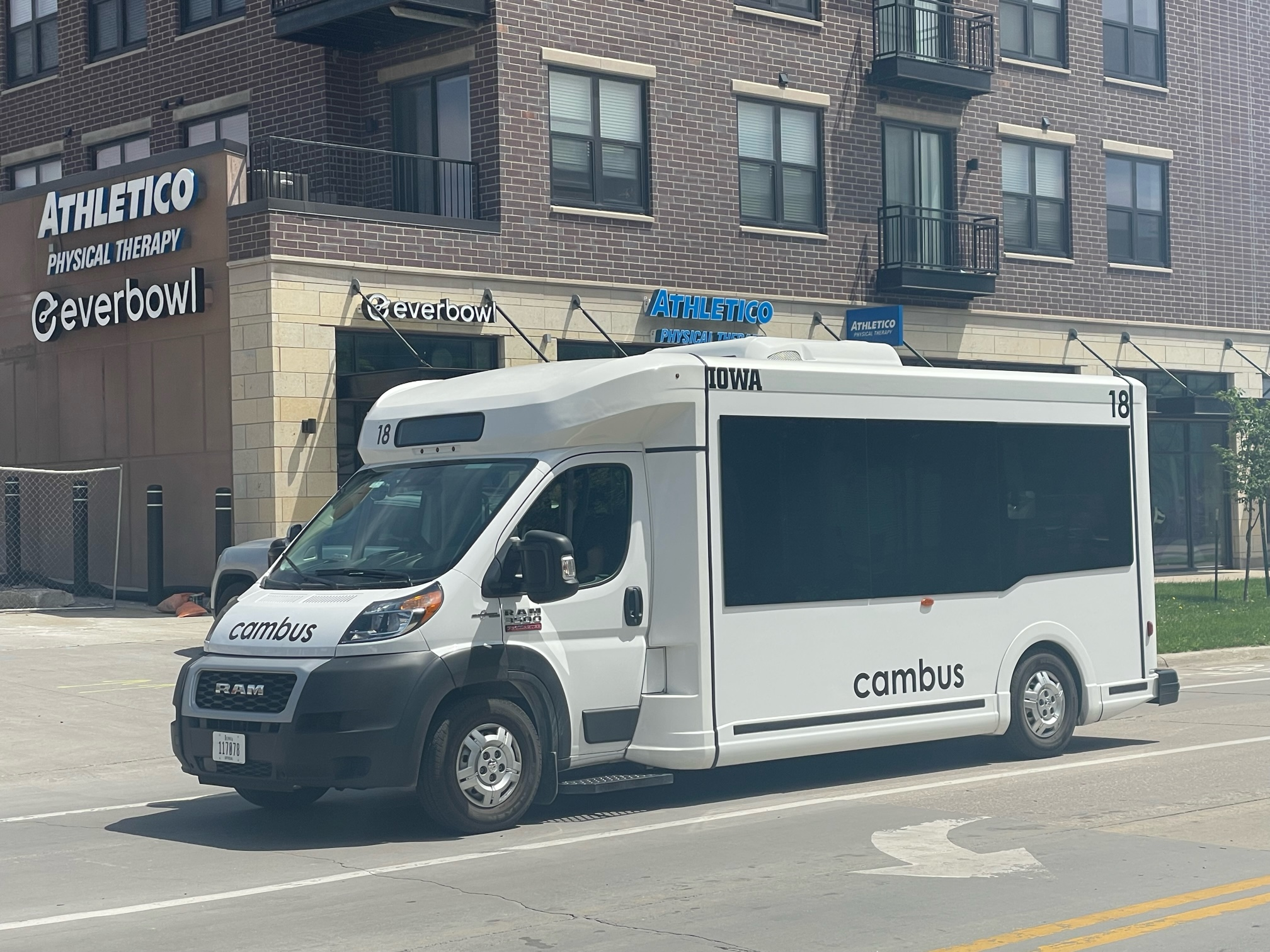

=== Second facelift (2024) ===
A second facelift was revealed on October 23, 2023, introducing technological updates. The engine, for all versions, is either the 2.2 B22 Multijet or a fully electric powertrain. In North America, the Ram ProMaster is sold with a 3.6 L gasoline engine or a fully electric powertrain.

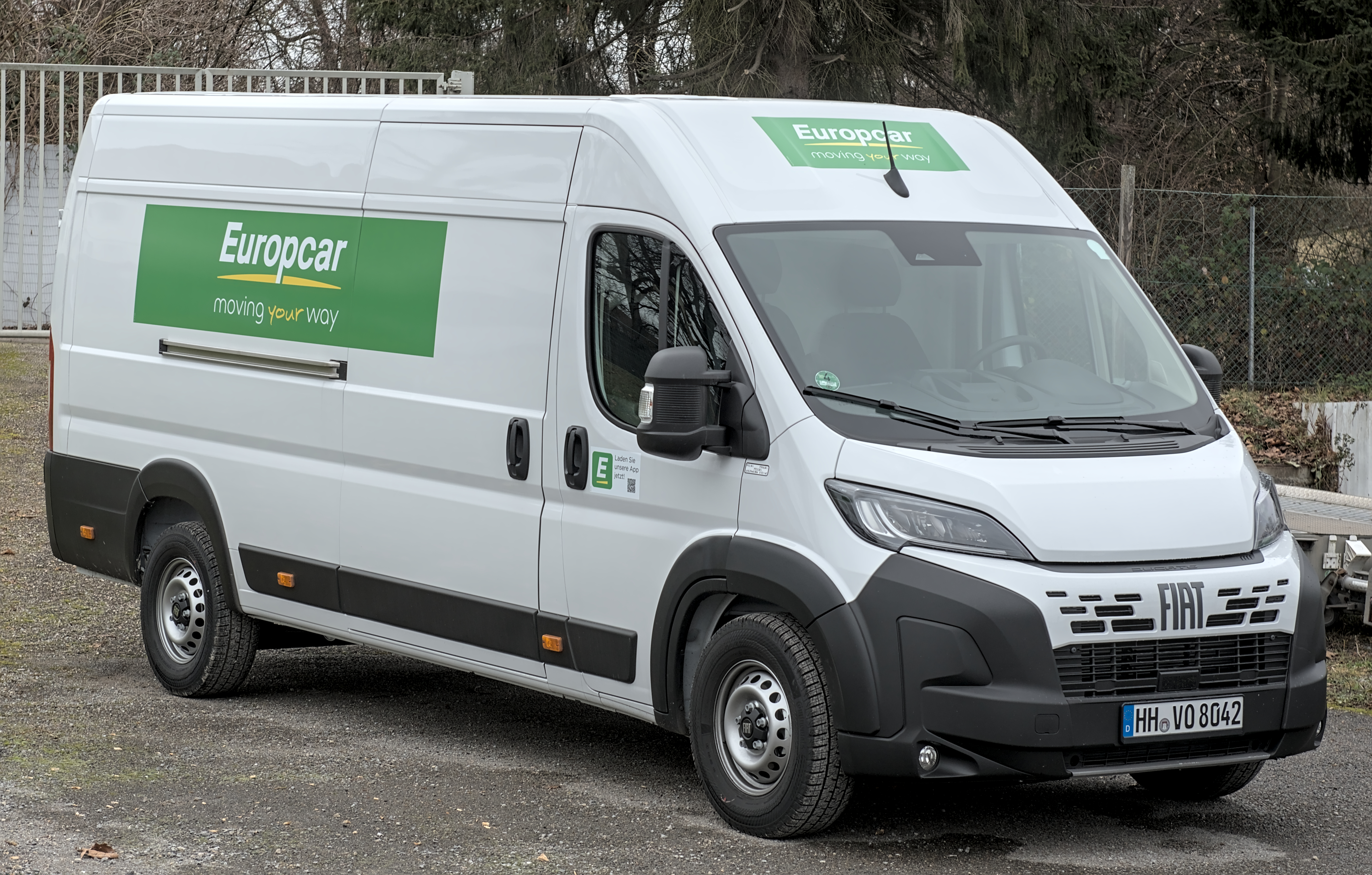
Fiat Ducato (2024 facelift)

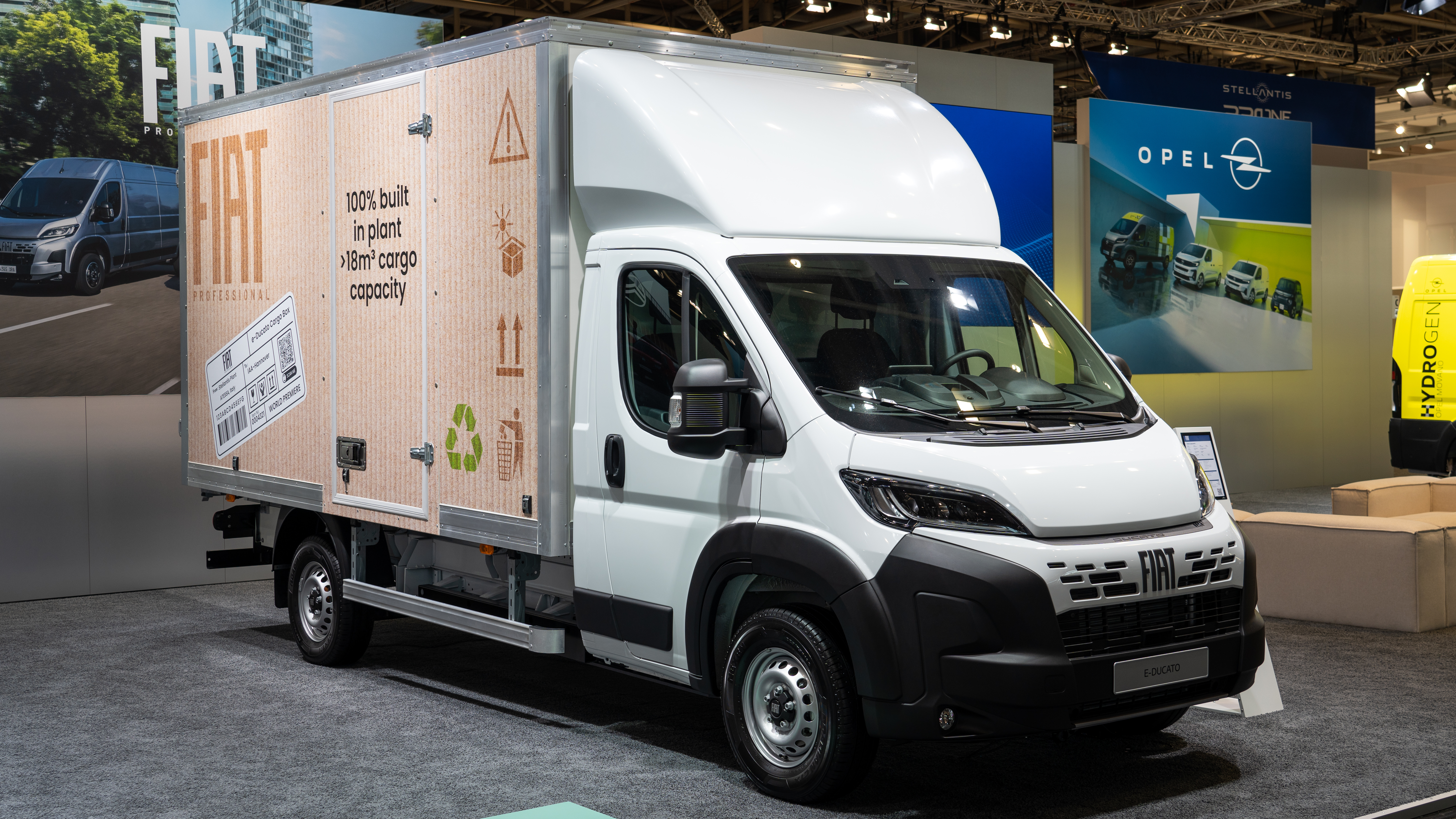
Fiat E-Ducato (2024 facelift)

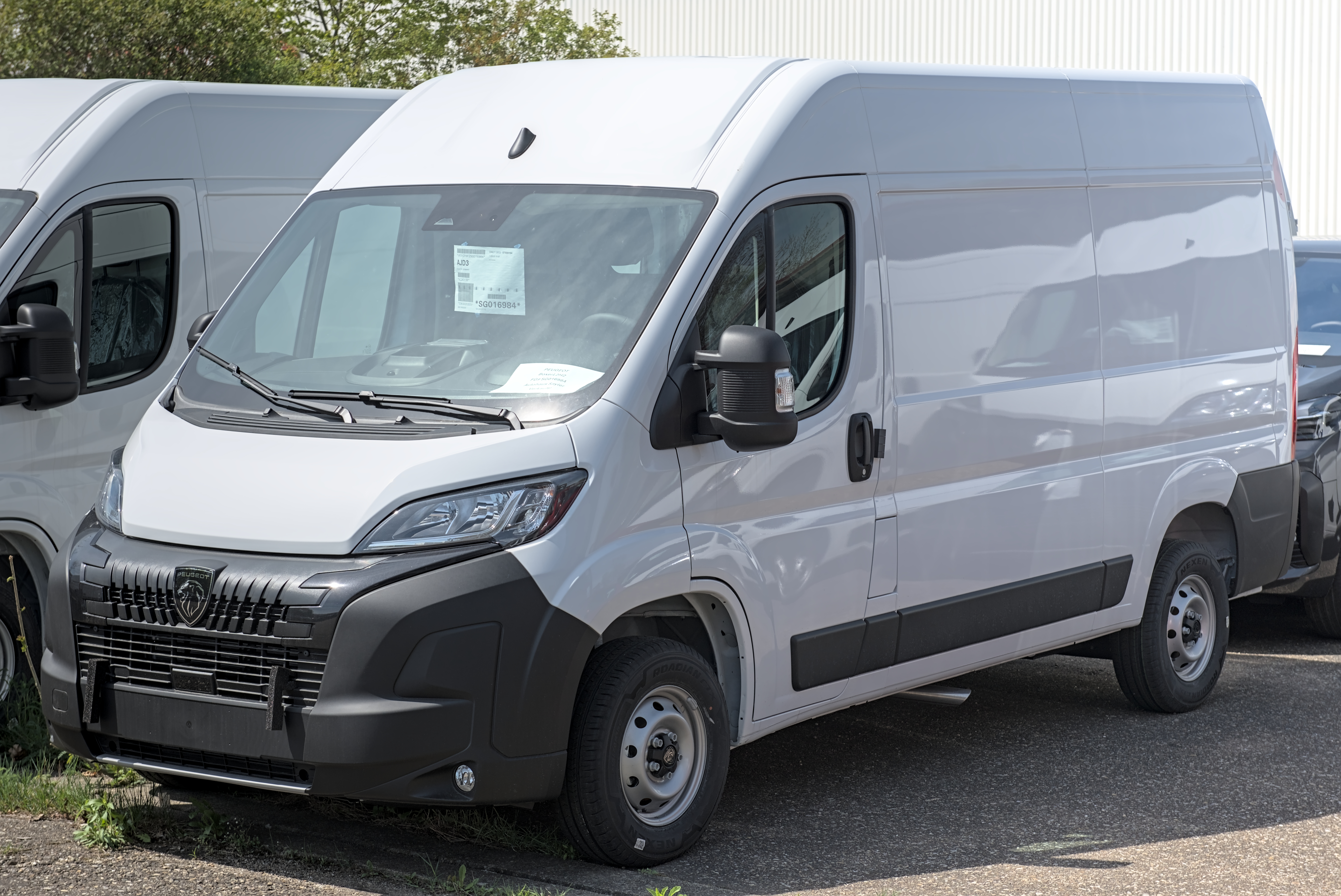
Peugeot Boxer (2024 facelift)

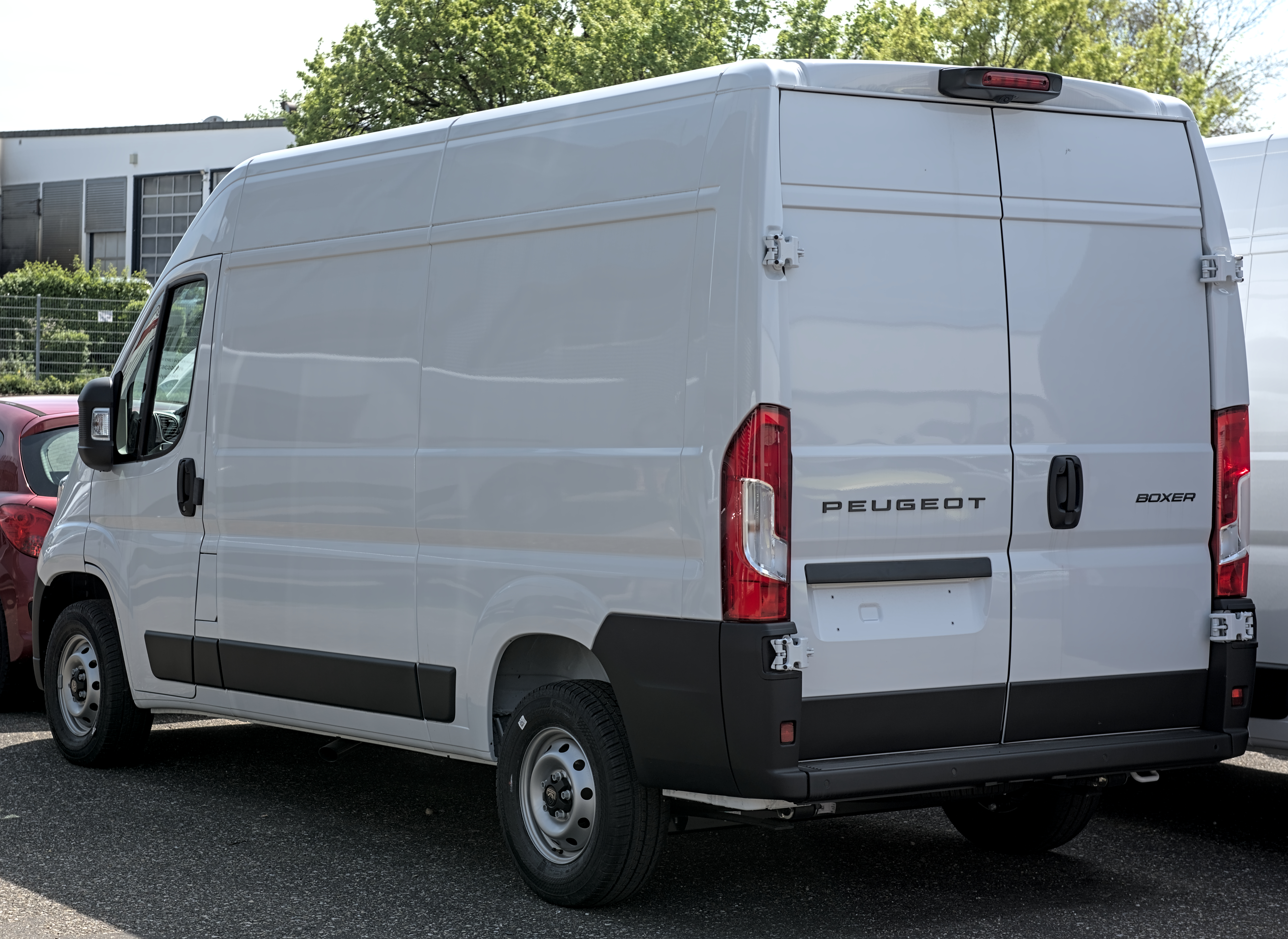
Peugeot Boxer (2024 Facelift)

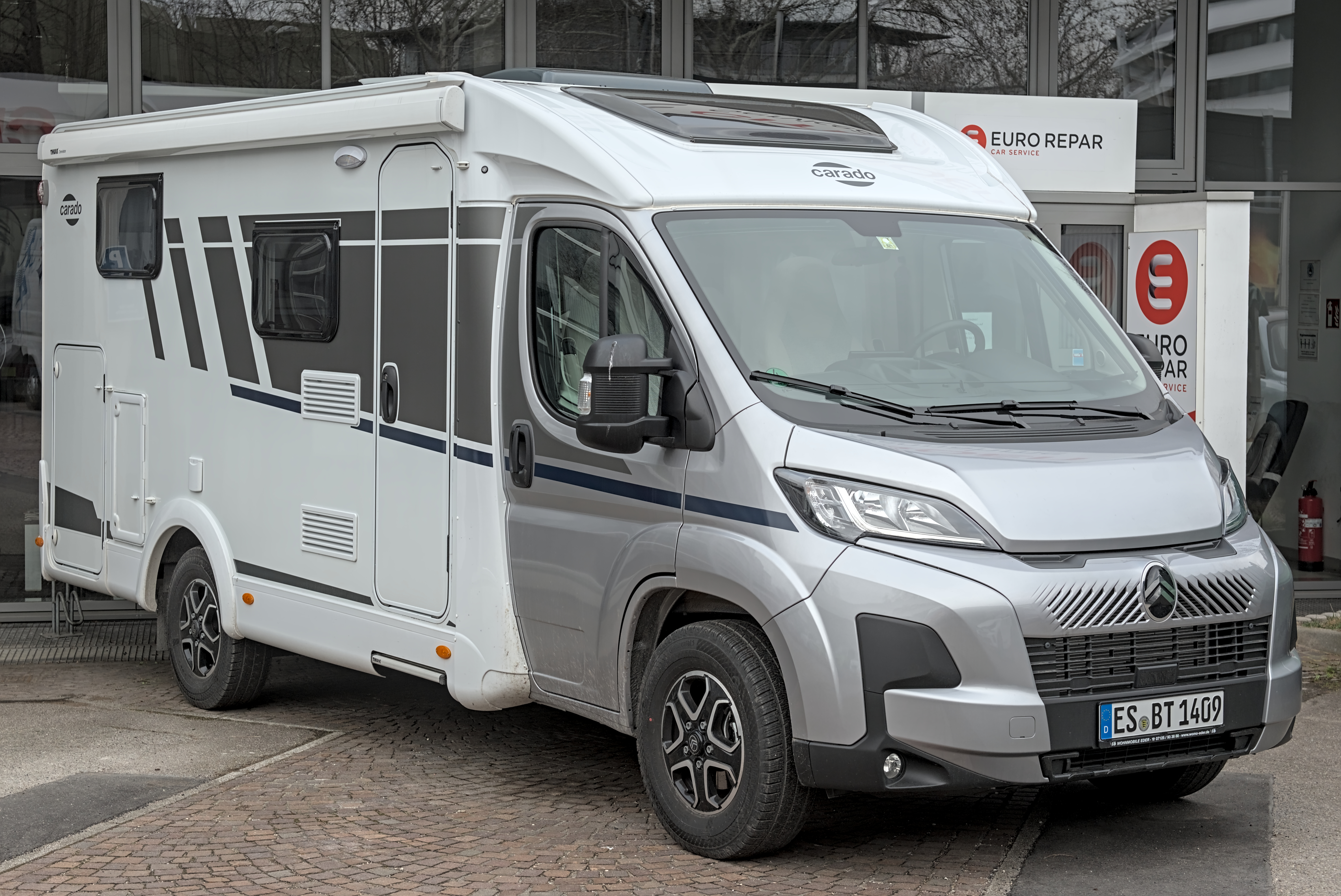
Citroën Jumper Camper

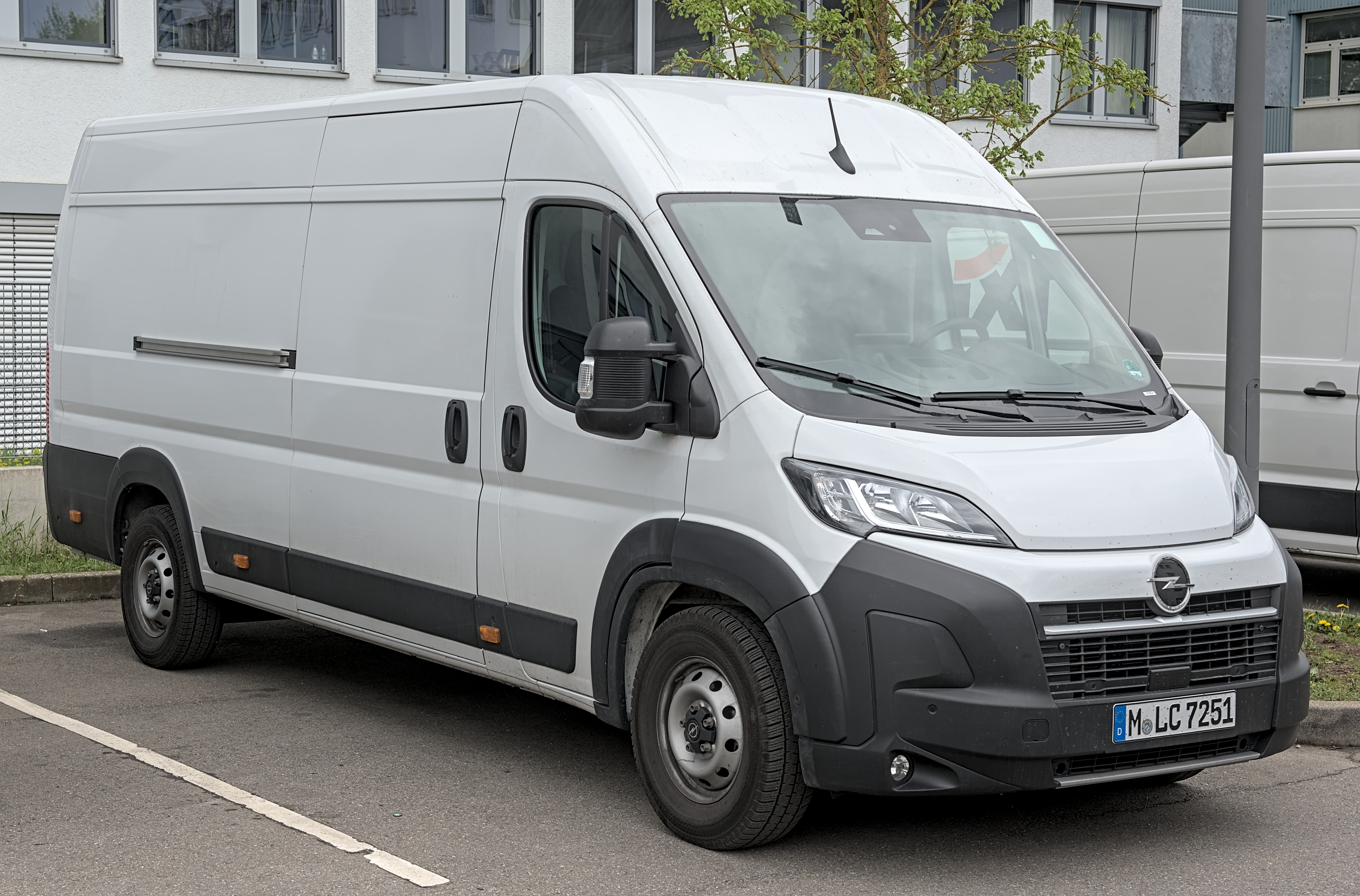
Opel Movano C (2024 facelift)

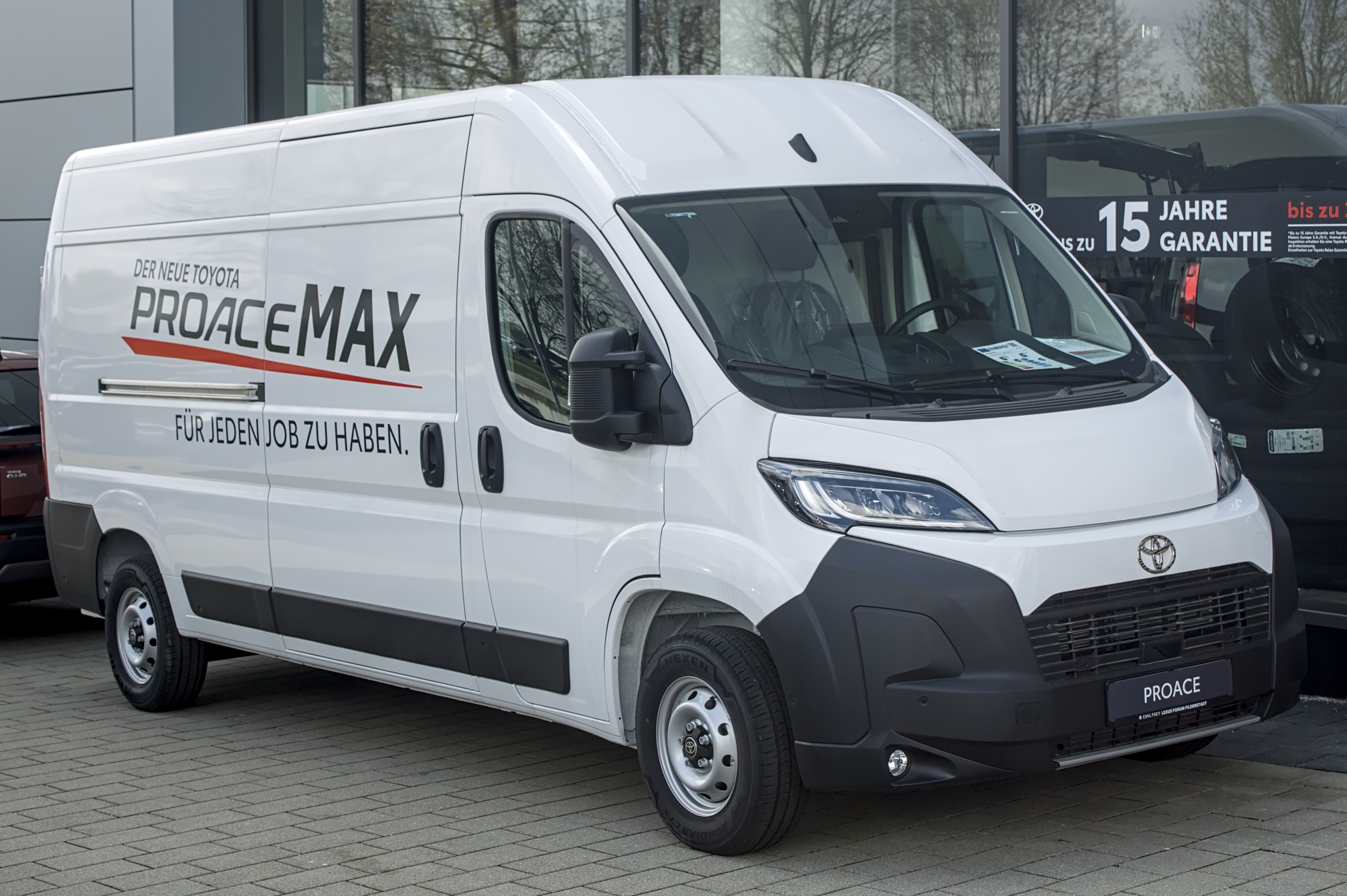
Toyota Proace Max

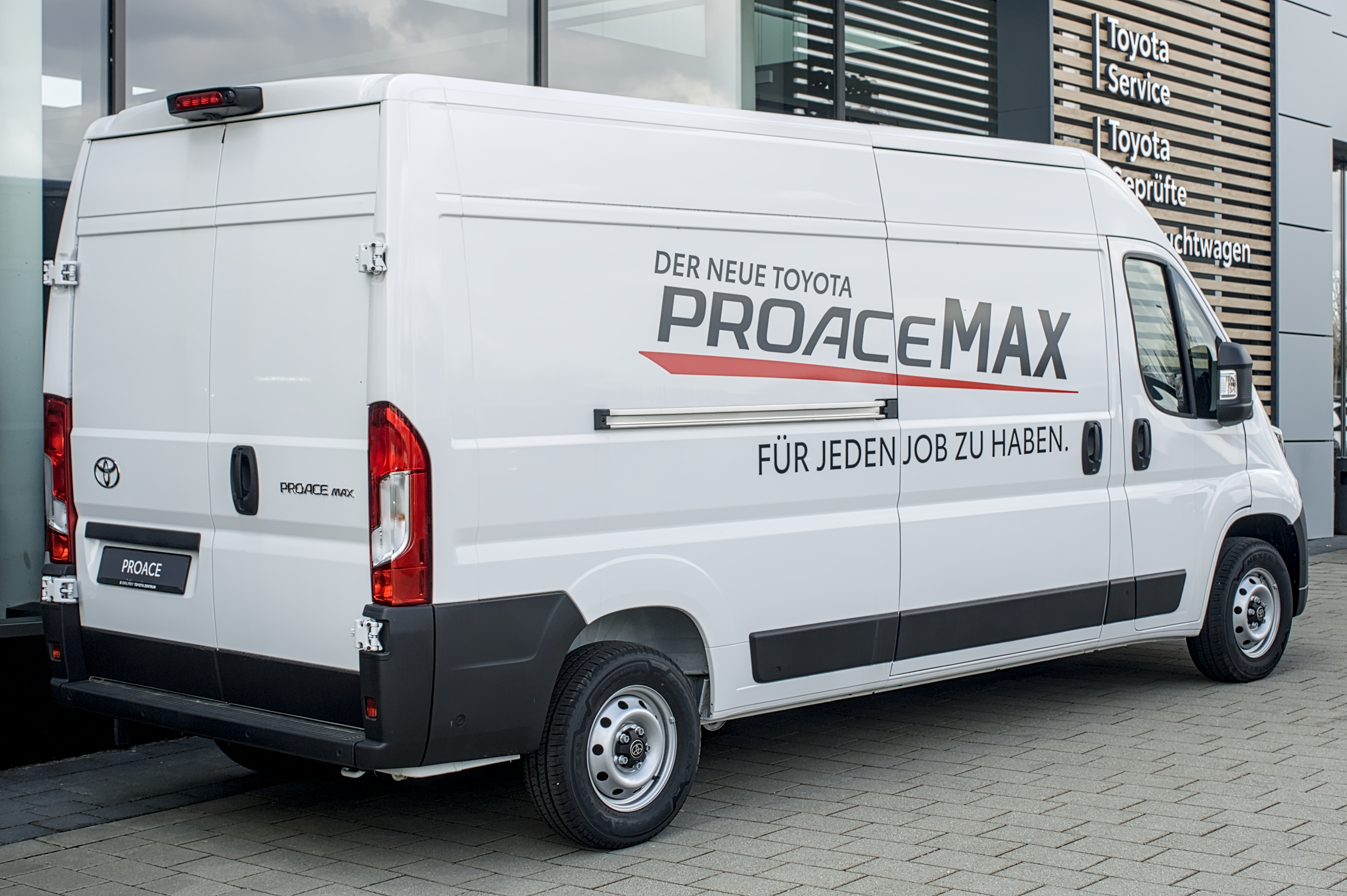
Toyota Proace Max

=== Safety ===
==== ANCAP ====
ANCAP test results Peugeot Boxer (2020)
Overall
Grading:	33% (Bronze)

ANCAP test results Peugeot Boxer (2024)
Overall
Grading:	77% (Gold)

ANCAP test results Fiat Ducato all variants (2020)
Overall
Grading:	88% (Platinum)

ANCAP test results Fiat Ducato (2024)
Overall
Grading:	77% (Gold)

==== Euro NCAP ====
Euro NCAP test results Fiat Ducato (2025)
Test	Score
Overall:	5 /5 stars
Safe driving	78%
Crash avoidance	64%
Post crash	80%

Euro NCAP test results Citroën Jumper (2025)
Test	Score
Overall:	5 /5 stars
Safe driving	78%
Crash avoidance	64%
Post crash	80%

Euro NCAP test results Opel Movano (2025)
Test	Score
Overall:	5 /5 stars
Safe driving	78%
Crash avoidance	64%
Post crash	80%

Euro NCAP test results Peugeot Boxer (2025)
Test	Score
Overall:	5 /5 stars
Safe driving	78%
Crash avoidance	64%
Post crash	80%

Euro NCAP test results Toyota PROACE MAX (2025)
Test	Score
Overall:	5 /5 stars
Safe driving	78%
Crash avoidance	64%
Post crash	80%

=== Sales and production figures ===
Year	Worldwide production			Worldwide sales			Notes
Year	Relay	Ducato	Boxer	Relay	Ducato	Boxer	Notes
2009	TBA	TBA	25,600	TBA	TBA	31,900	
2010	TBA	TBA	50,300	TBA	TBA	48,800	
2011	47,238	TBA	58,601	46,094	TBA	57,662	Total Jumper production reached 683,112 units. Total Boxer production reached 782,012 units.
2012	43,400	TBA	54,200	43,100	TBA	53,900	Total Jumper production reached 726,500 units. Total Boxer production reached 836,200 units.

==== Ram ProMaster sales ====
Calendar year	US	Canada
2014	18,039	
2015	28,345	
2016	40,440	2,623
2017	40,483	4,320
2018	46,600	4,165
2019	56,409	4,483
2020	50,556	3,518
2021	63,361	3,008
2022	60,936	5,137
2023	81,663	3,866
2024	65,869	5,586
2025	57,591	5,247
