= 132 =

132 may refer to:

- 132 (number), the natural number following 131 and preceding 133
- AD 132, a leap year starting on Monday of the Julian calendar
- 132 BC, a year of the pre-Julian Roman calendar
- Route 132 (MBTA), a bus route in Massachusetts, US
- 132 Aethra, a Mars-crossing asteroid
- Fiat 132, a sedan
  - SEAT 132, a sedan that used the Fiat 132 body
