= Fiat Twin Cam engine =

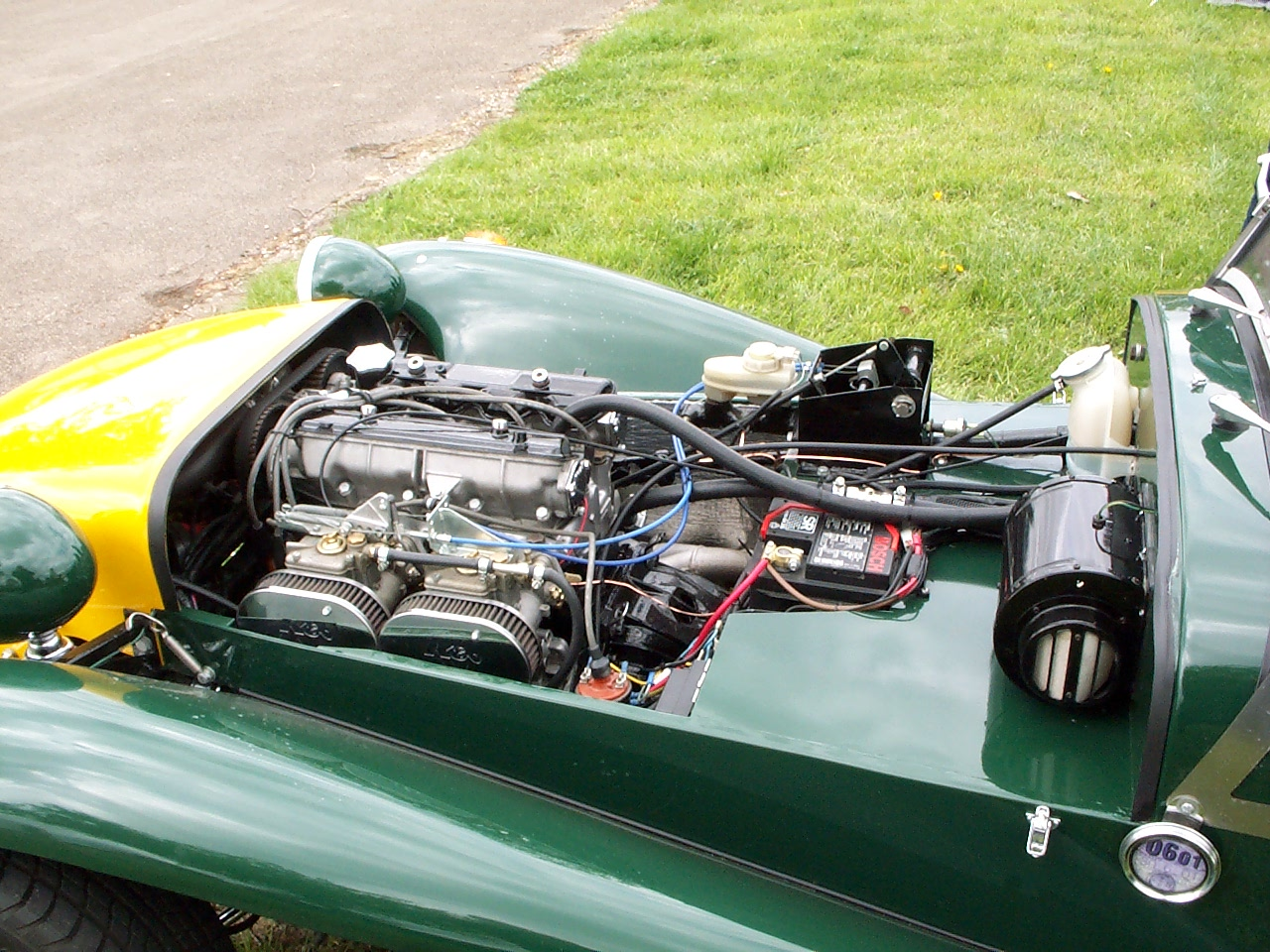

Overview
- Manufacturer: Fiat/Lancia
- Production: 1966–2000

Layout
- Configuration: I4
- Displacement: 1.3–2.1 L (1,297–2,111 cc)
- Cylinder bore: 76 mm (2.99 in); 76.1 mm (3.00 in); 78 mm (3.07 in); 80 mm (3.15 in); 82.6 mm (3.25 in); 83 mm (3.27 in); 84 mm (3.31 in); 85 mm (3.35 in)
- Piston stroke: 71.5 mm (2.81 in); 79.2 mm (3.12 in); 80 mm (3.15 in); 90 mm (3.54 in); 93 mm (3.66 in)
- Cylinder block material: Cast iron
- Cylinder head material: Aluminium alloy
- Valvetrain: DOHC 2 or 4 valves x cyl.

Combustion
- Supercharger: In VX versions
- Turbocharger: In some versions
- Fuel system: Carburetor, Indirect injection, Direct injection
- Fuel type: Gasoline, Diesel
- Cooling system: Water-cooled

Chronology
- Successor: Fiat Pratola Serra engine

The Fiat Twin Cam (also known as the Lampredi Twin Cam) is an advanced double overhead camshaft inline-four automobile engine produced from 1966 through 2000 as a Fiat/Lancia engine. Designed by ex Ferrari engineer Aurelio Lampredi, the engine was produced in a large number of displacements, ranging from 1.3 to 2.1 L (1,297 to 2,111 cc) and was used in Fiat, Lancia, Alfa Romeo, SEAT, FSO and Morgan cars. The Fiat Twin Cam engine has been widely used in motorsport and has been the most successful engine in the history of the World Rally Championship. Fiat and Lancia won a total of ten World Rally Championships for Manufacturers using engines based on the Lampredi Twin Cam engine. It was replaced by the Fiat "family B" Pratola Serra engine series.

== Design ==
The Twin Cam uses the block of the overhead valve 124-series engine first found in the Fiat 124 with some modifications to accept the belt drive for the double overhead camshafts (DOHC). The head itself is made in three pieces, one carrying the combustion chamber and valves and one separate casting for each camshaft in tunnel type bearings. The valves had an included angle of 65 degrees. The engine featured a revolutionary new method for adjusting the valve clearance. Usually at that time in double overhead camshaft engines like from Alfa Romeo or Jaguar, small shims were placed on the valve stem inside the bucket tappets, thereby necessitating the removal of the camshafts to get access to these shims to adjust the valve clearance, making for time consuming and very expensive maintenance work. Lampredi’s design placed the shims on top of the tappets where they could be removed with the camshaft in situ after the tappets were pressed down with a special tool. This design was patented for Fiat and was used in the engines of the 128 and 130, and even the Ferrari/Fiat Dino V6 engine was converted to this system.

Fiat was a pioneer in engine development during the time period, using toothed rubber belt driven camshafts and aluminium alloy heads. Earlier Fiat Twin Cam engines were actually O.S.C.A. designs.

=== CHT ===
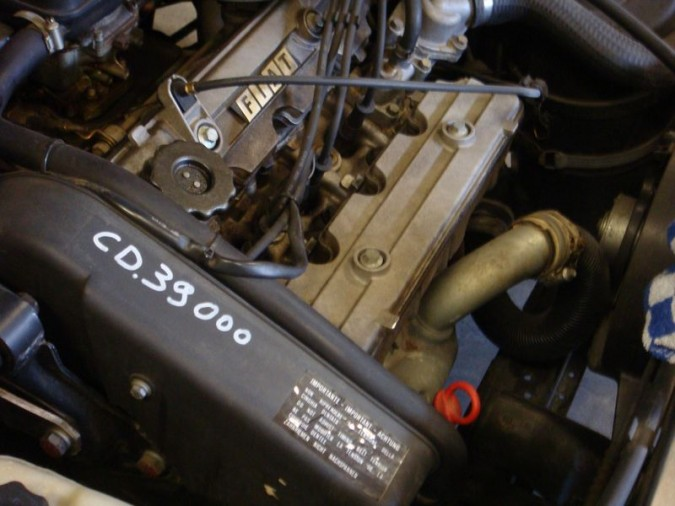
CHT engine in a Fiat Croma

One version was the CHT (for "Controlled High Turbulence"), a system developed by Yamaha. This version was mainly used in the first generation Fiat Croma and used a special head and intake with auxiliary intake ducts to provide a better fuel and gas mixture under low or partial acceleration. This meant considerably improved fuel mileage. With the Lampredi CHT engine, the Fiat Croma was one of the very first cars in volume serial production with variable intake ducts.

== Applications ==
Lampredi's twin cam engine was first seen in the Fiat 124 coupé of late 1966, but was later made available in a large number of cars.

=== Fiat ===
- 1966–1974 124 Sport coupé
- 1966–1985 124 Sport Spider
- 1970–1974 124 Special T
- 1972–1976 124 Abarth Rally
- 1967–1972 125
- 1972–1981 132
- 1981–1985 Argenta
- 1977–1983 131
- 1977–1980 131 Abarth
- 1982–1988 Ritmo
- 1984–1989 Ritmo 105TC, 125TC, 130TC
- 1983–1990 Regata
- 1985–1996 Croma
- 1988–1995 Tipo
- 1990–1999 Tempra
- 1994–1997 Coupé

=== Lancia ===
- 1972–1984 Beta
- 1973–1984 Beta Coupé/HPE/Spider
- 1975–1982 Beta Montecarlo
- 1976–1977 Beta Scorpion
- 1982–1983 Rally 037
- 1980–1984 Trevi
- 1983–1993 Delta (Mk1)
- 1988–1993 Delta Integrale
- 1982–1989 Prisma
- 1984–1994 Thema
- 1989–1997 Dedra
- 1993–1999 Delta (Mk2)
- 1994–1998 Kappa
- 1997–1998 Kappa Coupé

=== SEAT ===
- 1969–1975 1430 Especial
- 1971–1975 124 Sport Coupe
- 1973–1982 132
- 1975–1984 131
- 1975–1980 124D
- 1979–1983 SEAT Ritmo
- 1982–1986 SEAT Ronda
- 1984–1991 SEAT Malaga LD/GLD
- 1984–1993 Seat Ibiza Diesel

=== Alfa Romeo ===
- 1988–1991 164 2.0 Turbo 8V
- 1992–1997 155 Q4

=== FSO ===
- 1973–1975 Polski Fiat 125p Monte Carlo
- 1973–1977 Polski Fiat 125p Akropolis
- 1978–1989 FSO Polonez

=== Morgan ===
- 1985–1988 Morgan Plus 4

== Displacements ==
Displacement	Bore x Stroke	Models
1.3 L (1,297 cc)	76 mm × 71.5 mm (2.99 in × 2.81 in)	Lancia Beta
1.3 L (1,301 cc)	76.1 mm × 71.5 mm (3.00 in × 2.81 in)	Lancia Beta, Fiat 131 Supermirafiori
1.4 L (1,367 cc)	78 mm × 71.5 mm (3.07 in × 2.81 in)	Fiat 131 Supermirafiori
1.4 L (1,438 cc)	80 mm × 71.5 mm (3.15 in × 2.81 in)	Lancia Beta; Fiat 124 Special T/coupe/Spider;
1.6 L (1,585 cc)	84 mm × 71.5 mm (3.31 in × 2.81 in)	Fiat 131 Supermirafiori, Fiat 132/Argenta, Fiat Ritmo 105TC; Lancia Beta, Lancia Beta Coupe/HPE, Lancia Delta/Prisma
1.6 L (1,592 cc)	80 mm × 79.2 mm (3.15 in × 3.12 in)	Fiat 124 Special T/coupe/Spider, Fiat 132; Lancia Beta; SEAT 124, SEAT 1430, SEAT 131, SEAT 132, SEAT Ritmo, SEAT Ronda; Polski Fiat 125p Monte Carlo
1.6 L (1,608 cc)	80 mm × 80 mm (3.15 in × 3.15 in)	Fiat 124 coupe/Spider, Fiat 125; SEAT 124 Sport
1.7 L (1,714 cc)	83 mm × 79.2 mm (3.27 in × 3.12 in)	Fiat Ritmo D, SEAT Ritmo D, SEAT Ronda D, Fiat Regata D, SEAT Malaga LD/GLD, SEAT Ibiza Diesel
1.8 L (1,756 cc)	84 mm × 79.2 mm (3.31 in × 3.12 in)	Fiat 124 coupe/Spider, Fiat 132, Fiat Tipo/Tempra; Lancia Beta, Lancia Beta Coupe/HPE, Lancia Dedra; SEAT 124, SEAT 124 Sport, SEAT 1430, SEAT 131, SEAT 132; Polski Fiat 125p Akropolis
1.9 L (1,920 cc)	84 mm × 86.6 mm (3.31 in × 3.41 in)	SEAT 124D, SEAT 131, SEAT 132
2.0 L (1,995 cc)	84 mm × 90 mm (3.31 in × 3.54 in)	Fiat Spider 2000, Fiat 131, Fiat 132/Argenta, Fiat Strada/Ritmo/Regata, Fiat Croma, Fiat Tipo/Tempra, Fiat Coupé; Lancia Beta, Lancia Beta Coupe/HPE, Lancia Delta/Prisma, Lancia Dedra, Lancia Thema; SEAT 131 2000TC, SEAT Ronda SX; FSO Polonez
2.1 L (2,111 cc)	85 mm × 93 mm (3.35 in × 3.66 in)	Lancia 037 Evo II (also supercharged); SEAT 124-16v Gr.5 1977

== Engine Codes ==
Code	Displacement	Engine power	Notes
154A2.000	1,995 cc (121.7 cu in)	155 hp (116 kW)	
124AC3.000	1,438 cc (87.8 cu in)	90 hp (67 kW)	
124AC.000	1,438 cc (87.8 cu in)	90 hp (67 kW)	
124AC.040	1,438 cc (87.8 cu in)	96 hp (72 kW)	
132A.040.4	1,592 cc (97.1 cu in)	95 hp (71 kW)	
132AC.000	1,592 cc (97.1 cu in)	95 hp (71 kW)	
132A9.000	1,592 cc (97.1 cu in)	98 hp (73 kW)	
132AC.040.3	1,592 cc (97.1 cu in)	87 hp (65 kW)	
125BC000	1,608 cc (98.1 cu in)	110 hp (82 kW)	
125BC040	1,608 cc (98.1 cu in)	110 hp (82 kW)	
132AC1.000	1,756 cc (107.2 cu in)	114 / 118 hp (85 / 88 kW)	
132A1.031.5	1,756 cc (107.2 cu in)	83 hp (62 kW)	
132A1.040.4	1,756 cc (107.2 cu in)	86 hp (64 kW)	
132A1.040.5	1,756 cc (107.2 cu in)	86 hp (64 kW)	
131A1.040	1,756 cc (107.2 cu in)	87 hp (65 kW)	
132AC4.000	1,756 cc (107.2 cu in)	128 hp (95 kW)	
132C2.040	1,995 cc (121.7 cu in)	83 hp (62 kW)	
132C2.031	1,995 cc (121.7 cu in)	87 hp (65 kW)	
132C3.031	1,995 cc (121.7 cu in)	102 / 105 hp (76 / 78 kW)	
132V3.031	1,995 cc (121.7 cu in)	135 hp (101 kW)	
125A.000	1,608 cc (98.1 cu in)	90 hp (67 kW)	
125B.000	1,608 cc (98.1 cu in)	100 hp (75 kW)	
131B.000	1,297 cc (79.1 cu in)	77 hp (57 kW)	
131B7.000	1,301 cc (79.4 cu in)	77 hp (57 kW)	
131C1.000	1,367 cc (83.4 cu in)	77 hp (57 kW)	
131B1.000	1,585 cc (96.7 cu in)	95 / 98 hp (71 / 73 kW)	
131C3.000	1,585 cc (96.7 cu in)	97 hp (72 kW)	
132A1.040	1,756 cc (107.2 cu in)	87 hp (65 kW)	
132C2.031	1,995 cc (121.7 cu in)	80 hp (60 kW)	
132C2.040	1,995 cc (121.7 cu in)	86 hp (64 kW)	
132C3.031	1,995 cc (121.7 cu in)	102 hp (76 kW)	
132C3.040	1,995 cc (121.7 cu in)	80 / 105 hp (60 / 78 kW)	
131B2.000	1,995 cc (121.7 cu in)	115 hp (86 kW)	
131C4.000	1,995 cc (121.7 cu in)	115 hp (86 kW)	
132DB.000	1,995 cc (121.7 cu in)	187 hp (139 kW)	
131AR.000	1,995 cc (121.7 cu in)	140 / 215 hp (104 / 160 kW)	
132A.000	1,592 cc (97.1 cu in)	98 hp (73 kW)	
132B.000	1,592 cc (97.1 cu in)	98 hp (73 kW)	
132C.600	1,585 cc (96.7 cu in)	90 hp (67 kW)	
132C.000	1,585 cc (96.7 cu in)	98 hp (73 kW)	
132A1.000	1,756 cc (107.2 cu in)	105 hp (78 kW)	
132B1.000	1,756 cc (107.2 cu in)	107 / 111 hp (80 / 83 kW)	
132CB.0A0	1,585 cc (96.7 cu in)	98 hp (73 kW)	
132C2.000	1,995 cc (121.7 cu in)	112 hp (84 kW)	
132D.000	1,585 cc (96.7 cu in)	98 hp (73 kW)	
132D1.000	1,995 cc (121.7 cu in)	113 hp (84 kW)	
132D4.000	1,995 cc (121.7 cu in)	122 hp (91 kW)	
132C3.000	1,995 cc (121.7 cu in)	122 hp (91 kW)	
132D7.000	1,995 cc (121.7 cu in)	135 hp (101 kW)	
132E.000	1,995 cc (121.7 cu in)	135 hp (101 kW)	
828B3.000	1,297 cc (79.1 cu in)	82 hp (61 kW)	
828C3.000	1,301 cc (79.4 cu in)	84 hp (63 kW)	
828D3.000	1,367 cc (83.4 cu in)	83 hp (62 kW)	
828A2.000	1,438 cc (87.8 cu in)	90 hp (67 kW)	
828A.000	1,592 cc (97.1 cu in)	100 hp (75 kW)	
828AC.000	1,592 cc (97.1 cu in)	108 hp (81 kW)	
828B.000	1,585 cc (96.7 cu in)	100 hp (75 kW)	(until 1982)
828B.000	1,585 cc (96.7 cu in)	108 hp (81 kW)	(82 on)
828A1.000	1,756 cc (107.2 cu in)	110 hp (82 kW)	
828A1.0405	1,756 cc (107.2 cu in)	86 hp (64 kW)	
828AC1.000	1,756 cc (107.2 cu in)	120 hp (89 kW)	
134AS.600	1,756 cc (107.2 cu in)	82 hp (61 kW)	
134AS.0316	1,756 cc (107.2 cu in)	82 hp (61 kW)	
828B1.000	1,995 cc (121.7 cu in)	115 hp (86 kW)	(until 1978)
828B1.000	1,995 cc (121.7 cu in)	119 hp (89 kW)	(1979 on)
828B1.0405	1,995 cc (121.7 cu in)	87 hp (65 kW)	
134AS.000	1,995 cc (121.7 cu in)	120 hp (89 kW)	
828B4.000	1,995 cc (121.7 cu in)	122 hp (91 kW)	
828B4.0405	1,995 cc (121.7 cu in)	108 / 106 hp (81 / 79 kW)	
828B7.000	1,995 cc (121.7 cu in)	135 hp (101 kW)	
834C.000	1,995 cc (121.7 cu in)	166 hp (124 kW)	
838A4.000	1,995 cc (121.7 cu in)	205 hp (153 kW)	(Kappa)
232 AR4	1,995 cc (121.7 cu in)	205 hp (153 kW)	(037 stradale)
232 AR4	2,111 cc (128.8 cu in)	260 / 305 / 325 hp (194 / 227 / 242 kW)	(competition engine, -/EVO1/EVO2)

== Motorsport ==
The Fiat Twin Cam engine has been widely used in motorsport and has been the most successful engine in the history of the World Rally Championship. The World Rally Championship for Manufacturers has been won by Fiat and Lancia, using engines based on the Lampredi Twin Cam engine, for a total of 10 years.

The four valve version made its first appearance in the Group 4 competition version of the Fiat 124 Spider Abarth, where it had 1.8 litres. Group 4 regulations at that time allowed the use of a cylinder head of a "free" design. This engine still used a three-piece cylinder head design with an included valve angle of 46 degrees.

In later years motorsport regulations were changed so that the use of four valve heads was only possible when the homologated cars had four valve heads. Therefore, the homologation series of the Fiat 131 Rally Abarth came with a two-litre version of the four valve engine.

These engines were later used in the mid-engined Lancia 037, where they were supercharged and eventually enlarged to 2.1 litres.

In addition to the titles in the World Rally Championship, the Fiat Twin Cam equipped the Lancia Beta Montecarlo turbo, that won the World Sportscar Championship for two consecutive seasons in 1980–1981.

The Fiat Twin Cam has also been used in hot rods and kit cars, with an aftermarket kit to swap one into the Morris Minor.

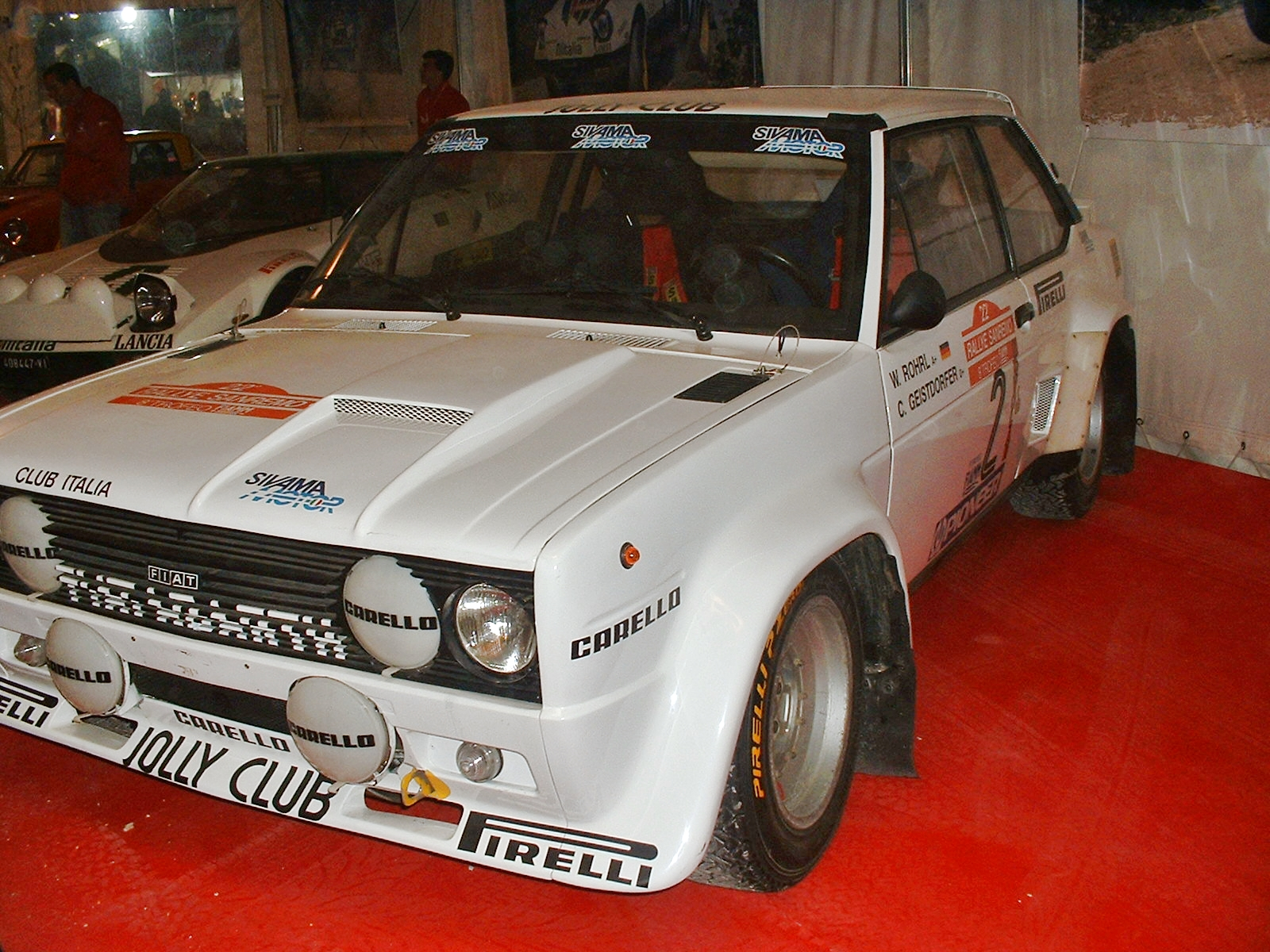
Fiat 131 Abarth of Walter Röhrl at 1980 Rallye Sanremo

Constructor	Car used in World Championship	Seasons	Manufacturers' titles
(Italy) Fiat	Fiat 124 Abarth	1970–1975	—
(Spain) SEAT	SEAT 1430-1800	1974–1976	—
(Italy) Lancia	Lancia Beta coupe	1974–1975	—
(Spain) SEAT	SEAT 124D Gr	1977–1978	—
(Italy) Fiat	Fiat 131 Abarth	1976–1982	3 (1977, 1978, 1980)
(Italy) Lancia	Lancia 037	1982–1986	1 (1983)
(Italy) Lancia	Lancia Delta HF 4WD and Delta Integrale	1987–1993	6 (1987–1992)

== See also ==
- Fiat Pratola Serra modular engines
