= Sofim =

Diesel engine plant

Sofim (Italian: Società franco-italiana di motori) is a joint diesel engine enterprise established between Fiat, Saviem (Renault) and Alfa Romeo on 13 September 1974 and was bought by Iveco in 1981. The manufacturing plant is located in Foggia in southern Italy and is nowadays Fiat Powertrain Technologies largest engine plant covering an area of approximately 540,000 square metres (5,800,000 sq ft).

In 1977 Sofim presented the 8140 diesel engine range: a 2.0-liter (1,995 cc) four-cylinder 65 PS (48 kW) and 2.4-liter (2,445 cc) four-cylinder 72 PS (53 kW). These engines were used in light commercial vehicle Saviem SG2, OM Grinta and in the Fiat Daily (Iveco Daily). These engines were used also in Fiat 131 and 132 models.

Today, light trucks Fiat Ducato III and Iveco Daily uses Sofim engine of 2.3 L of 96–116 PS (71–85 kW) and 3.0 L 120–166 PS (88–122 kW). Iveco also provides engines for Fuso, the Asian subsidiary of Daimler AG, a 3.0-liter engines for its light-duty vehicles.

== See also ==
- JTD engine
