= Sofim 8140 engine =

Overview
- Manufacturer: Sofim
- Also called: Renault S-Type engine
- Production: 1978–2006

Layout
- Valvetrain: SOHC 8v

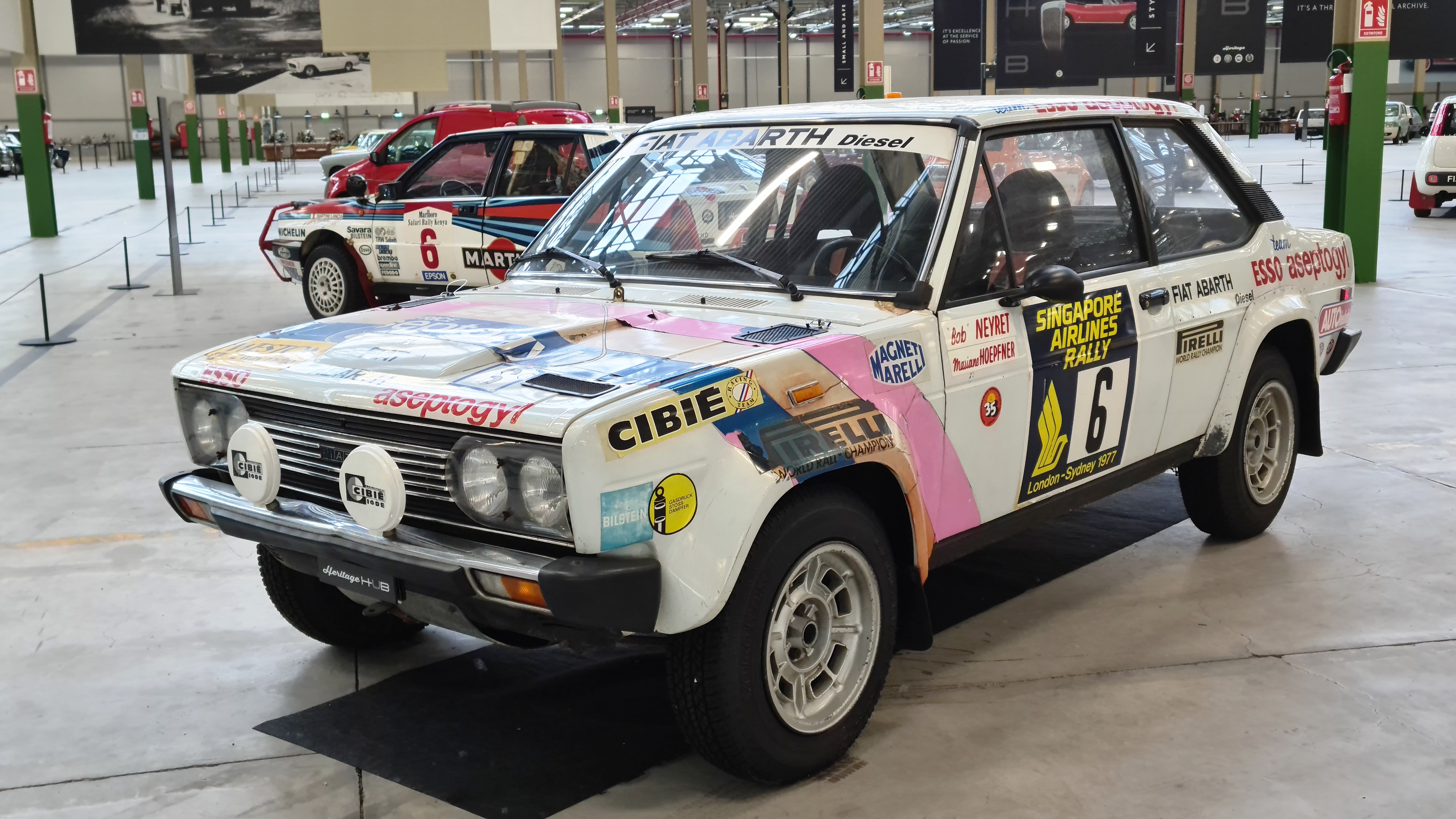
Fiat 131 Abarth diesel concept as tested during the 1977 London-Sydney Marathon rally.

The 8140 was a diesel engine made by Sofim for cars. Originally introduced as a swirl chamber, naturally aspirated diesel it was mostly used in commercial vehicles worldwide.

At the time of introduction, the 8140's overhead camshaft layout (driven by a toothed timingbelt) was unexpected in a diesel engine, which were typically overhead valve designs. Turbocharging the original engine, the design of which was finished in 1974, was impeded until 1985 due to restrictions of the original design. Heat flux issues with the aluminium head and swirl chambers were eventually overcome, but did slow down development. Before entering the market, Fiat tested the Sofim engine in its 131 model during the 1977 London-Sydney Marathon.

First direct injection models also appeared in the mid-1980s.

Additionally to the Fiat designation 8140 some engines got a Renault tag (S8 for indirect injection, S9 for direct injection).

== 2.0 L version ==
In the early beginning there was a 2-litre (1,995 cc) four-cylinder 65 PS (48 kW), called the Sofim 8144.65. Alongside the 2.4-litre version it was used in light commercial vehicles like the Saviem SG2, the first-generation Fiat/Iveco Daily (also marketed as the OM Grinta, Alfa Romeo AR8 Unic Daily, and Magirus Daily), as well as passenger cars like the Fiat 131 and 132 models. It also saw use in the Fiat Campagnola.

== 2.4 L version ==
The original 2.4 L big block displaces 2,445 cc (149.2 cu in), with a bore and stroke of 93 mm × 90 mm (3.7 in × 3.5 in).

Engine type	Displacement cc	Max power PS (kW) at rpm	Max torque N⋅m (lb⋅ft) at rpm	Layout and number of cylinders	Valve / number of valves	Car	Years of production
8144.61	2445	72 (53)/4200	147 N⋅m (108 lb⋅ft)/2400	R4, IDI, naturally aspirated	OHC/8	Fiat 131; Fiat 132; Fiat Argenta; Fiat Campagnola; Fiat Ducato; Iveco Daily	1978–1983; 1978–1981; 1981–1985; 1979–1987; 1981–1989; 1978–1990
S8U 720/722	2445	71 (52)/4200	150 N⋅m (111 lb⋅ft)/2200	R4, IDI, naturally aspirated	OHC/8	Renault Trafic; Renault Master	1981–1989
8144.21	2445	92 (68)/3800	216 N⋅m (159 lb⋅ft)/2200	R4, DI, turbocharged	OHC/8	Fiat Argenta; Fiat Ducato	1983–1985; 1981–1989
8140.21	2445	95 (71)/4100	217 N⋅m (160 lb⋅ft)/2300	R4, DI, turbocharged	OHC/8	Iveco TurboDaily	1980–1990
S8U 750	2445	92 (68)/3800	216 N⋅m (159 lb⋅ft)/2200	R4, IDI, turbocharged	OHC/8	Renault Master B90	1986–1990
8144.91	2445	101 (74)/4100	217 N⋅m (160 lb⋅ft)/2300	R4, IDI, turbocharged, intercooled	OHC/8	Fiat Croma; Lancia Thema	1985–1989; 1984–1988

== 2.5 L version ==
In 1990 the 2.5 L was introduced with a longer stroke, increased by 2 mm to 92 mm. The bore remained unchanged at 93 mm, this version displaces 2,499 cc (152.5 cu in).

Engine type	Displacement cc	Max power PS (kW) at rpm	Max torque N⋅m (lb⋅ft) at rpm	Layout and number of cylinders	Valve / number of valves	Car	Years of production
8140.07	2499	75 PS (55 kW)/4200; 76 PS (56 kW)/4000	162 N⋅m (119 lb⋅ft)/2200 165 N⋅m (122 lb⋅ft)/2400	R4, DI, naturally aspirated	OHC/8	Fiat Ducato; Iveco TurboDaily; Renault Trafic; Renault Master; Renault Messenger; Tarpan Honker	1989–1994; 1990–1994; 1990–1994; 1990–1997; 1990–1999; 1991–1996
8144.67	2499	75 PS (55 kW)/4200	162 N⋅m (119 lb⋅ft)/2200	R4, IDI, naturally aspirated	OHC/8	Fiat Croma; Fiat Ducato	1989–1996; 1989–1994
S9U (8140.67)	2499	80 PS (59 kW)/4000	155 N⋅m (114 lb⋅ft)/2200	R4, IDI, naturally aspirated	OHC/8	Renault Master; Opel Movano; Nissan Interstar	1997–2000; 1998–2000; 1999–2000
8140.67	2499	84 PS (62 kW)/4200	164 N⋅m (121 lb⋅ft)/2400	R4, IDI, naturally aspirated	OHC/8	Fiat Ducato	1994–1999
8140.27	2499	95 PS (70 kW)/3800; 103 PS (76 kW)/3800	216 N⋅m (159 lb⋅ft)/2000 225 N⋅m (166 lb⋅ft)/2000	R4, DI, turbocharged	OHC/8	Fiat Ducato; Iveco TurboDaily; Renault Messenger; Tarpan Honker	1989–1994; 1989–1994; 1989–1996; 1991–1996
S9U (8140.27)	2499	88 PS (65 kW)/3800; 94 PS (69 kW)/3800	200 N⋅m (148 lb⋅ft)/2200 205 N⋅m (151 lb⋅ft)/2200	R4, DI, turbocharged	OHC/8	Renault Master	1989–1990; 1990–1994
8140.47	2499	116 PS (85 kW)/3800	245 N⋅m (181 lb⋅ft)/2000	R4, DI, turbocharged, intercooled	OHC/8	Fiat Ducato; Iveco TurboDaily; Renault Messenger	1994–2002; 1994–2000; 1994–1996
8144.97	2499	116 PS (85 kW)/3900	245 N⋅m (181 lb⋅ft)/2200	R4, IDI, turbocharged, intercooled	OHC/8	Fiat Croma; Lancia Thema	1989–1996
S8U-762 (8144.97)	2499	113 PS (83 kW)/4000	240 N⋅m (177 lb⋅ft)/2000	R4, IDI, turbocharged, intercooled	OHC/8	Renault Safrane	1992–1996

== 2.8 L version ==
The 2.8 L displaces 2800 cc having a larger bore and stroke of 94.4 mm × 100 mm (3.72 in × 3.94 in).

Engine type	Displacement cc	Max power PS (kW) at rpm	Max torque N⋅m (lb⋅ft) at rpm	Layout and number of cylinders	Valve / number of valves	Car	Years of production
8140.63	2799	87 (64)/3800; 85 (63)/3800	180 N⋅m (133 lb⋅ft)/2000	R4, IDI, naturally aspirated	OHC/8	Fiat Ducato; Iveco Daily; Renault Mascott	1998–2000; 1996–1999; 1999–2004
8140.23	2799	103 (76)/3600; 106 (78)/3600	240 N⋅m (177 lb⋅ft)/1900 235 N⋅m (173 lb⋅ft)/1900 250 N⋅m (184 lb⋅ft)/1800	R4, DI, turbocharged	OHC/8	Iveco Daily; Renault Messenger; Renault Mascott	1996–2000; 1996–1999; 1999–2004
S9W (8140.43)	2799	115 (84)/3600	260 N⋅m (192 lb⋅ft)/1800	R4, DI, turbocharged, intercooled	OHC/8	Renault Master; Opel Movano; Nissan Interstar	1997–2000; 1998–2000; 1999–2000
8140.43	2799	118 (87)/3600; 122 (90)/3600	270 N⋅m (199 lb⋅ft)/1800 285 N⋅m (210 lb⋅ft)/1800	R4, DI, turbocharged, intercooled	OHC/8	Fiat Ducato; Citroën Jumper; Peugeot Boxer; Iveco Daily	1997–2000; 1997–2000; 1997–2000; 1996–2000
8140.43S	2799	127 (93,5)/3600; 125 (92)/3600	300 N⋅m (221 lb⋅ft)/1800 290 N⋅m (214 lb⋅ft)/1800	R4, DI, common rail, turbocharged, intercooled	OHC/8	Fiat Ducato; Citroën Jumper; Peugeot Boxer; Iveco Daily; Renault Mascott	2000–2005; 2000–2005; 2000–2005; 2000–2006; 2000–2004
8140.43N	2799	146 (107)/3600	310 N⋅m (229 lb⋅ft)/1500 320 N⋅m (236 lb⋅ft)/1500	R4, DI, common rail, turbocharged, intercooled	OHC/8	Fiat Ducato; Citroën Jumper; Peugeot Boxer; Iveco Daily; Renault Mascott	2000–2005; 2000–2005; 2000–2005; 2000–2006; 2000–2004

== F1A/F1C ==
After continuous development these engines are nowadays known as F1A (2.3 L) and F1C (3.0 L), available for marine and industrial use from Fiat Powertrain Technologies (FPT) and CNH Industrial (since 2012) respectively. The 3-liter version is also built by Mitsubishi Fuso for use in their medium-duty commercials, under the name 4P10.
