= Fiat Croma =

Name used for two different large family cars produced by Italian automaker Fiat

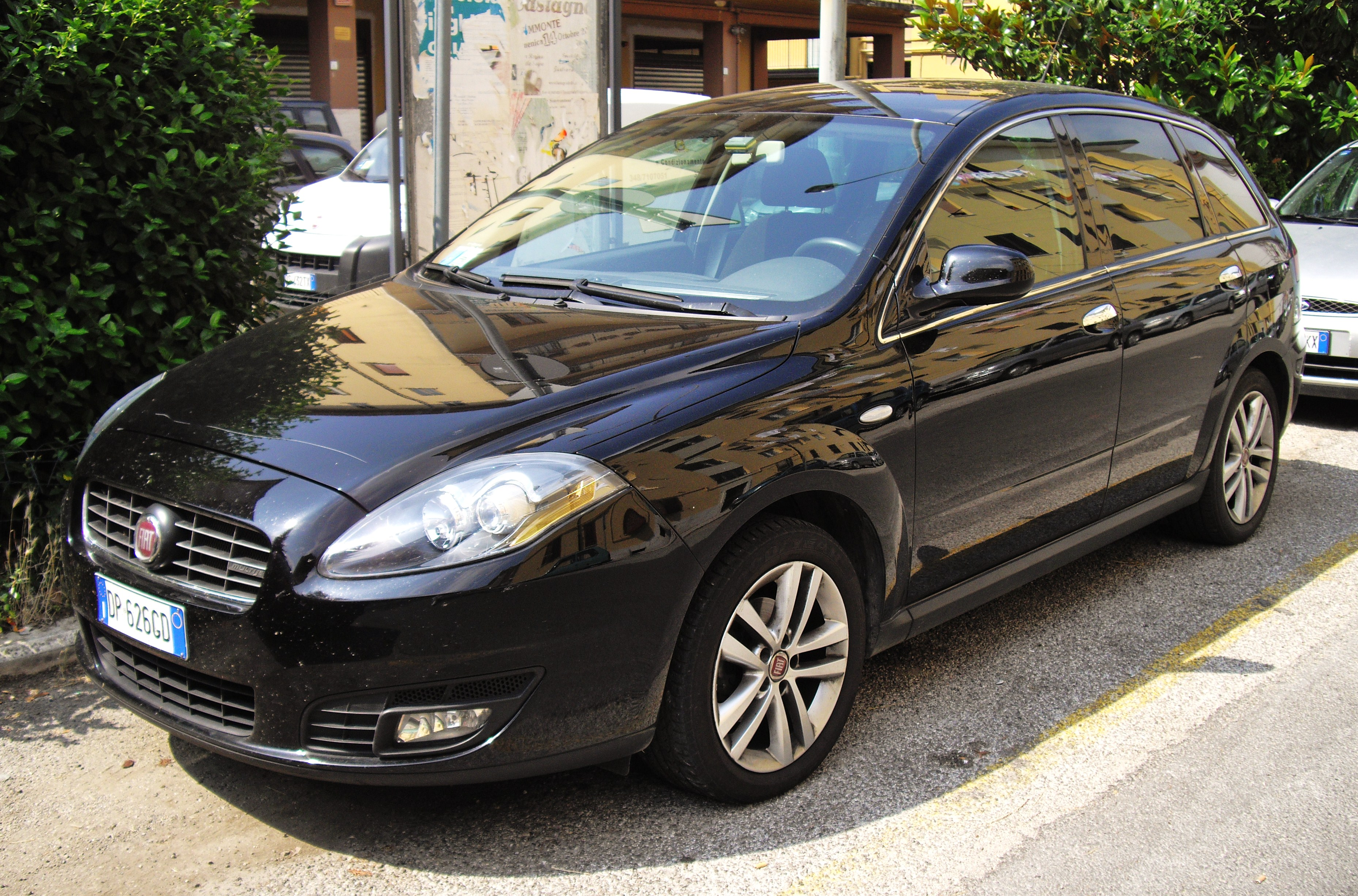

Overview
- Manufacturer: Fiat
- Production: 1985–1996; 2004–2010

Body and chassis
- Class: Large family car (D); MPV (M)
- Layout: Front-engine, front-wheel-drive

Chronology
- Predecessor: Fiat Argenta (as sedan)
- Successor: Fiat Freemont

The Fiat Croma name was used for two distinct large family cars by Fiat, one a five door liftback manufactured and marketed from 1985 to 1996, and after a nine-year hiatus, a crossover station wagon manufactured and marketed from 2004 to 2010.

== First generation (1985–1996) ==
First generation
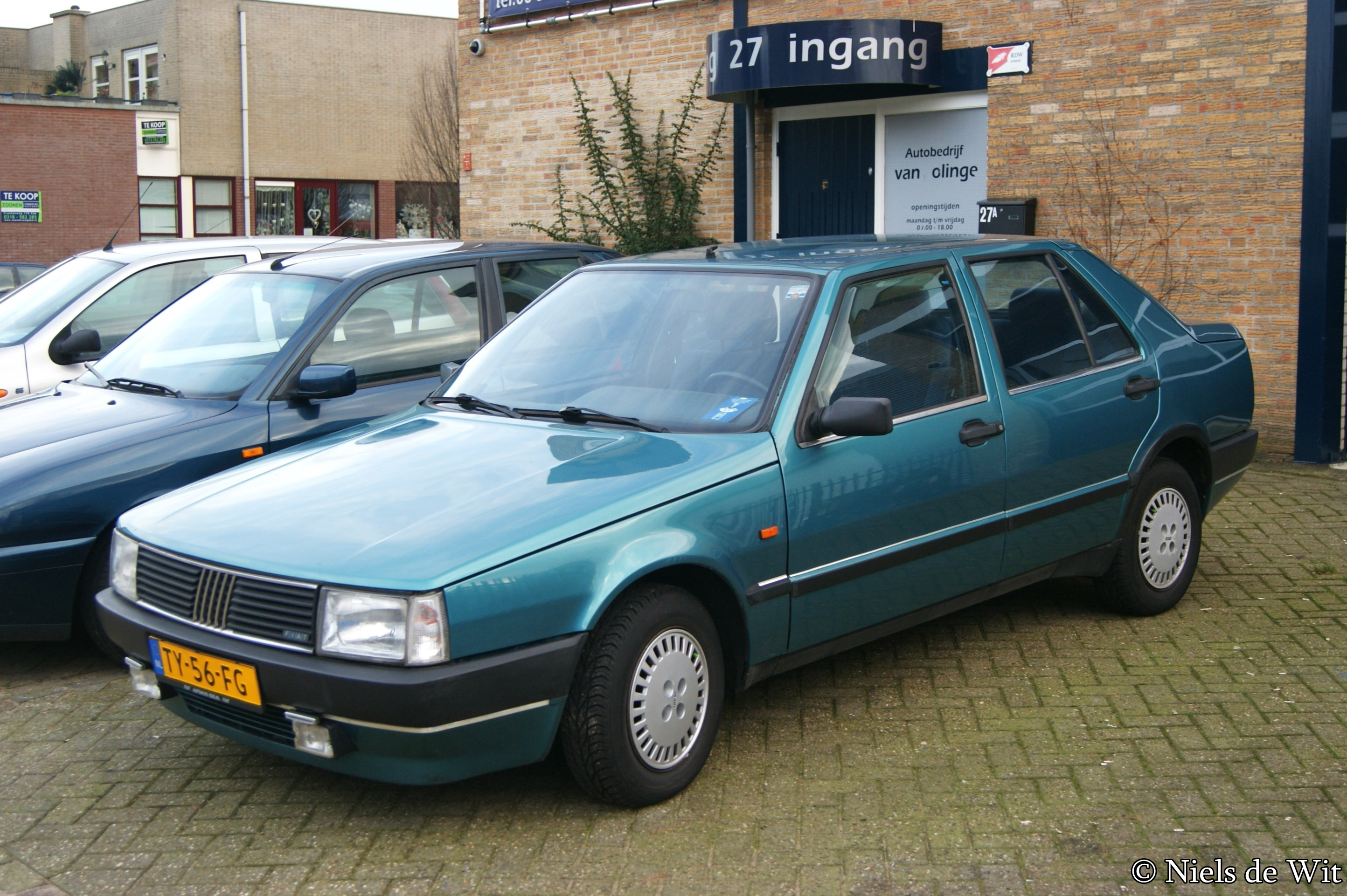
- 1989 Fiat Croma

Overview
- Model code: 154
- Production: 1985–1996
- Assembly: Italy: Mirafiori, Turin
- Designer: Giorgetto Giugiaro at Italdesign

Body and chassis
- Body style: 5-door liftback
- Platform: Tipo Quattro
- Related: Saab 9000; Lancia Thema; Alfa Romeo 164

Powertrain
- Engine: Petrol: 1585 cc 154A.048 I4; 1995 cc Twin Cam I4; 2492 cc Alfa Romeo V6; Diesel: 1929 cc Fiat 124 Series turbo I4; 2445 cc Sofim 8144.91 I4; 2499 cc Sofim 8144.67/97 turbo I4

Dimensions
- Wheelbase: 2,660 mm (104.7 in)
- Length: 4,495 mm (177.0 in)
- Width: 1,755 mm (69.1 in)
- Height: 1,425 mm (56.1 in)
- Curb weight: 1,095 kg (2,414 lb)

Chronology
- Predecessor: Fiat Argenta

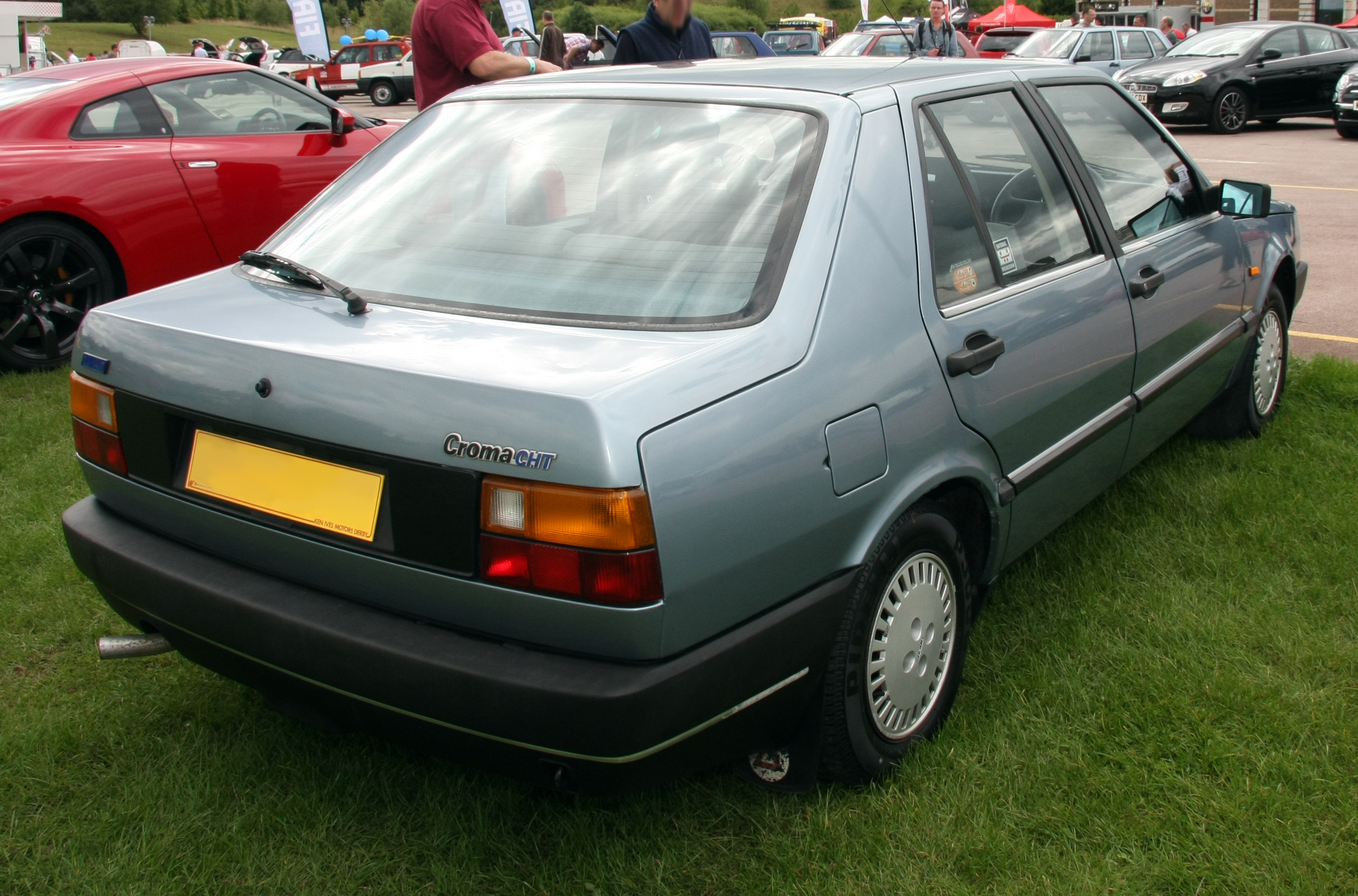
1987 Fiat Croma CHT

The original Croma (Type 154) was a five door notchback liftback styled by Giorgetto Giugiaro of Italdesign using the Type Four platform, cooperatively used with the Saab 9000, Lancia Thema and Alfa Romeo 164.

Released in December 1985, it was marketed in the large family car segment, replacing the Argenta in the Fiat lineup. The Croma was the first large car produced by Fiat to feature a transverse mounted engine and front wheel drive.

=== Facelift ===
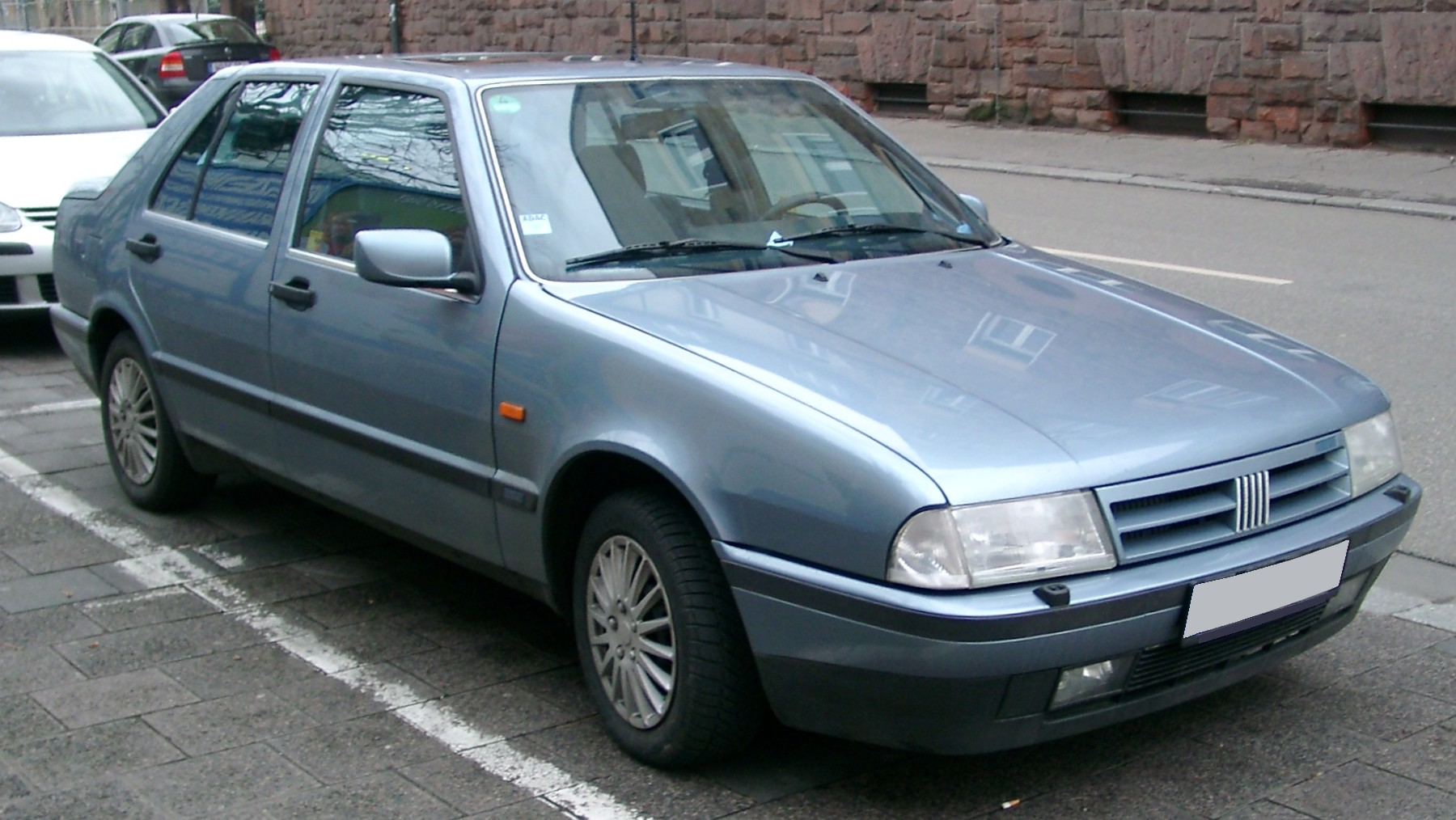
Fiat Croma (after the facelift of 1991).

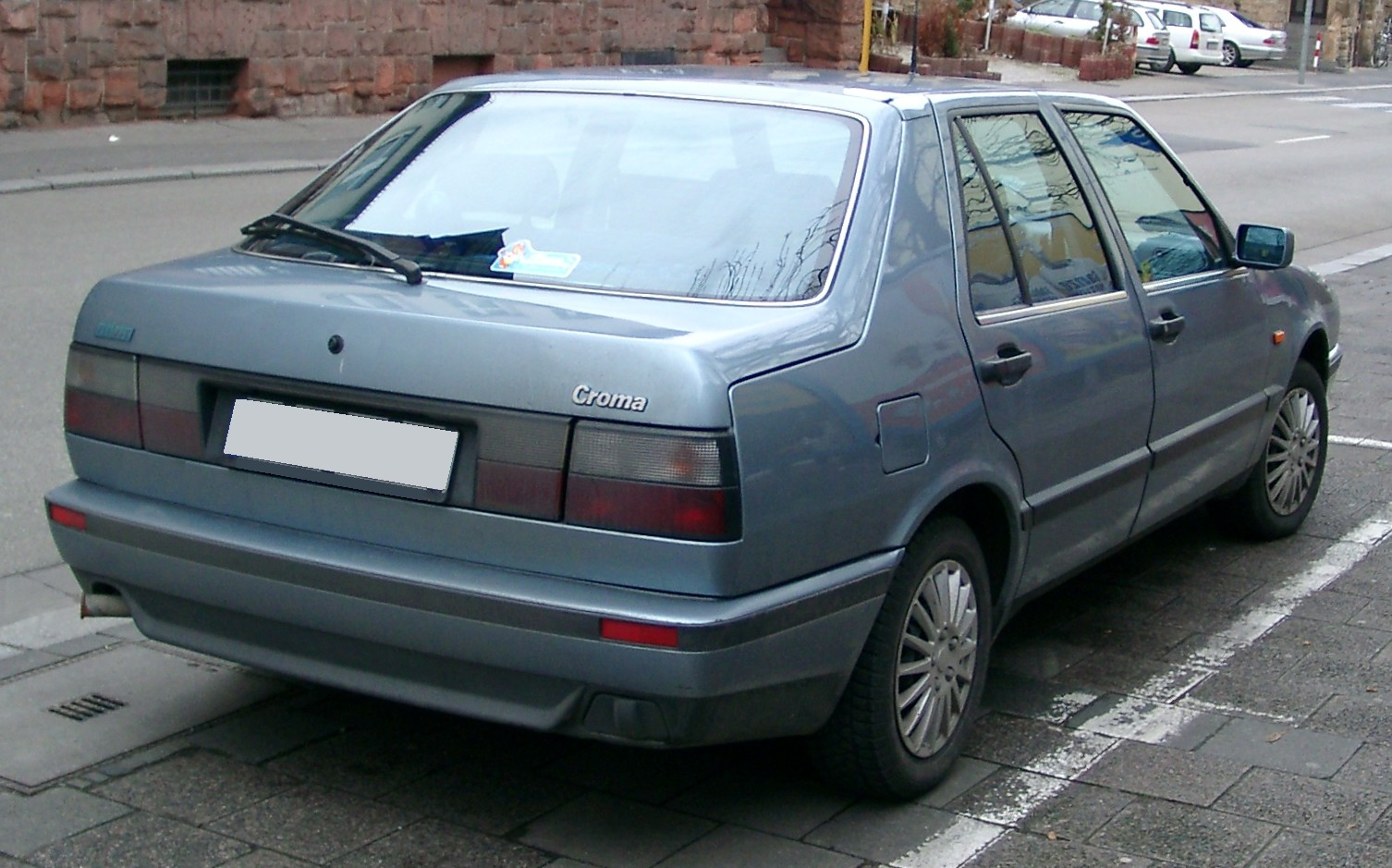
Rear view (post-facelift model)

The Croma received a light facelift for 1988, first shown in Frankfurt in September 1987. The black plastic between the rear lamps was now ridged rather than smooth, the lower portion of the bumpers were body coloured, and the turn signals received clear glass rather than amber.

The front appearance received some other light modifications to bring its appearance in line with that of the recently introduced Tipo.

A more significant facelift was released in January 1991, with a new front design, including changes to the lights, bumpers, grille and sheet metal changes to wings and bonnet. Also in 1991, the direct injected diesel engine was equipped with a variable geometry turbocharger ("VNT"). Another facelift was released in June 1993.

Production ended in December 1996, and Fiat left the large family car segment. The Bravo/Brava based Marea small family car debuted at the same time as the Croma ceased production.

=== Engines ===
The Croma was available with a variety of petrol and diesel engines, most of the petrol units coming from Fiat's Twin Cam engine family.

Base models had a single cam 1,585 cc four-cylinder engine rated at 83 hp (61 kW) and the larger 1,995 cc, "Controlled High Turbulence" (CHT) engine rated at 90 hp (66 kW), followed by two fuel injected 2.0 litre twin cam powerplants, one with 120 hp (88 kW) and the other a turbocharged and intercooled version rated at 155 hp (114 kW).

The later 2.5 L V6 petrol unit was from Alfa Romeo, but as with the 1.6 L engine it was not available in all markets. The 2.0 CHT model was designed specifically to provide low fuel consumption under light and medium loads thanks to two separate inlet manifolds of different diameters. The Fiat Croma CHT was one of the very first cars in volume serial production with variable intake ducts.

The Fiat Croma was also the first passenger car in the world to have a direct injection Diesel (Turbo D i.d.) engine, going on sale in 1988. The 1.9 L fitted with a turbocharger with direct injection produces 92 hp (68 kW). It joined the 2,499 cc unit supplied by Iveco, with a normally aspirated version giving 75 hp (55 kW) and a turbocharged one with 115 hp (85 kW). The latter version replaced the original 2,445 cc with 100 hp (74 kW).

Diesel engined variants of the Croma were not marketed in the United Kingdom.

==== Petrol ====
Model	Engine	Displacement	Power
1.6	I4 SOHC 8V	1585 cc	83 hp (61 kW)
CHT	I4 DOHC 8V	1995 cc	90 hp (66 kW)
CHT	I4 DOHC 8V	1995 cc	101 hp (74 kW)
i.e.	I4 DOHC 8V	1995 cc	113 hp (83 kW)
i.e.	I4 DOHC 8V	1995 cc	115 hp (85 kW)
i.e.	I4 DOHC 8V	1995 cc	120 hp (88 kW)
i.e. 16V	I4 DOHC 16V	1995 cc	137 hp (101 kW)
i.e. Turbo	I4 DOHC 8V	1995 cc	150 hp (110 kW)
i.e. Turbo	I4 DOHC 8V	1995 cc	155 hp (114 kW)
V6	V6 SOHC 12V	2492 cc	160 hp (118 kW)

==== Diesel ====
Model	Engine	Displacement	Power
Turbo D i.d.	I4 SOHC 8V	1929 cc	92 hp (68 kW)
Diesel	I4 SOHC 8V	2499 cc	75 hp (55 kW)
Turbo Diesel	I4 SOHC 8V	2445 cc	100 hp (74 kW)
2500 TD	I4 SOHC 8V	2499 cc	101 hp (74 kW)
2500 TD	I4 SOHC 8V	2499 cc	115 hp (85 kW)
2500 TDE	I4 SOHC 8V	2499 cc	105 hp (77 kW)

== Second generation (2005–2010) ==
Second generation
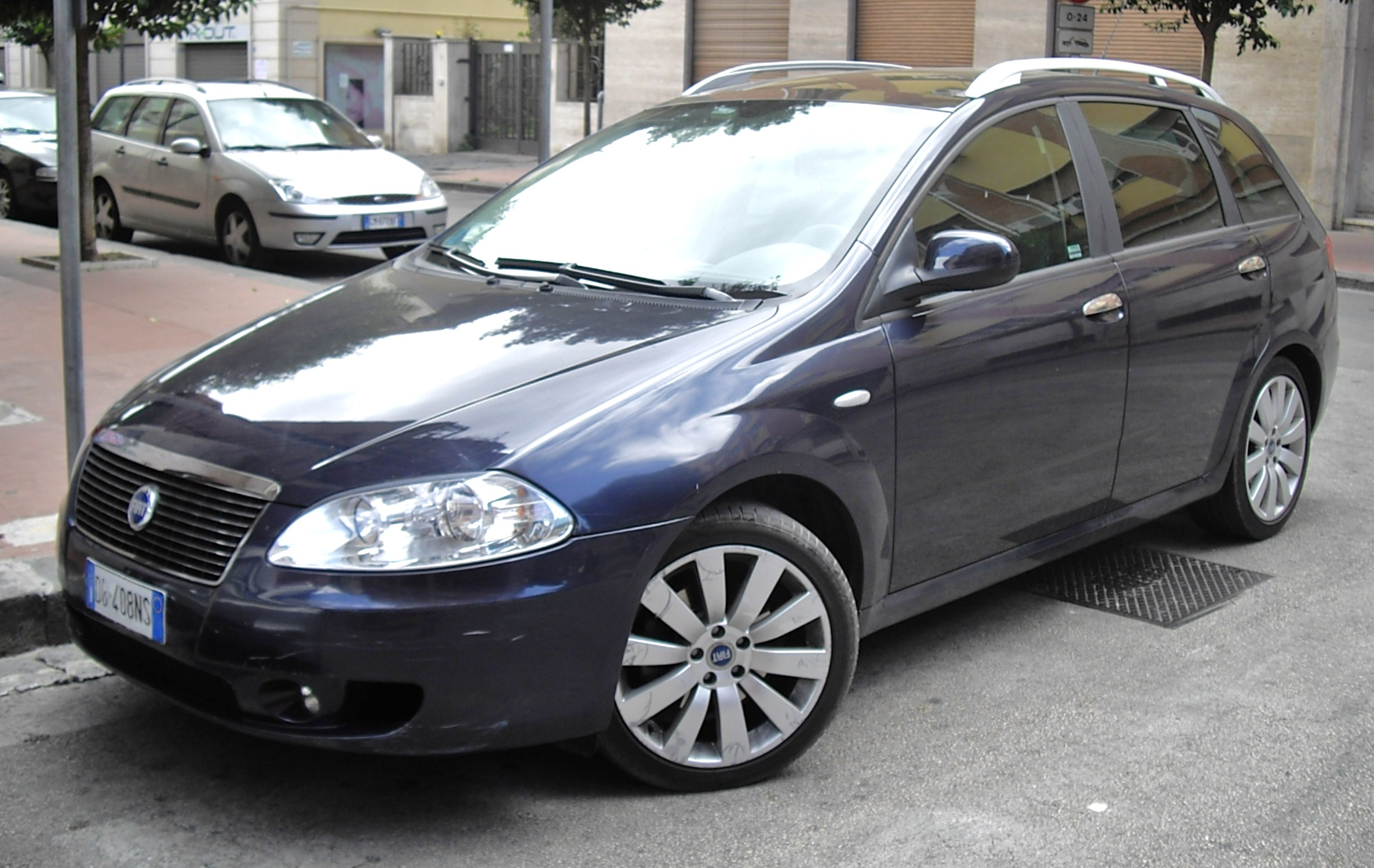

Overview
- Model code: 194
- Production: 2004–2010 (LHD); 2005–2007 (RHD)
- Assembly: Italy: Cassino, Frosinone
- Designer: Giorgetto Giugiaro at Italdesign

Body and chassis
- Body style: 5-door wagon
- Platform: GM Epsilon platform
- Related: Cadillac BLS; Opel Signum; Opel Vectra; Saab 9-3

Powertrain
- Engine: Petrol: 1.8 L Family I I4 16V; 2.2 L Ecotec I4 16V; Diesel: 1.9 L Multijet 8V/16V common rail, turbo I4; 2.4 L Multijet 20V common rail turbo I5
- Transmission: 5- and 6-speed manual 6-speed automatic

Dimensions
- Wheelbase: 2,700 mm (110 in)
- Length: 4,755 mm (187.2 in); 4,783 mm (188.3 in) (facelift)
- Width: 1,775 mm (69.9 in)
- Height: 1,600 mm (63.0 in)

Chronology
- Successor: Fiat Freemont

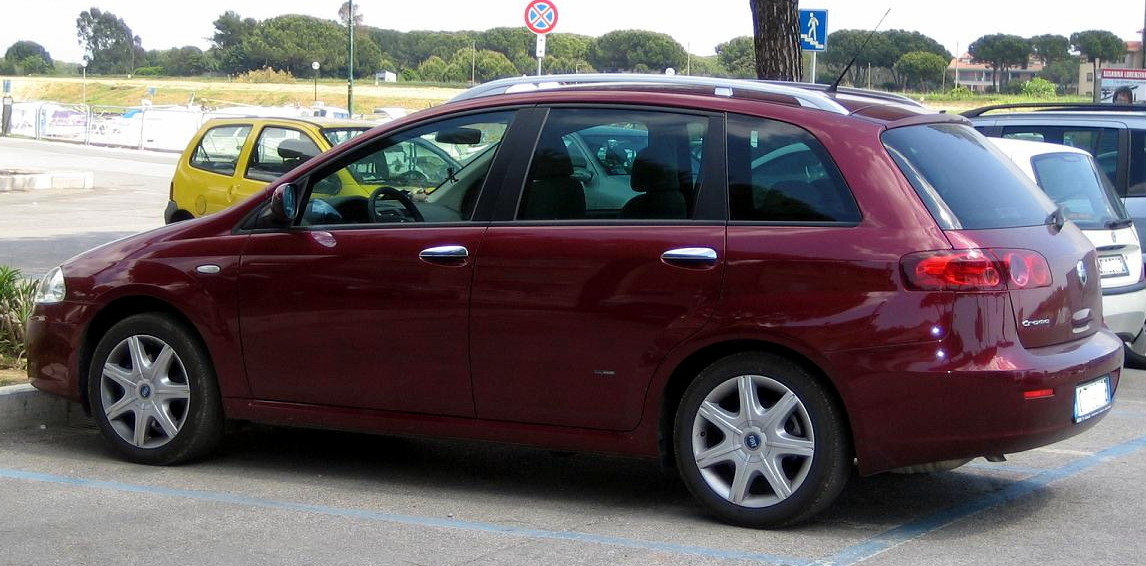
Fiat Croma (2006)

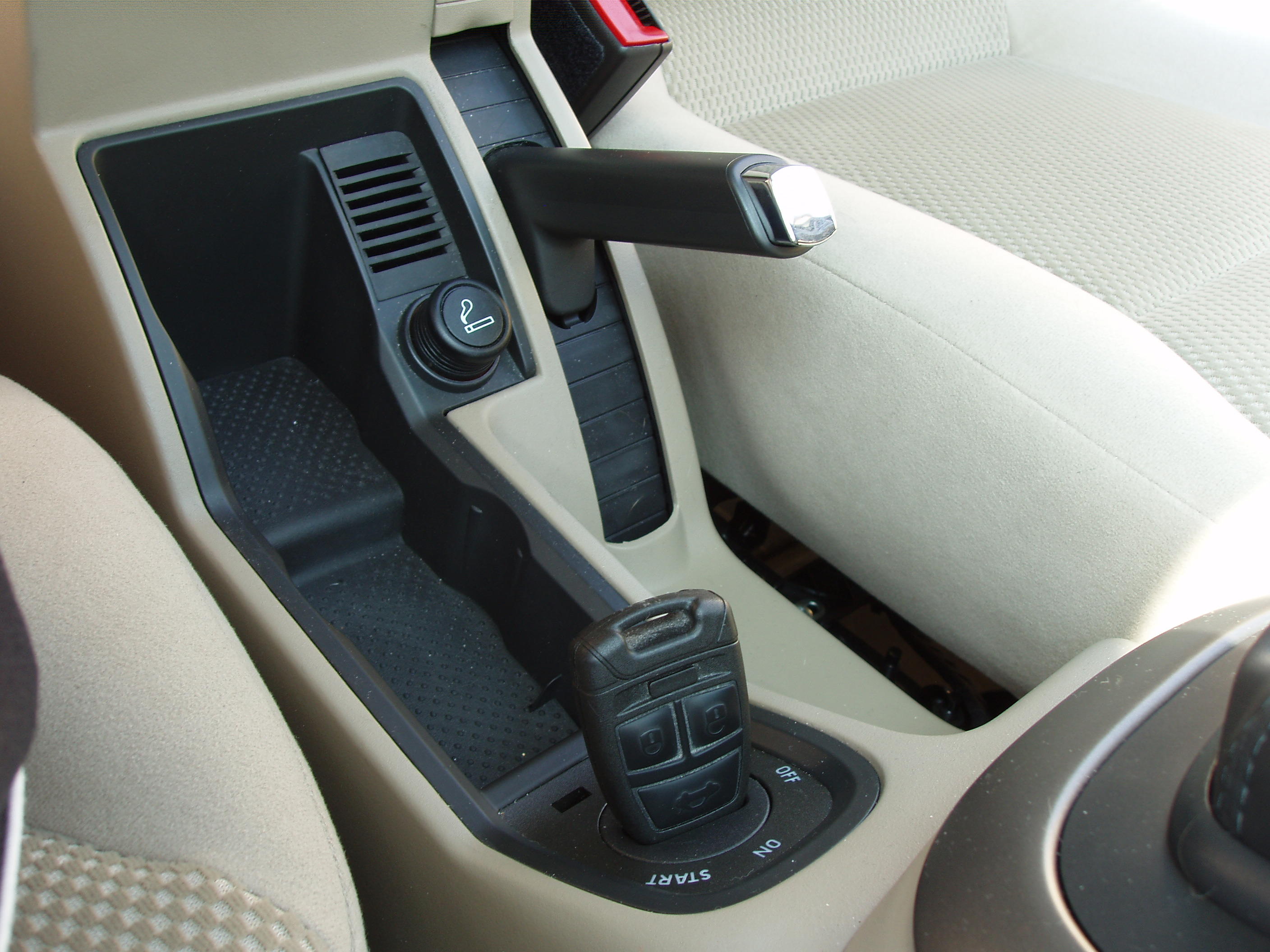
The ignition key between the seats shows that the Croma shares its platform with the Saab 9-3

In March 2005, Fiat introduced the second generation Croma: a large high-roof, five passenger, crossover wagon with an upright tailgate, with styling by Italdesign.

Reflecting Fiat's short term joint venture with General Motors, the new Croma, internally designated the Type 194, used an extended variant of the GM Epsilon platform sharing components with the Opel Vectra, Opel Signum and Saab 9-3. It was presented at the Geneva Motor Show in spring 2005 and went on sale in Italy in June of that year.

Aware of its lack of image in the upper market segments, Fiat opted for developing a "Comfort Wagon", an automobile with design elements of both estates and large MPVs, instead of developing a standard large family car like the previous model. To underline this niche, Italdesign produced a one-off Croma 8tto V Concept featuring a Maserati V8 engine and top-of-the-line exterior and interior appointments.

Its height of 1,600 mm (63.0 in) falls between that of the Mitsubishi Grandis and Ford S-Max large MPVs (1,655 mm (65.2 in) and 1,660 mm (65.4 in) respectively) and SEAT Altea XL (1,525 mm (60.0 in)). In February 2007, Fiat UK announced that the Croma would no longer be generally available in the United Kingdom, after less than 900 had been sold in 2005.

The car was still offered, but only on special order, with right-hand drive models manufactured to customer specifications. Production of the second generation Croma ended at the end of 2010 and the car was replaced by the Dodge-based Fiat Freemont.

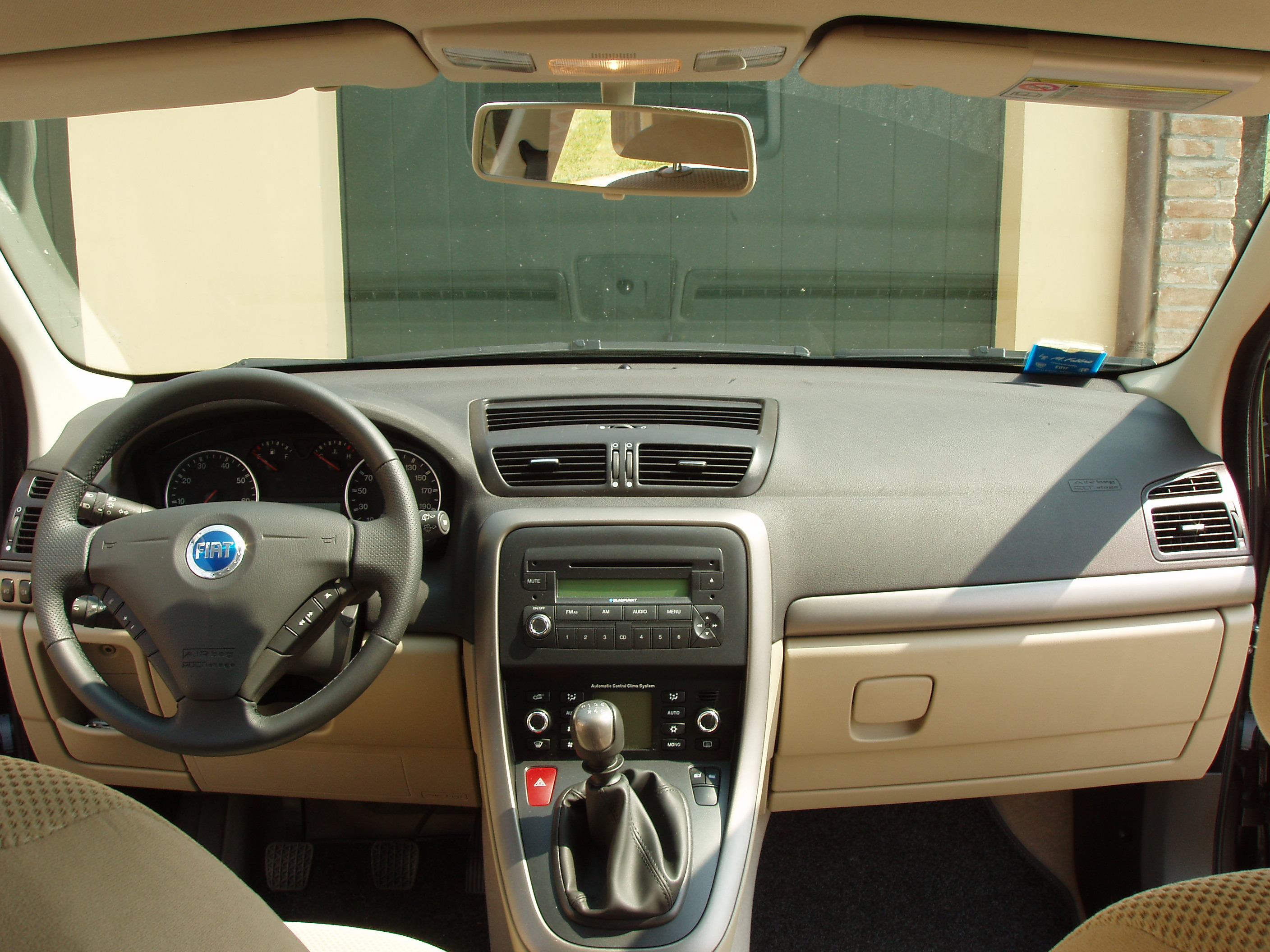
Croma pre-facelift interior

=== Safety ===
The Croma features seven airbags, anti-lock braking system, electronic brakeforce distribution, and received a five star Euro NCAP crash rating for adult occupant protection:

Euro NCAP test results* Fiat Croma (2008)
Test	Score	Rating
Adult occupant:	34	5 /5 stars
Child occupant:	39	4 /5 stars
Pedestrian:	6	1 /4 stars

=== Facelift ===
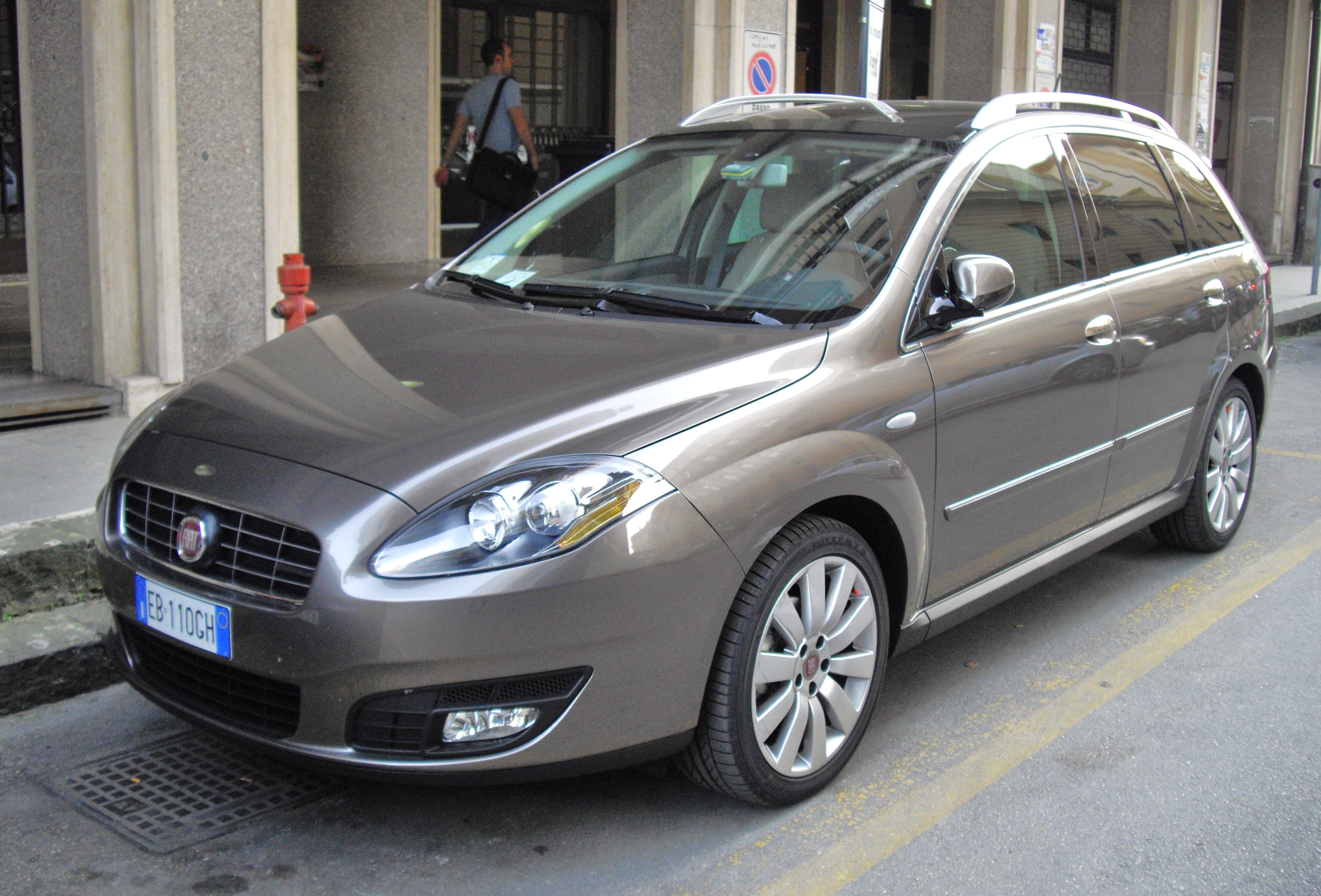
Facelifted Fiat Croma

The Croma received a facelift in November 2007, and was termed the Nuova Croma, featuring a revised grille, headlights, rear bumper, as well as interior changes, now designated a "Station Wagon" rather than "Comfort Wagon". The Nuova Croma was only sold in mainland Europe, excluding the United Kingdom.

=== Engines ===
The Croma was manufactured at Fiat's Cassino factory with three trim levels and five engine options. As with the chassis, petrol engines were supplied by Opel, beginning with the brand new evolution of the Family 1 Ecotec 1.8 L with 140 hp (103 kW), followed by the torquier L850 Ecotec 2.2 L with 147 hp (108 kW).

Most examples featured Fiat's own Multijet engine, available in three variants: 1.9 L with 8 valves and 120 hp (88 kW), 1.9 L with 16 valves and 150 hp (110 kW), and the range topping, five-cylinder 20-valve 2.4 L five-cylinder with 200 hp (147 kW). The diesel engines were fitted with a standard six-speed manual gearbox, a six-speed automatic was also available and was standard on the 2.4 engines.

==== Petrol ====
Model	Engine	Displacement	Power	Torque
1.8 MPI 16V	DOHC 16V I4	1796 cc	140 hp (103 kW) at 6300 rpm	175 N⋅m (129 lb⋅ft) at 3800 rpm
2.2 MPI 16V	DOHC 16V I4	2198 cc	147 hp (108 kW) at 5800 rpm	203 N⋅m (150 lb⋅ft) at 4000 rpm

==== Diesel ====
Model	Engine	Displacement	Power	Torque
1.9 MultiJet 8V	SOHC 8V I4	1910 cc	120 hp (88 kW) at 4,000 rpm	280 N⋅m (207 lb⋅ft) at 2,000 rpm
1.9 MultiJet 16V	DOHC 16V I4	1910 cc	150 hp (110 kW) at 4,000 rpm	320 N⋅m (236 lb⋅ft) at 2,000 rpm
2.4 MultiJet 20V	DOHC 20V I5	2387 cc	200 hp (147 kW) at 4,000 rpm	400 N⋅m (295 lb⋅ft) at 2,000 rpm
