= SEAT 132 =

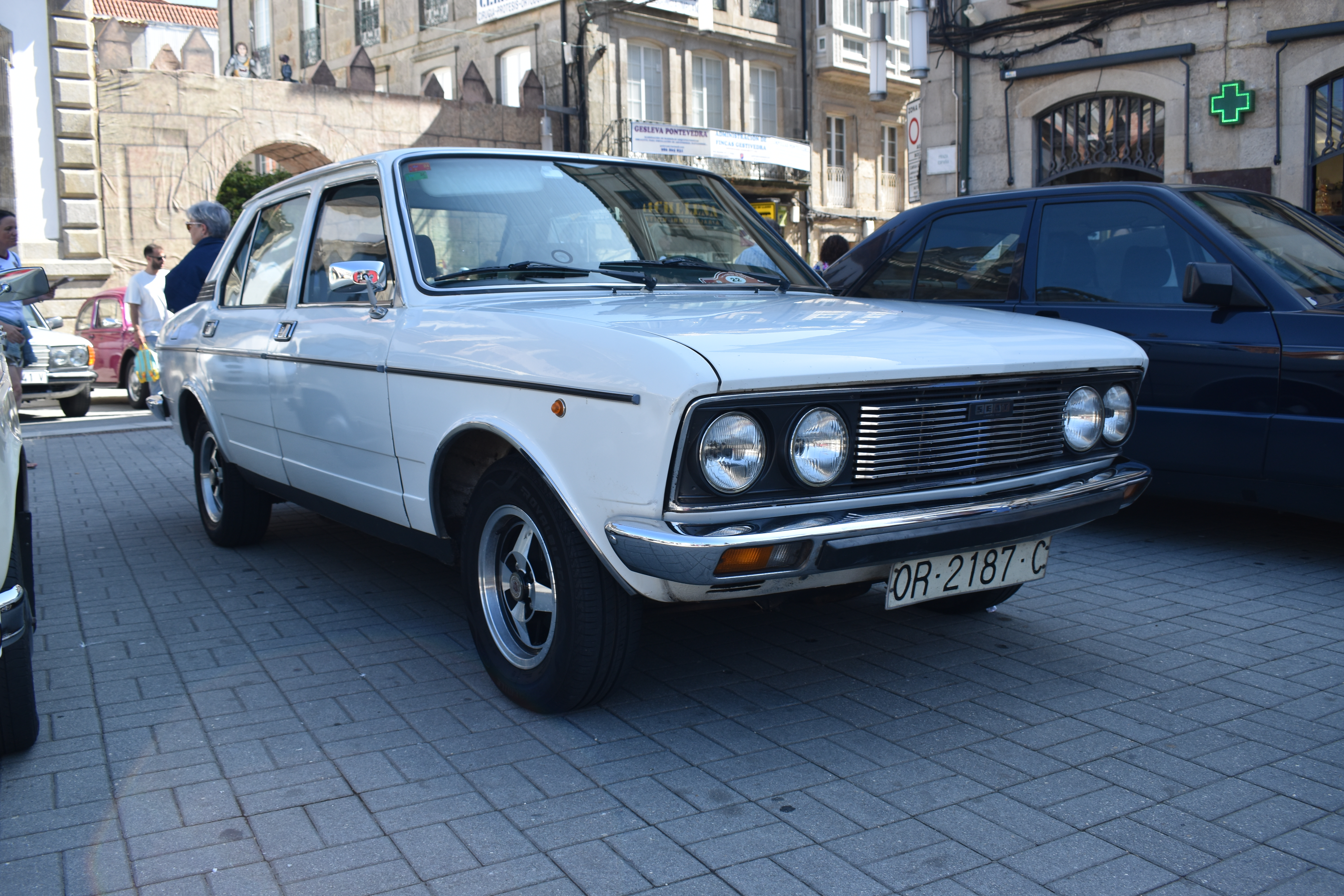
- SEAT 132 L 1800 (second series)

Overview
- Manufacturer: SEAT
- Production: May 1973–1982
- Assembly: Spain: Barcelona (Zona Franca)
- Designer: Marcello Gandini

Body and chassis
- Class: Large family car (D)
- Body style: 4-door saloon
- Layout: FR layout
- Related: Fiat 132

Powertrain
- Engine: 1.6–1.9L I4 (Gasoline); 2.0–2.2L I4 (Diesel)
- Transmission: 4 and 5-speed manual 3-speed automatic

Dimensions
- Wheelbase: 2,557 mm (100.7 in)
- Length: 4,392 mm (172.9 in)
- Width: 1,640 mm (65 in)
- Height: 1,435 mm (56.5 in)

Chronology
- Predecessor: SEAT 1500
- Successor: SEAT Exeo

The SEAT 132 is a four door, rear wheel drive notchback saloon produced by SEAT from 1973 to 1982, as a rebadged version of the Fiat 132. It was presented for the first time at the Barcelona Motor Show, and was assembled in Barcelona's Zona Franca in Catalonia, Spain.

== Overview ==
The 132 was SEAT's new flagship car shared its body with the Fiat 132, but when launched in May 1973 it featured its own engine options:

- The SEAT 132 1600 had a four cylinder 1592 cc engine of 98 bhp (73 kW; 99 PS) .

- The SEAT 132 1800 had a four cylinder 1756 cc engine of 107 bhp (80 kW; 108 PS) .

- The SEAT 132 Diesel featured a two litre 55 bhp (41 kW; 56 PS) Mercedes Benz engine, corresponding to that offered in the Mercedes Benz 200D. This followed the pattern established with the SEAT 1500, which had also been available with a diesel engine from Mercedes Benz.

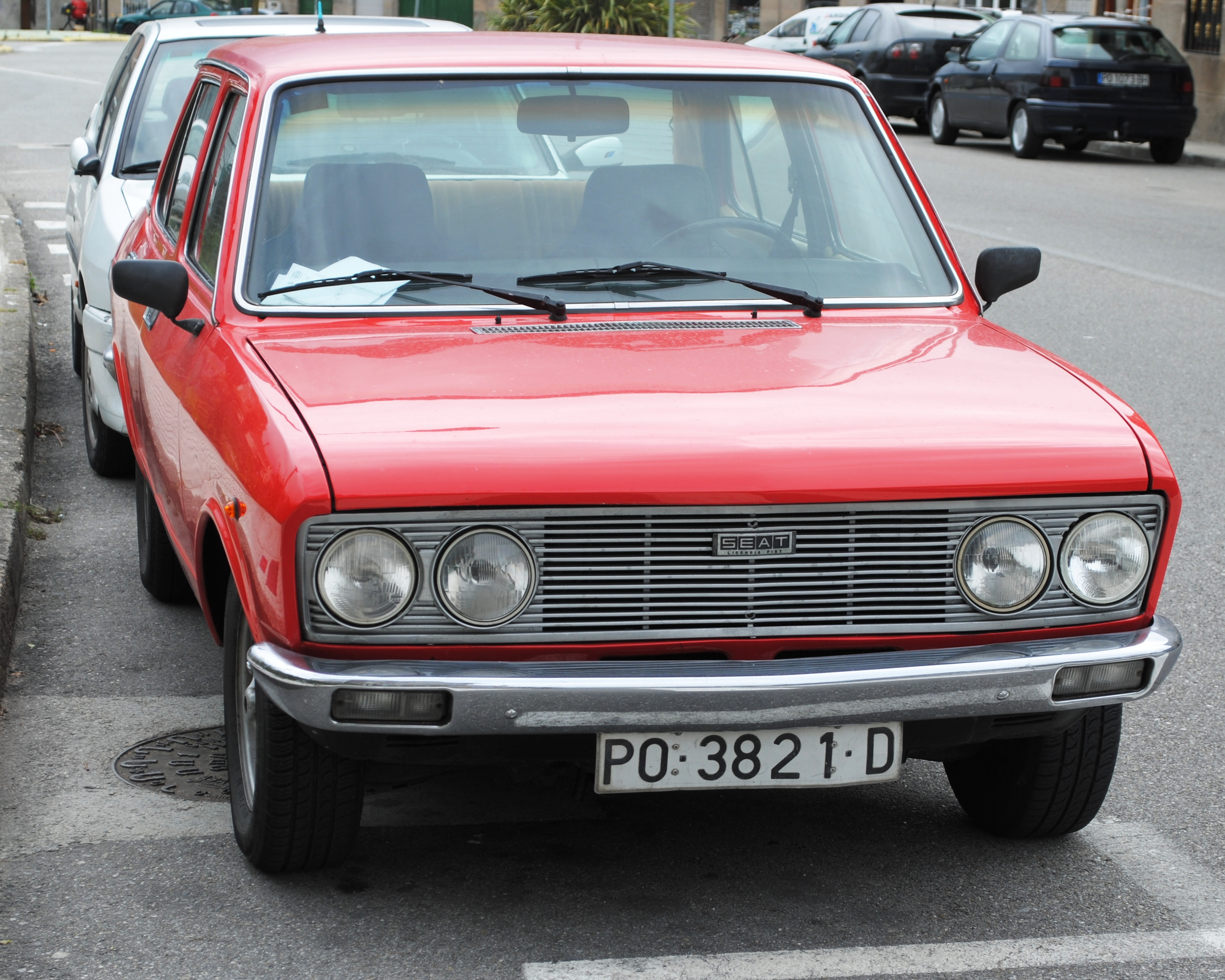
1973 SEAT 132 (first series)

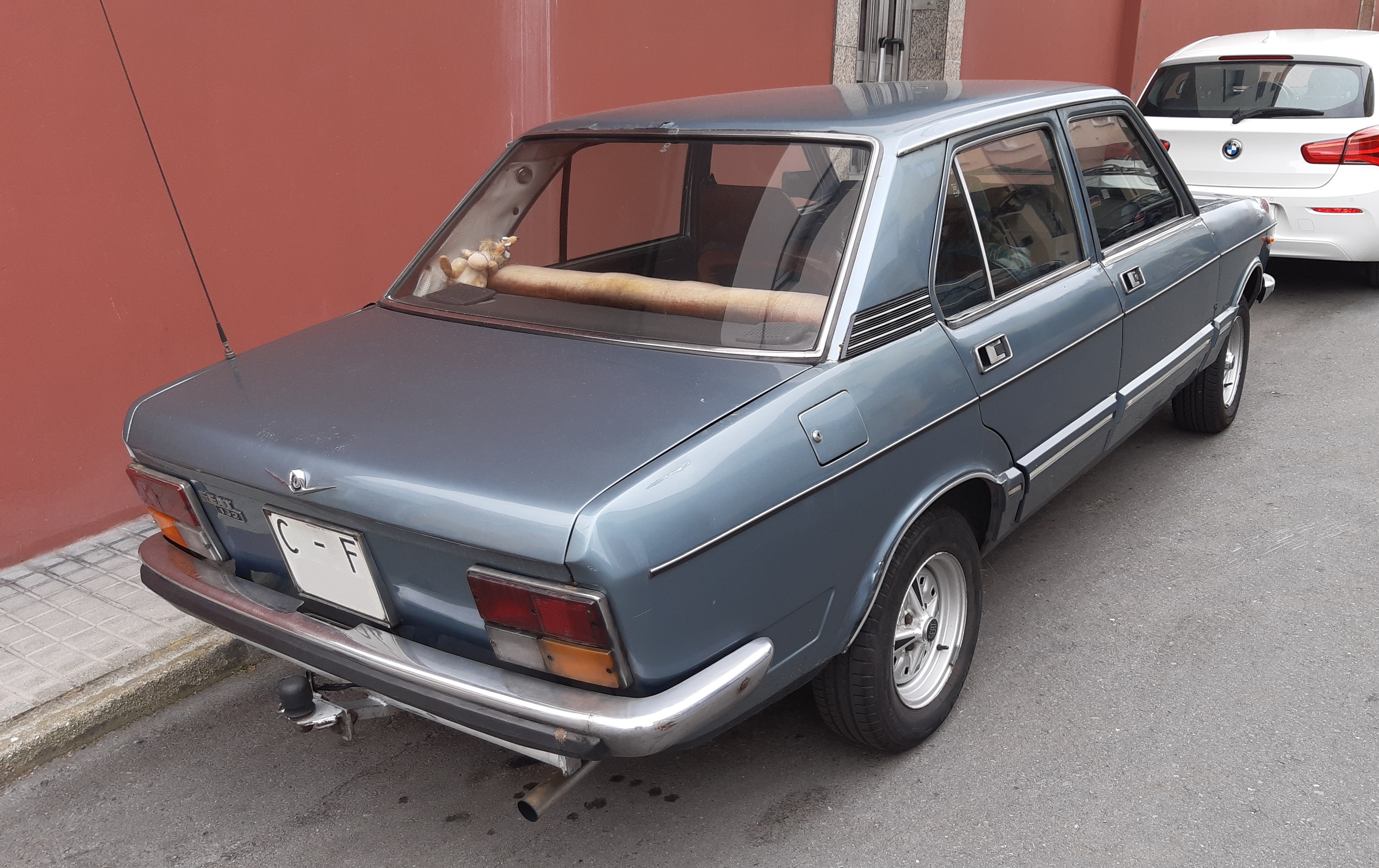
Rear view (second series)

For the important taxi market, the 132 filled the niche, vacated with the withdrawal in 1970, of the diesel engined SEAT 1500, the 132 being usefully larger than the SEAT 124, which was SEAT's largest model during the beginning of the 1970s.

In 1974 the model received a restyling, adapting its specifications to those of the second series of the Fiat 132.

In 1976, an automatic transmission option was offered, which may have been a response to the success in Spain of the locally assembled, and similarly enhanced Chrysler Two Litre. From 1979, the SEAT 132 2000 became available, with one four cylinder 1920 cc engine of 109 bhp (81 kW; 111 PS): in due course, one larger 2.2 litre, four cylinder Mercedes diesel version was also offered.

In the beginning of the 1980s, extensive discussions concerning funding and control took place between the major share holder, the Government of Spain, and Fiat: SEAT needed major capital investment, which Fiat was not prepared to inject. The outcome, by 1982, was an end after nearly thirty years, to the relationship with Fiat.

Already in 1981, Fiat having by now switched to their new model, the Argenta, production of the SEAT 132 ceased, after approximately 100,000 examples had been produced. No direct replacement in this class was, up until 2009, offered by the company. The SEAT Exeo could be seen as the belated replacement, however.

== Technical specifications ==
Technical data SEAT 132
SEAT 132	1600	1800	1900	Diesel 2000	Diesel 2200
Engine:	Four cylinder inline engine (four stroke), front mounted				
Displacement:	1592 cc	1756 cc	1920 cc	1988 cc	2197 cc
Bore x Stroke:	80 x 79.2 mm	84 x 79.2 mm	84 x 86.6 mm	87 x 83.6 mm	87 x 92.4 mm
Max. Power @ rpm:	98 hp (73 kW) @ 6000	107 hp (80 kW) @ 6000	109 hp (81 kW) @ 5800	55 hp (41 kW) @ 4200	60 hp (45 kW) @ 4200
Max. Torque @ rpm:	129 N⋅m (95 lb⋅ft) @ 3400	141 N⋅m (104 lb⋅ft) @ 4000	151 N⋅m (111 lb⋅ft) @ 3000	113 N⋅m (83 lb⋅ft) @ 2400	126 N⋅m (93 lb⋅ft) @ 2400
Compression Ratio:	9.0:1	8.9:1	8.9:1	21.0:1	
Fuel system:	1 Weber or Solex downdraft carb. (2bbl)			Diesel injection	
Valvetrain:	DOHC, tooth belt			OHC, chain	
Cooling:	Water				
Gearbox:	Four speed manual	Four speed manual Five speed manual optional GM Three speed automatic optional rear wheel drive		Four speed manual	
Front suspension:	Upper double wishbones, lower wishbones, coil springs, stabilizing bar				
Rear suspension::	Live axle, upper wishbones, lower trailing arms, coil springs				
Brakes:	Front and rear disc brakes (Ø 227 mm)				
Steering:	Recirculating ball steering, power-assisted				
Body:	Steel, unibody construction				
Track front/rear:	1,320 mm (52 in) / 1,325 mm (52.2 in)				
Wheelbase:	2,555 mm (100.6 in)				
Length x Width x Height:	4,380 mm (172 in) x 1,640 mm (65 in) x 1,430 mm (56 in) mm				
Weight:	1,070 kg (2,360 lb)	1,095 kg (2,414 lb)	1,140 kg (2,510 lb)	1,100 kg (2,400 lb)	1,215 kg (2,679 lb)
Top speed:	165 km/h (103 mph)	170 km/h (110 mph)	170 km/h (110 mph)	130 km/h (81 mph)	140 km/h (87 mph)
0–100 km/h (0−62 mph):	12.5 s	11.2 s	11.2 s	n.a.	
Fuel consumption (estimates):	10.0 litres per 100 kilometres (28 mpg_{‑imp}; 24 mpg_{‑US})−15.0 litres per 100 kilometres (18.8 mpg_{‑imp}; 15.7 mpg_{‑US})			7.0 litres per 100 kilometres (40 mpg_{‑imp}; 34 mpg_{‑US})−9.5 litres per 100 kilometres (30 mpg_{‑imp}; 25 mpg_{‑US})	
