= Fiat 132 =

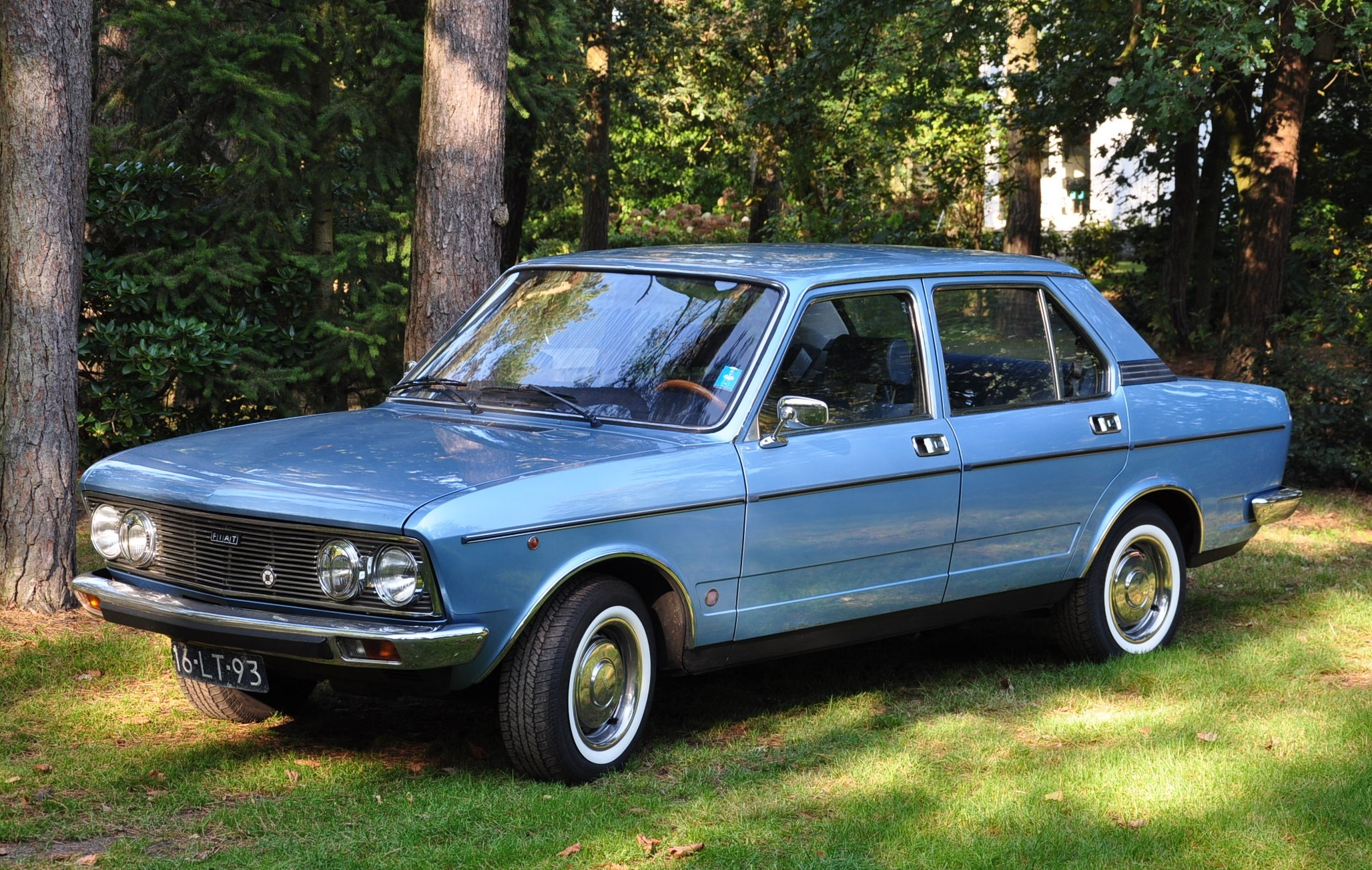
- Fiat 132 after the 1974 redesign

Overview
- Manufacturer: Fiat
- Also called: Fiat Elita (South Africa); Polski Fiat 132p (Poland)
- Production: 1972–1981
- Assembly: Italy: Turin; Chile: Rancagua; Poland: Warsaw (Polski Fiat); South Africa: Rosslyn; South Korea: Hwaseong (Kia); Yugoslavia: Zagreb (Zastava)
- Designer: Marcello Gandini

Body and chassis
- Class: Large family car (D)
- Body style: 4-door saloon
- Layout: FR layout
- Related: SEAT 132

Powertrain
- Engine: Petrol: 1585 cc 132C.000 DOHC I4; 1592 cc 132A.000 DOHC I4; 1756 cc 132A1.000/B1.000 DOHC I4; 1995 cc 132C2.000/C3.000 DOHC I4; Diesel: 1995 cc Sofim 8144.65 I4; 2445 cc Sofim 8144.61 I4
- Transmission: 4 and 5-speed manual 3-speed automatic

Dimensions
- Wheelbase: 2,557 mm (100.7 in)
- Length: 4,405 mm (173.4 in)
- Width: 1,640 mm (64.6 in)
- Height: 1,422 mm (56.0 in)
- Curb weight: 1,120 – 1,170 kg (2469-2579 lb)

Chronology
- Predecessor: Fiat 125
- Successor: Fiat Argenta

The Fiat 132 is a large family car which was produced by the Italian automobile company Fiat from 1972 to 1981. An updated version of the 132, called the Argenta, was produced from 1981 to 1985.

== Fiat 132 (1972–1974) ==
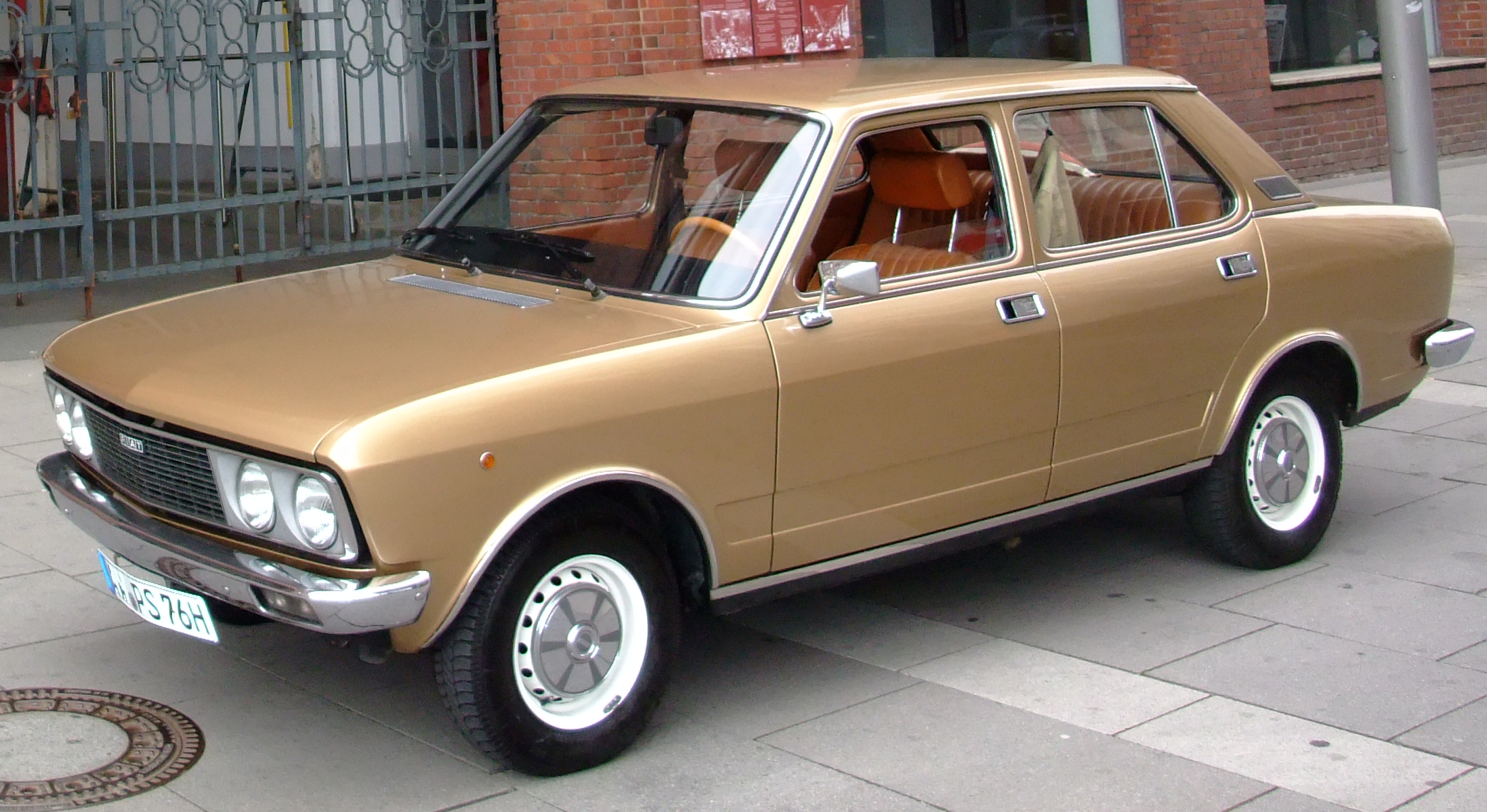
Fiat 132 (1972–1974)

The 132 was introduced as a replacement for the Fiat 125 and like it, came with Fiat Twin Cam engines as standard. However, the Fiat 132 looked more like the larger top-of-the-range Fiat 130.

Like the 125, the 132 came with a five-speed manual gearbox, optional in some markets and standard in others: this was still a relatively unusual feature in this class of car in 1977. GM "Strasbourg" automatic transmission was listed as an option.

The first series of the 132 was available in two versions: 'normal' (only 1600 engine) and 'special' (1600 or 1800 engine).

== Fiat 132 (1974–1977) ==
A major update to the front suspension was implemented for January 1974 in response to criticism of the handling and very low geared steering. Press reports of the time commend the improved handling which was also supported by the fitting of wider tires, although poor fuel consumption at high speed continued to draw adverse comment, even where the (unusual for the time) five speed transmission option was specified. At the same time, an external redesign gave the impression of a lowered waistline resulting from larger side windows. It included a new grille, new rear lights and a reshaped C-pillar which had a semblance of BMW's "Hofmeister kink" and reminded some of the BMW 5 Series, introduced two years before.

For the driver, new shock absorbers accompanied the suspension improvements. The 1600 cc engine remained unchanged but the 1800 cc engine benefited from a modified cylinder head and carburettor, resulting in a small increase in claimed output to 107 hp (80 kW), along with a usefully flattened torque curve. Interior improvements included a redesigned steering wheel along with improved heating and ventilation controls.

The second series of the 132 was available as GL (only 1600 engine) and as GLS (1600 or 1800 engine).

== Fiat 132 (1977–1981) ==
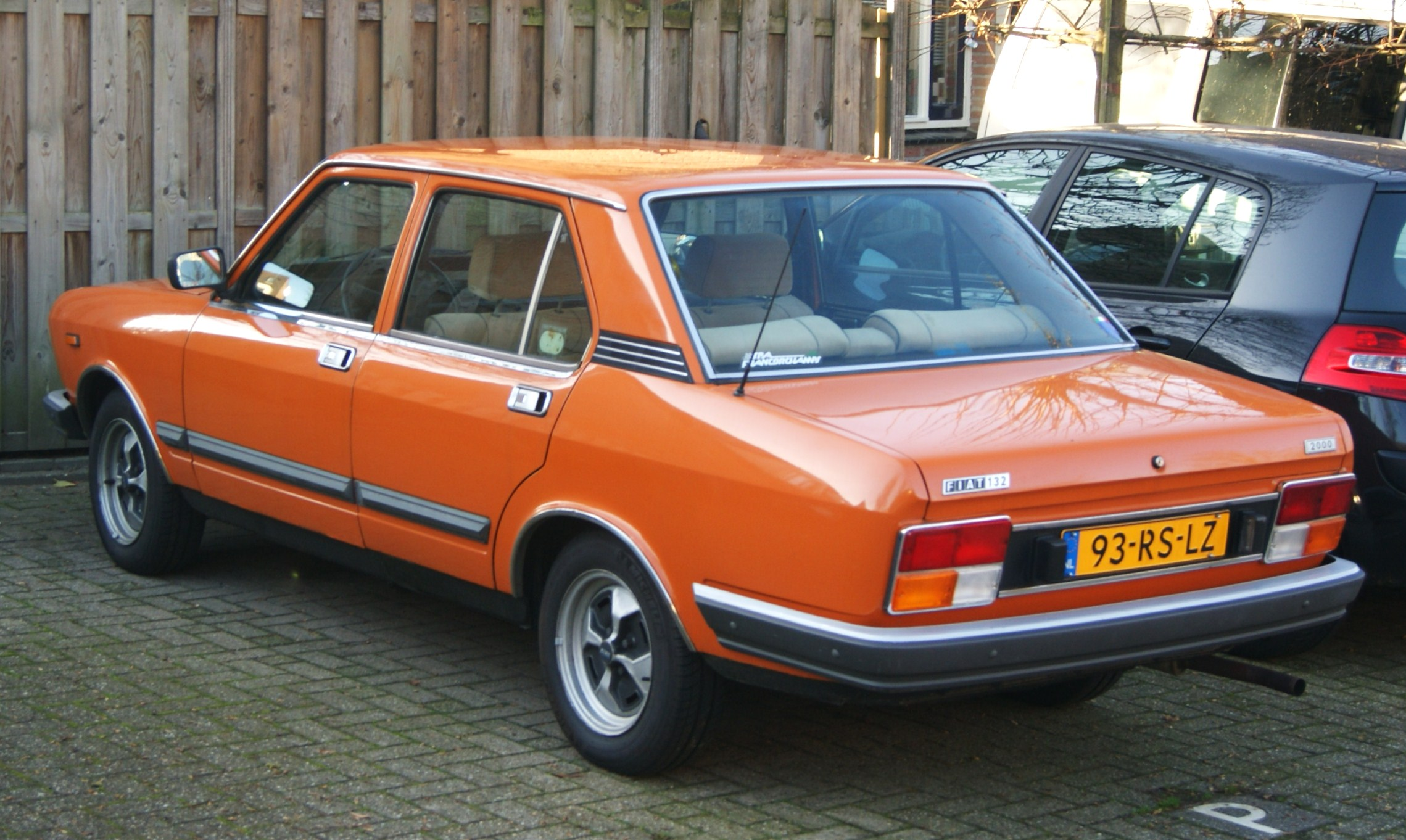
1978 Fiat 132 (rear view)

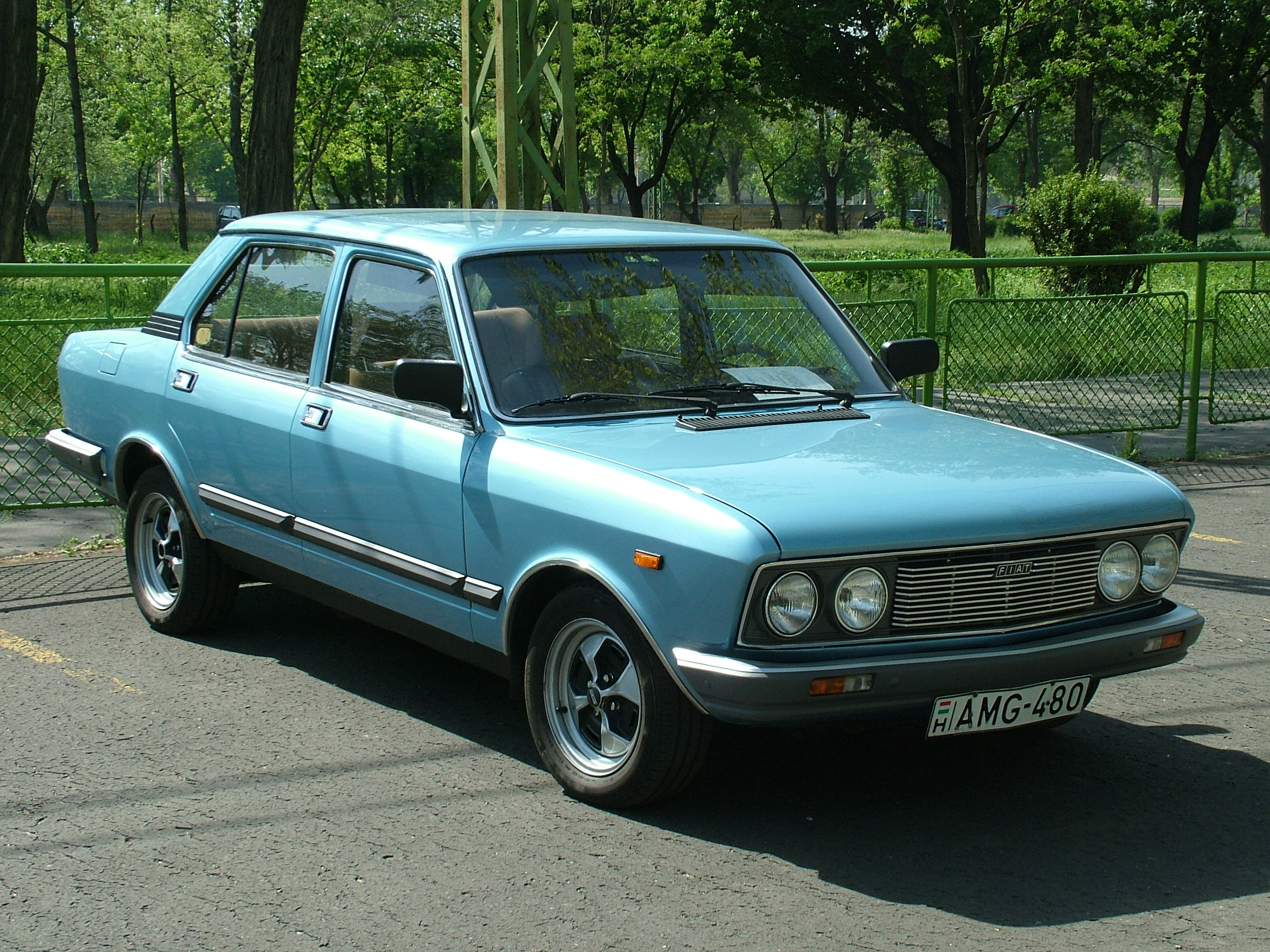
1980 Fiat 132

In April 1977, the 132 received a further facelift. New plastic "safety" bumpers were introduced to the model plus big rubber side protection strips, and the gearing of the steering was raised, supported by the addition of servo-assistance. Inside were a new dashboard, door cards and seat trims. An innovative feature of this edition were the acrylic sunvisors, which could be extracted from the headliner, both forward and sideways at the same time. At this point, with the 130 having been discontinued, the 132 became the "flagship" of the Fiat range.

The third series of the 132 was only available in one unified version, where some of the standard equipment of the 2-liter version was optional for the 1600 version. New were Sofim diesel engines (1978) and a fuel injection version of the 2-liter engine (1979).

== Engines ==
The Fiat 132 was available with the following engines:

	Petrol							Diesel	
Year	1972–1977	1977–1981	1972–1974	1974–1976	1976–1977	1977–1981	1979–1981	1978–1981	
Engine code	132A.000	132C.000	132A1.000	132B1.000		132C2.000	132C3.000	8144.65	8144.61
Displacement	1592 cc	1585 cc	1756 cc			1995 cc		1995 cc	2445 cc
Bore × stroke	80 × 79.2 mm	84 × 71.5 mm	84 × 79.2 mm			84 × 90 mm		88 × 82 mm	93 × 90 mm
Fuel system	carburetor						fuel injection	indirect injection	
Output	98 PS (72 kW; 97 hp) at 6,000 rpm	98 PS (72 kW; 97 hp) at 5,600 rpm	105 PS (77 kW; 104 hp) at 5,600 rpm	107 PS (79 kW; 106 hp) at 6,000 rpm	111 PS (82 kW; 109 hp) at 5,600 rpm	112 PS (82 kW; 110 hp) at 5,600 rpm	122 PS (90 kW; 120 hp) at 5,300 rpm	60 PS (44 kW; 59 hp) at 4,400 rpm	72 PS (53 kW; 71 hp) at 4,200 rpm
Torque	13.2 kg⋅m (129 N⋅m; 95 lb⋅ft) at 4,000 rpm	13.4 kg⋅m (131 N⋅m; 97 lb⋅ft) at 4,000 rpm	14.4 kg⋅m (141 N⋅m; 104 lb⋅ft) at 4,200 rpm	14.4 kg⋅m (141 N⋅m; 104 lb⋅ft) at 4,000 rpm	15.1 kg⋅m (148 N⋅m; 109 lb⋅ft) at 3,400 rpm	16.1 kg⋅m (158 N⋅m; 116 lb⋅ft) at 3,000 rpm	17.5 kg⋅m (172 N⋅m; 127 lb⋅ft) at 3,500 rpm	11.5 kg⋅m (113 N⋅m; 83 lb⋅ft) at 2,400 rpm	15 kg⋅m (150 N⋅m; 110 lb⋅ft) at 2,400 rpm

== Overseas assembly ==
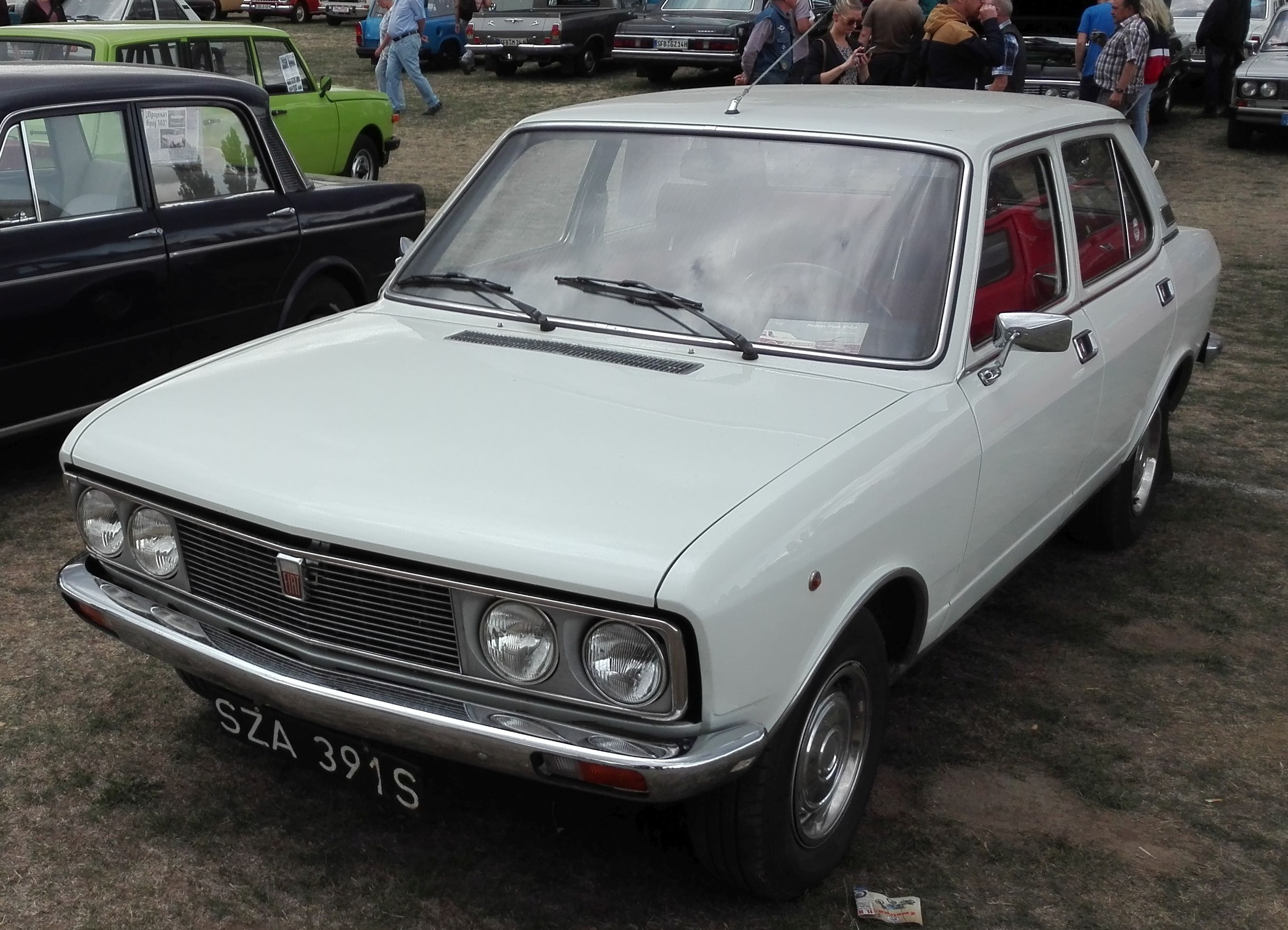
1974 Polski Fiat 132p

The 132 had limited manufacture outside Italy compared to its predecessor 125. The car was built in Spain by SEAT with a version that was sold between 1973 and 1982. It was also assembled in South Africa by Fiat's local assemblers in Rosslyn. After the 1977 update, the 132 was renamed "Elita" in South Africa, and due to a shortage of capacity at Fiat's plant it was assembled by competitors Alfa Romeo South Africa.

The 132 was also assembled in Yugoslavia by Zastava, in Zagreb. Cars arrived there practically fully completed, and there parts like wheels, battery, and also a plate which confirmed that car was assembled in Yugoslavia (under the name "Zastava 132"), were put. There weren't any differences from the Italian-built model. Assembly lasted from 1974 to 1983, and some 2,000–3,000 examples were built annually. Total 13.025 cars. It was particularly popular between directors and officials. The 132 was succeeded by Fiat Argenta in Zastava's lineup.

In Poland the 132 was offered from 1973 as the Polski Fiat 132p. The car was described as "assembled by FSO", though actually the cars were shipped from Italy almost complete. FSO only did the final assembly, fitting minor parts like wipers, batteries, seats, wheels and logos. The Polski Fiat 132p was a favourite with high state officials and security services. For internal market it was available only for hard currency in Pewex stores. Until 1981, 4461 were assembled. 270 Argentas were also assembled in this way in 1985 by FSO.

Kia built 4,759 units of the 132 from CKD kits in South Korea, from 1979.
