= Fiat Argenta =

Large family car produced by Fiat

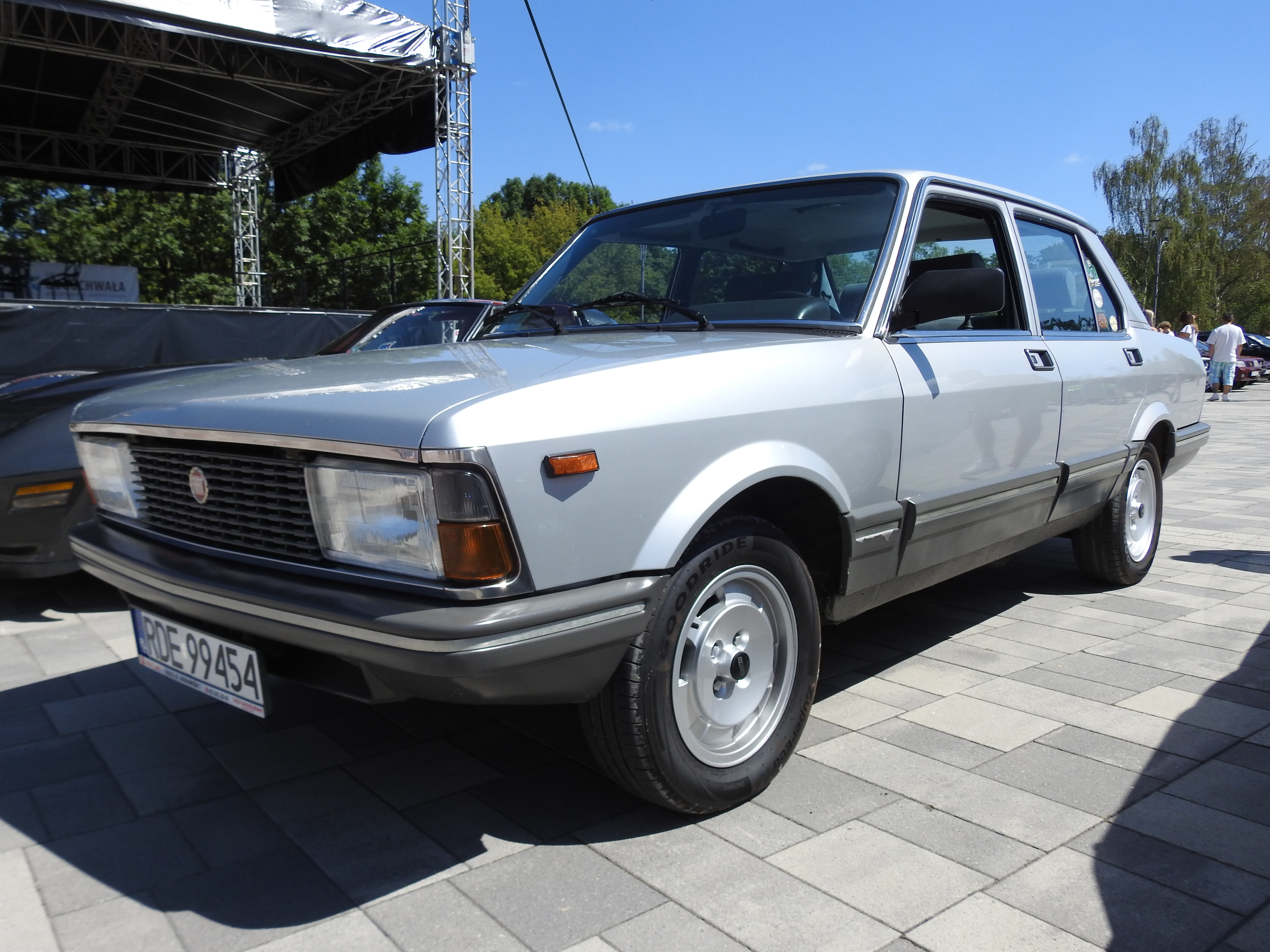
- Fiat Argenta (1981–1983)

Overview
- Manufacturer: Fiat
- Production: 1981–1985
- Assembly: Italy: Turin; Chile: Rancagua; Poland: Warsaw (FSO)

Body and chassis
- Class: Large family car (D)
- Body style: 4-door saloon
- Layout: FR layout

Powertrain
- Engine: Petrol: 1585 cc 132 D.000 I4; 1995 cc 132 D1.000 I4; 1995 cc 132 C3.000 I4; 1995 cc 132 E.000 supercharged I4; Diesel: 2445 cc 8144.61 I4; 2445 cc 8144.81 turbo I4
- Transmission: 5-speed manual 3-speed automatic

Dimensions
- Wheelbase: 2,558 mm (100.7 in); Facelift: 2,563 mm (100.9 in)
- Length: 4,449 mm (175.2 in)
- Width: 1,650 mm (65.0 in)
- Height: 1,420 mm (55.9 in)
- Curb weight: 1,170 kg (2,579 lb)

Chronology
- Predecessor: Fiat 130; Fiat 132
- Successor: Fiat Croma

The Fiat Argenta is a large family car produced by the Italian automobile company Fiat from 1981 to 1985. It was a comprehensive update of the Fiat 132 and the last mass-produced Fiat with rear-wheel drive until the 2016 124 Spider. The change to a name came about as Fiat was changing their naming strategy, changing from three-digit numbers to more meaningful names. This model was available in sedan/saloon bodystyle only.

== Argenta (1981–1983) ==
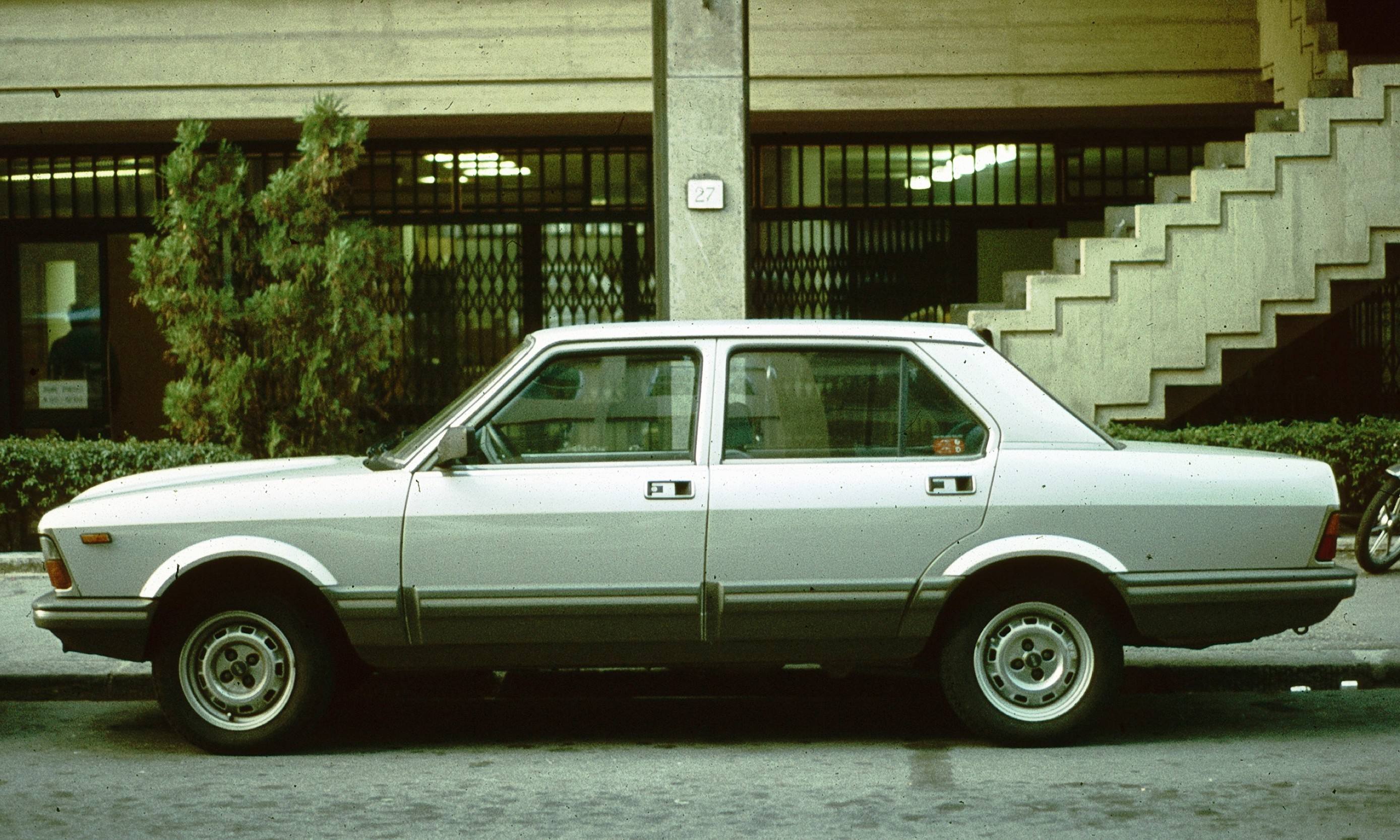
Argenta Diesel, side view (pre-facelift).

Arriving in May 1981, the Argenta was closely based on its predecessor Fiat 132. Although all body panels and windows except the doors were new only a careful observer would have noticed (also the 132 door handles were used again, but on the opposite sides, so on the Argenta they were positioned 'backwards'). The most marked change was to the front clip, with large rectangular headlamps replacing the earlier twin round units. Bigger, square rubber bumpers made the car about 7 centimetres (2.8 in) longer. The fuel tank was moved from a somewhat exposed location at the rear right and was now mounted upright behind the rear seat. This also required relocating the fuel tank filler from the fender up to the C-pillar.

Other changes included new trim, wheels, dashboard, mirrors, rectangular headlights, a shorter gear stick, and a refined suspension and brakes. Trim level was raised compared to the previous 132 and the contemporary 131 Mirafiori, with electric windows and door locking as well as power steering. Much was also made of the new Check Panel, a diagnostic panel with a diagram of the car in which LED's would light up if any safety-related function needed attention. Some markets had a large manually-sliding steel sunroof, others had the option of air conditioning.

The engines were largely taken over from the 132. All had a 5-speed manual transmission, with an optional automatic for the 1600, 2000 and 2000 i.e. The Argenta 2000 was the sole engine choice available in the United Kingdom at the time of introduction. From spring 1982, Marelli Digiplex electronic ignition was fitted to the 2000 i.e.

== Facelift (1983–1985) ==
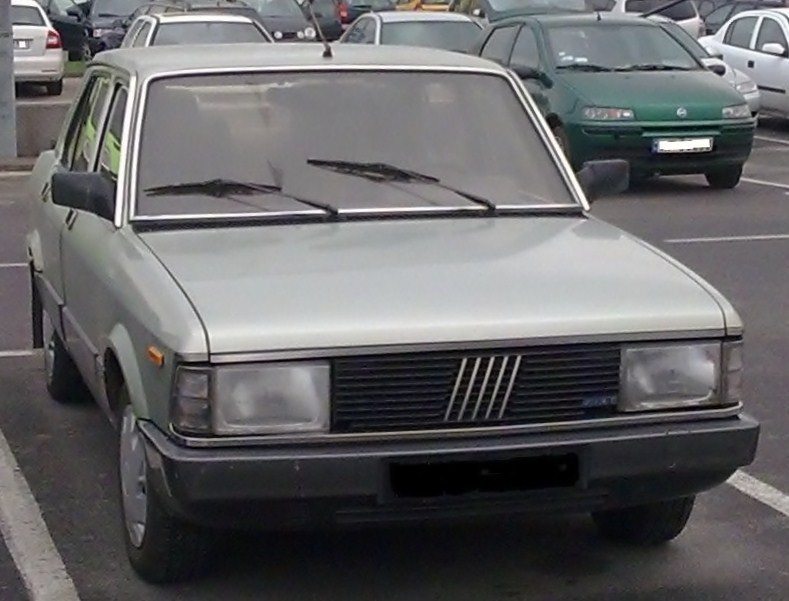
Fiat Argenta 120 i.e. showing new facelift grille

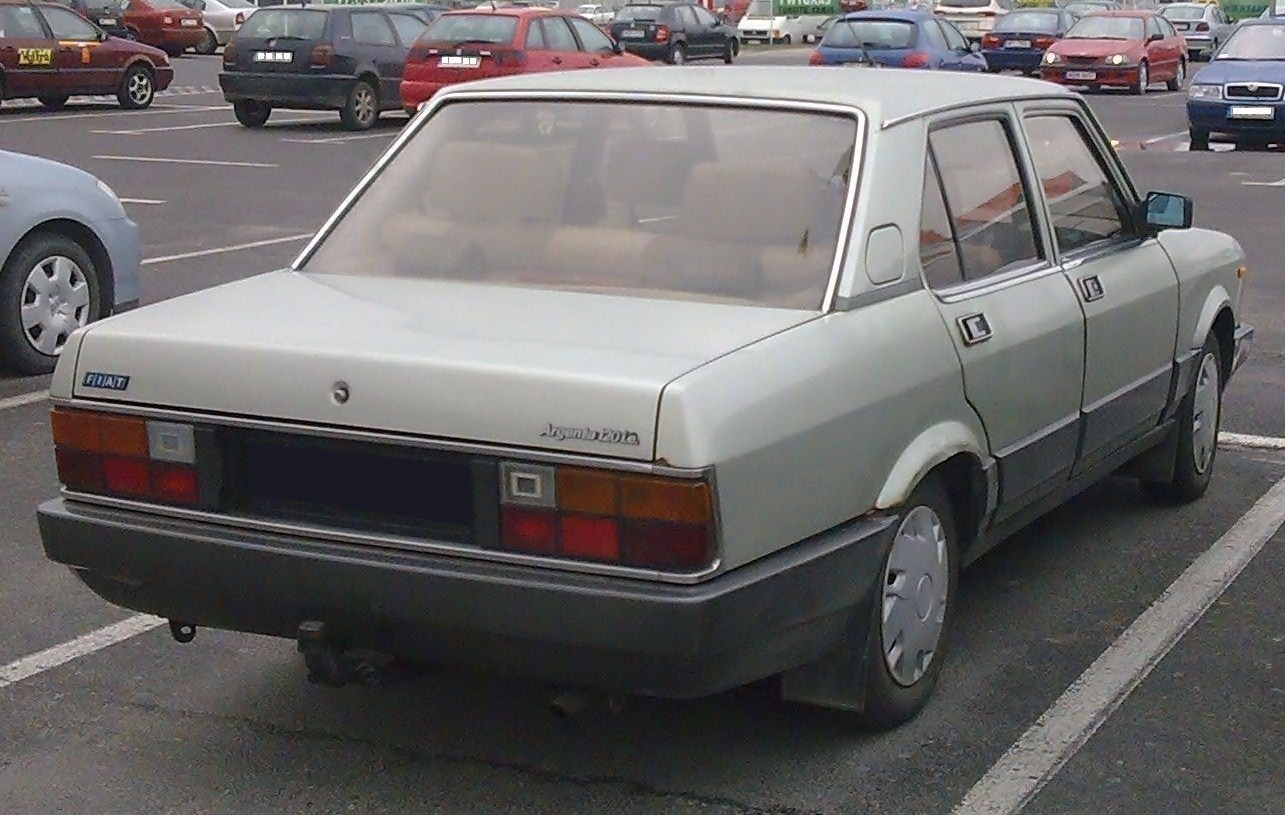
Facelift Argenta 120 i.e., rear

In June 1983, the Argenta was facelifted. The grille was renewed with the then corporate five-bar grille, new front end, slimmer new bumpers, and with an anti-roll-bar mounted on the rear axle. The front axle was widened by 60 mm (2.4 in), the wheelbase grew 5 mm, and new wheels with flat wheel trims and chrome embellishers were used. Some minor changes were made inside the car, most notably to the seat/door/roof lining trim and a new steering wheel. The radio antenna moved from inside the windscreen to the roof. The carburetted two-liter model (Argenta 110) was only sold outside of Italy and was added to the lineup in March 1984.

The Argenta had also two new engines: Fiat's first turbodiesel, a 2.45 litre four producing 90 PS (66 kW) arrived as part of the facelift. In March 1984 the Argenta VX arrived, with a supercharged 2.0-liter engine with 135 PS (99 kW) shared with the Lancia Volumex models. Both these models had rear disc brakes and a 70-litre fuel tank instead of the usual 60 litres. The VX badge was only used in export; the Italian-market model was called the SX and went on sale in June 1984.

The car remained in production until 1985 when it was replaced by the Croma. A small number of Argentas (270 examples) were also built in Poland by FSO in 1985, after Italian production had ended. FSO had also assembled the Fiat 132 earlier.

== Engines ==
The Argenta came with a choice of petrol and diesel engines. The diesel option has a noticeable hump on the bonnet to clear the larger engine. Not all engines were available in all of the Argenta's markets.

	Petrol				Diesel	
Type name before/after facelift	1600/ 100	2000/ 110	2000 i.e. or Injection/ 120 i.e.	n/a VX (or SX)	Diesel; Diesel	n/a Turbo D
Engine code	132 D.000	132 D1.000	132 C3.000	132 E.000	8144.61	8144.81
Displacement	1585 cc	1995 cc			2445 cc	
Bore × stroke	84 × 71.5 mm	84 × 90 mm			93 × 90 mm	
Fuel system	carburetor		fuel injection	carburetor + Roots compressor	indirect injection	indirect injection + turbo compressor
Output	98 PS (72 kW; 97 hp) at 6,000 rpm	113 PS (83 kW; 111 hp) at 5,600 rpm	122 PS (90 kW; 120 hp) at 5,300 rpm	135 PS (99 kW; 133 hp) at 5,500 rpm	72 PS (53 kW; 71 hp) at 4,200 rpm	90 PS (66 kW; 89 hp) at 4,100 rpm
Torque	13.4 kg⋅m (131 N⋅m; 97 lb⋅ft) at 4,000 rpm after f/l: 13.6 kg⋅m (133 N⋅m; 98 lb⋅ft) at 3,800 rpm	17 kg⋅m (170 N⋅m; 120 lb⋅ft) at 3,700 rpm after f/l: 17.1 kg⋅m (168 N⋅m; 124 lb⋅ft) at 3,000 rpm	17.5 kg⋅m (172 N⋅m; 127 lb⋅ft) at 3,500 rpm	21 kg⋅m (210 N⋅m; 150 lb⋅ft) at 3,000 rpm	15 kg⋅m (150 N⋅m; 110 lb⋅ft) at 2,400 rpm	20 kg⋅m (200 N⋅m; 140 lb⋅ft) at 2,400 rpm
Top speed (with manual gearbox)	165 km/h (103 mph)	170 km/h (110 mph)	175 km/h (109 mph)	185 km/h (115 mph)	150 km/h (93 mph)	160 km/h (99 mph)

== Trivia ==
In February 1984, Fiat supplied 400 Argentas to the Chinese authorities, intended for use by government functionaries. All were painted dark blue and fitted with the 2-litre engine. They were shipped to the port of Tianjin. At the time, this was the largest number of cars ever in one sales agreement between a Western country and China. The press release stated they were equipped with every possible feature to highlight their robustness and comfort, even on very bumpy roads.
