= Lancia Chivasso plant =

Car factory owned by Lancia

The Lancia Chivasso Plant was the second manufacturing plant of Italian automobile company Lancia, following the Lancia Borgo San Paolo Plant. The plant manufactured Lancia models such as the Lancia Flaminia, Lancia Beta, Lancia Delta, Lancia Prisma and others.

== History ==
On December 20, 1959, the Minister of Foreign Affairs Giuseppe Pella laid the foundation stone of the new large 1,120,000 m^{2} factory, for the Italian car brand Lancia, which at that time was under the control of the family Pesenti. In 1972 the number of workers in the Chivasso increased to 5,000.

The plant started production of Lancia cars, which were built on a Fiat platform. After 1993, the plant began production of Fiat models such as Fiat Panda Van and Fiat Barchetta under the auspices of Maggiora, until its bankruptcy in the early 2000s. Since then, the plant has been converted into a business park.

== List of cars produced ==
- 1963–1969 Lancia Flaminia
- 1963–1970 Lancia Flavia
- 1963–1976 Lancia Fulvia
- 1972–1984 Lancia Beta
- 1976–1984 Lancia Gamma
- 1979–1994 Lancia Delta
- 1980–1984 Lancia Trevi
- 1982–1989 Lancia Prisma
- 1989–1993 Lancia Dedra
- 1995–2002 Fiat Barchetta
- 1997–2002 Fiat Panda Van
- 1997–2001 Lancia K Coupé
