= Lancia Prisma =

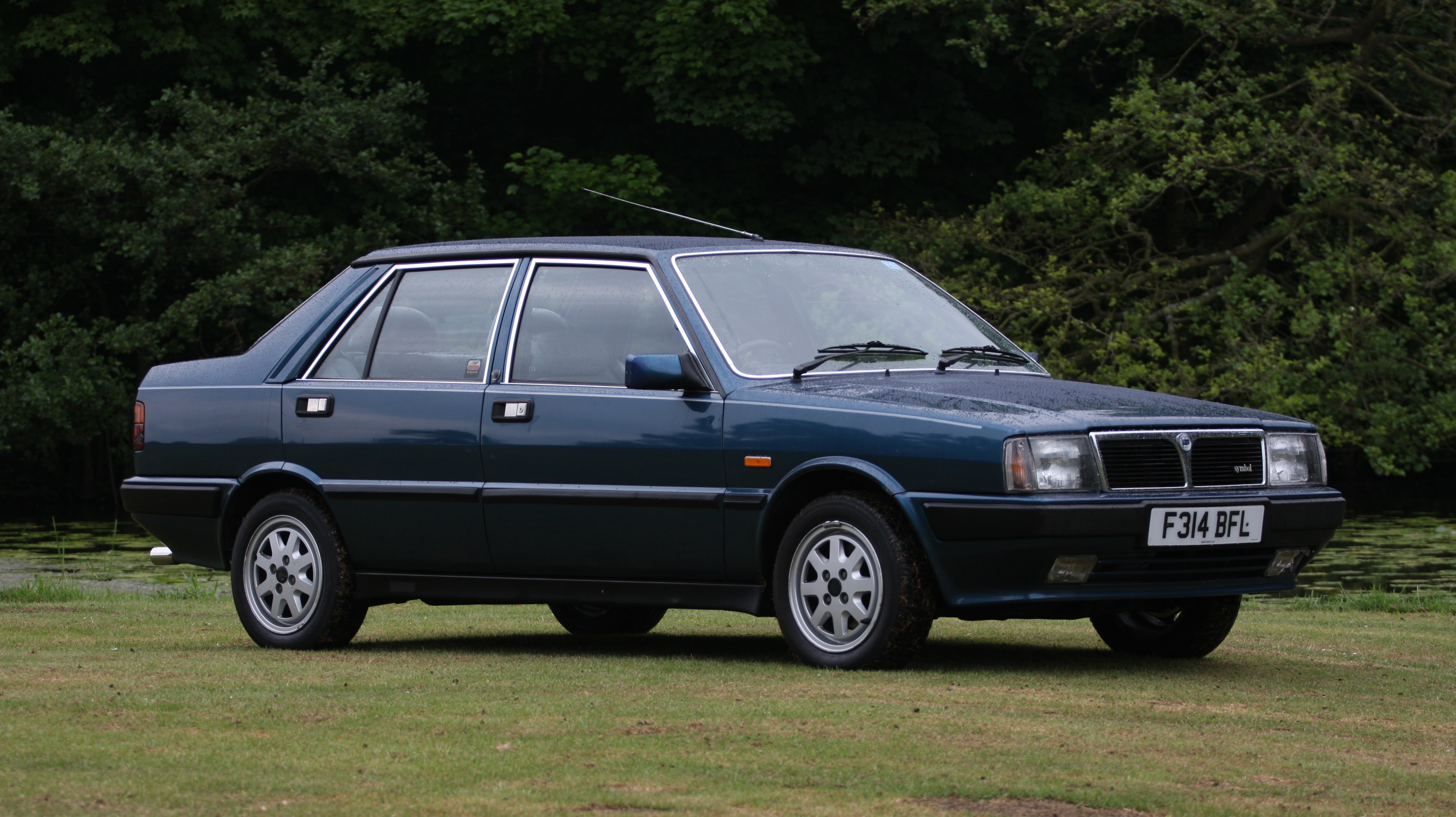

Overview
- Manufacturer: Lancia
- Production: 1982–1989
- Assembly: Italy: Chivasso, Piedmont (Chivasso plant)
- Designer: Giorgetto Giugiaro at Italdesign

Body and chassis
- Class: Small family car (C)
- Body style: 4-door saloon
- Layout: Front-engine, front-wheel-drive Front-engine, four-wheel-drive
- Related: Lancia Delta

Powertrain
- Engine: 1.3 L I4; 1.5 L I4; 1.6 L I4; 2.0 L I4; 1.9 L diesel I4; 1.9 L turbodiesel I4
- Transmission: 5-speed manual; 3-speed automatic

Dimensions
- Wheelbase: 2,475 mm (97.4 in)
- Length: 4,180 mm (164.6 in)
- Width: 1,620 mm (63.8 in)
- Height: 1,385 mm (54.5 in)
- Kerb weight: 950–1,050 kg (2,094.4–2,314.9 lb)

Chronology
- Predecessor: Lancia Fulvia; Lancia Beta; Lancia Trevi
- Successor: Lancia Dedra

The Lancia Prisma (Tipo 831) is a small family car built by Italian car manufacturer Lancia between 1983 and 1989. It was a saloon version of the first generation Lancia Delta hatchback, and like the Delta it was designed by Giorgetto Giugiaro. Like the Delta it was also available as a 4x4 integrale version, although with a non-turbocharged engine and an air-locking rear differential.

== Layout ==
The Lancia Prisma was a four-door, five-seat saloon with steel unibody construction, front-transverse mounted engines in block with the transaxle and all-independent suspension. Suspension consisted of MacPherson struts with offset telescopic dampers and coil springs, and anti-roll bars on both axles. The front struts were located by a stamped steel control arm and one radius rod; the rear by two parallel transverse links (the rearmost one adjustable for toe regulation) attached to a crossmember and one trailing link.

== History ==
The task of transforming the Delta into a saloon car was given to its original designer Giorgetto Giugiaro, who worked on the car between 1979 and 1980. The two cars share platform (including the 2475 mm wheelbase), drivetrains, doors and windscreen. The Prisma became the most popular Lancia nearly immediately; with a daily production of 250 a cumulative production of 100,000 was reached in 1984.

=== First series (1982–1986) ===
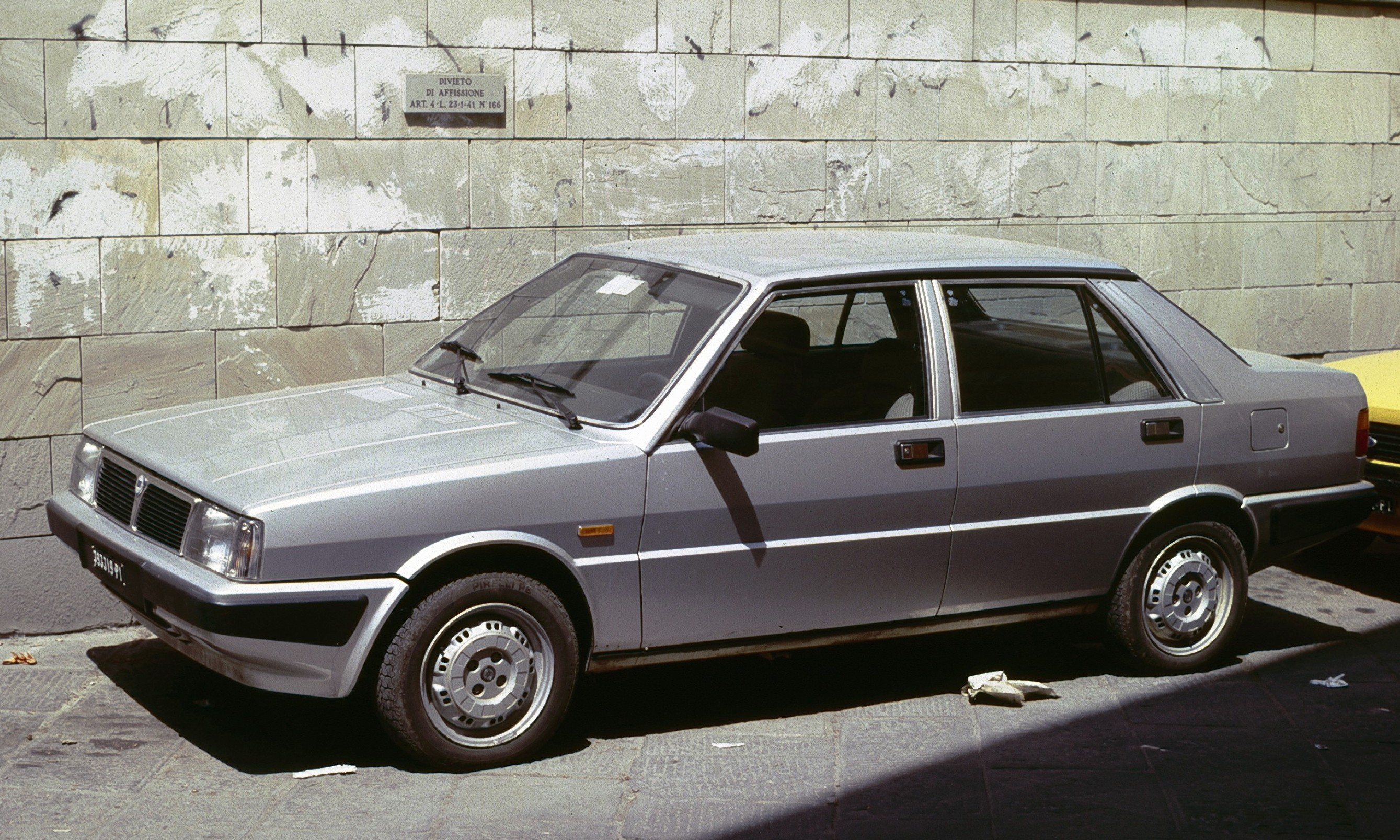
An early Lancia Prisma

The Prisma was launched in late December 1982 and went on sale in Italy in early January 1983, while its European première was held at that year Geneva Motor Show. The initial range was composed of five models, equivalent to that the freshly revised 1982 Delta. Prisma 1300 was powered by a 1301 cc 78 PS engine mated to a 5-speed gearbox; a 1498 cc 85 PS engine was available with the same gearbox on Prisma 1500, or with Lancia's own Verrone-built 3-speed automatic transmission on the Prisma 1500 automatica. At the top of the range there was Prisma 1600, mounting the 1585 cc 105 PS twin-cam engine from the Delta 1600 GT, with Marelli Digiplex ignition. Similarly to the Delta GT, the Prisma 1600 was also equipped with four disc brakes, a 5-speed gearbox with dedicated ratios and lower profile tyres on wider wheels; it also boasted the amplest standard equipment, Zegna-designed chequerboard wool cloth upholstery and some exclusive options, such as air conditioning.

June 1984 marked the introduction of the Lancia Prisma diesel, the marque's first modern diesel-engined passenger car. The diesel was imperative, as more than a third of Italian sales in the Prisma's class were of diesel-powered cars. Its naturally aspirated 1929 cc SOHC four-cylinder had an iron block, aluminium head and indirect injection; it put out 65 PS. The engine had been developed by Fiat, and was also installed in the Fiat Regata DS—although the Fiat lacked some of Lancia's NVH-improving solutions. The diesel engine was light, only weighing 11 kg (24 lb) more than the 1.6-liter petrol unit. All Diesel Prismas sported a sightly domed hood, needed to clear the taller engine. Some updates were introduced with the diesel, including optional hydraulic power steering, redesigned seats, new striped cloth upholstery and a four-spoke steering wheel.

About a year later, in May 1985, the Prisma turbo diesel was added to the range. The 1.9-litre engine from the Prisma diesel received a KKK turbocharger with wastegate valve, an intercooler and an oil cooler; its gearbox was the same ZF 5-speed unit used on the Delta HF turbo. Power was 80 PS and torque 172 N⋅m (17.5 kg⋅m). The turbo diesel Prisma adopted disk brakes, wheels and tyres from the top-of-the-range 1600 as well as similarly rich equipment, and added standard power steering.

=== Second series (1986–1989) ===
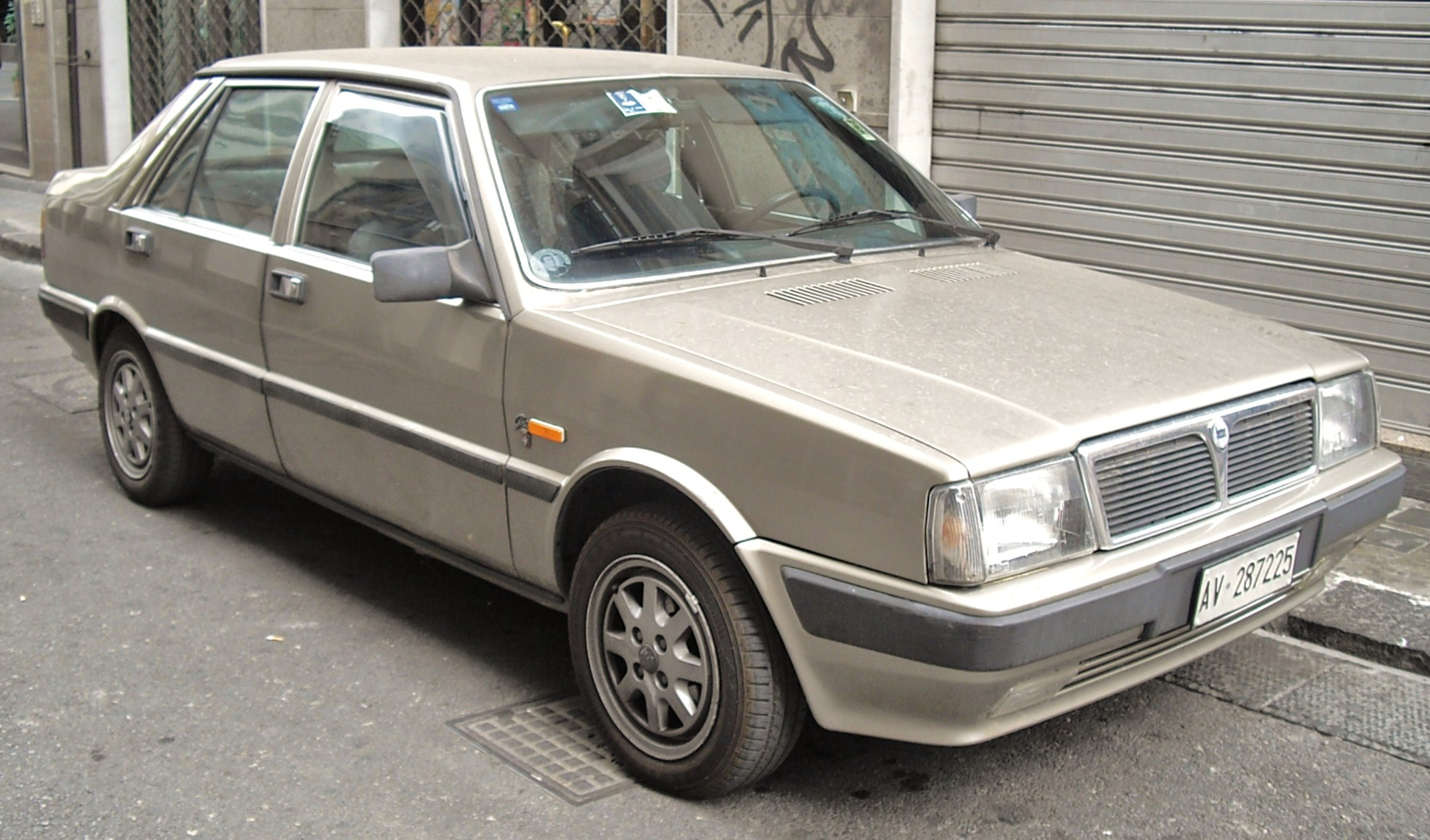
Second series Lancia Prisma

A major mid-cycle refresh débuted at the April 1986 Turin Motor Show. Changes were made to the exterior and interior of the car. Outside there were more modern, enveloping bumpers—the front one with provisions for integrated fog lights; the redesigned grille and bonnet bore a family resemblance to the flagship Thema. Also new were the ventilation grille on the C-pillar and full-wheel hubcaps. Inside new seats, new instrumentation and air conditioning system. The 1986 range included seven models, two of them all-new: 1.3, 1.5, 1.5 Automatica, 1.6, 1.6 i.e., 4WD, diesel and turbo ds. 1.3 and 1.5 models had revised intake and exhaust system, fuel cut-off, a new carburettor and breakerless ignition.

The diesel versions had also received some minor engine updates, and the turbo diesel had been renamed turbo ds.

The new Prisma 1.6 i.e. used a version of the 1585 cc twin-cam engine equipped with Weber-Marelli IAW integrated electronic ignition and fuel injection system, developing 108 PS.

In comparison to the carburetted Prisma 1600—which remained on sale as Prisma 1.6—further changes had been made: the cylinder head had been rotated 180°, bringing the exhaust side to the front for better cooling, and the whole engine was canted forward 18° to lower its centre of gravity. The new Prisma 1.6 i.e. could easily reach over 200 km/h.

The 90 PS 1.6 i.e. use same Twin-Cam engine with SPI intake and catalytic converter.

The other new arrival was the Prisma 4WD, featuring a two-litre fuel injected engine and Lancia's three differential permanent four wheel drive. Derived from the flagship Thema, the 1995 cc, twin-cam 8-valve engine featured two counter rotating balance shafts and IAW fuel injection; it developed 115 PS (85 kW) and 163 N⋅m (120 lbf⋅ft). The 4WD package was completed by four disk brakes from the 1.6, power steering and wide, low profile 185/60 tyres on 14-inch 8-spoke alloy wheels. Minor details set the 4WD apart from other Prismas: outside a "4WD" script on the right half of the grille and on the new side skirts, inside it sported the instrument panel from the Delta HF 4WD with six round gauges, yellow scales and hands.

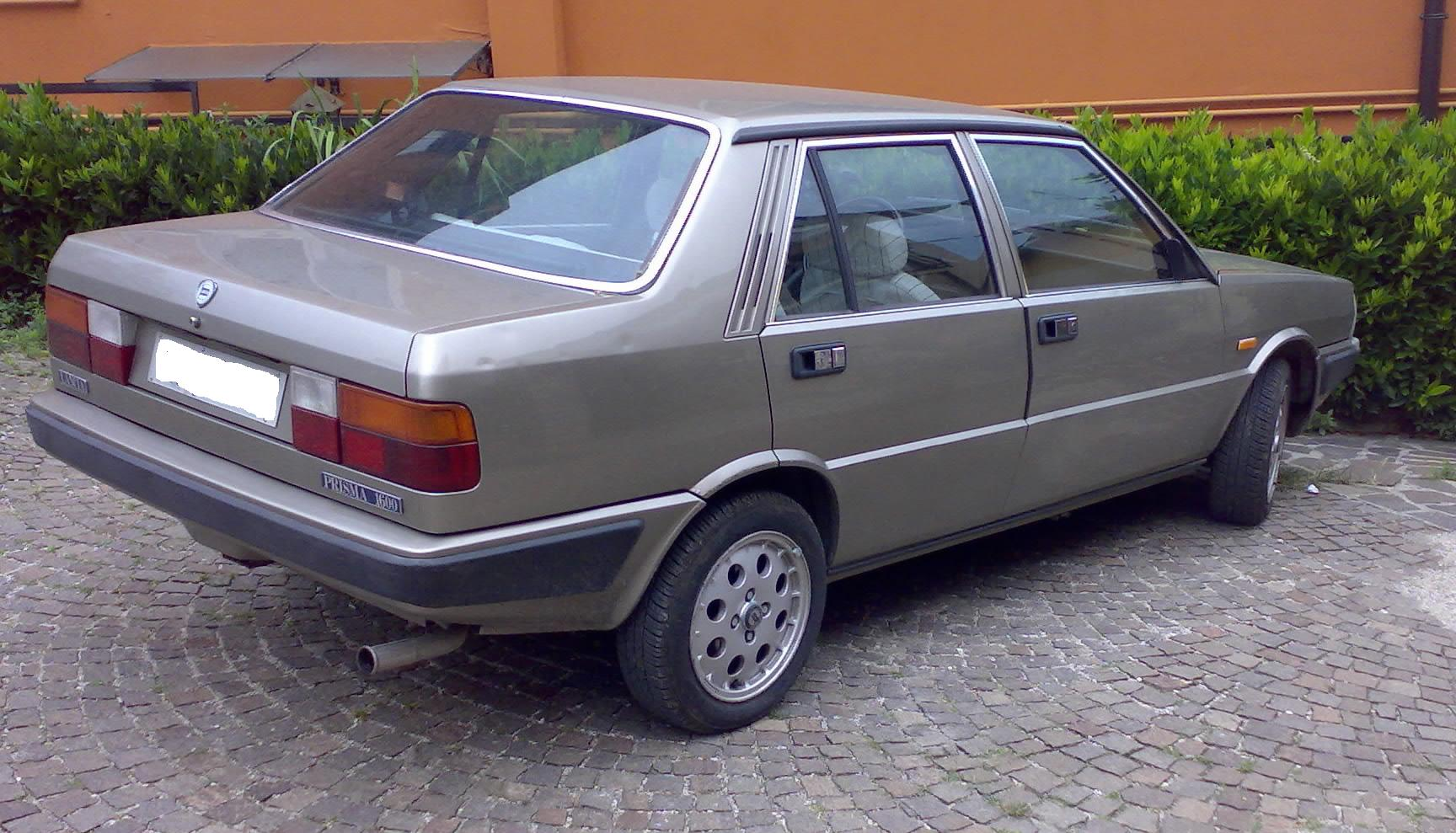
Rear view

In June 1987 the 4WD was updated and rechristened Prisma integrale; it came with optional two-tone paintwork in a choice of three tone on tone combinations, a matching Alcantara interior, and a drop in price from the 4WD — at least in the home market where prices were cut by 10 percent.

The last update for the Prisma was the introduction of the eighth model in the range, the upmarket Prisma 1.5 LX, in March 1988. The LX trim added metallic paint, checked cloth interior with beige carpeting and convenience equipment. LX trim is available for the 1600 and 1.6 i.e. on different market in EU (Germany, Switzerland, France etc) with rear electric windows, headlight wiper, headlight beam adjuster.

Total production number of the Prisma was 386,697 cars. The successor of the Prisma, the Lancia Dedra, was unveiled in early 1989, with sales commencing in May; production of the Prisma ended in 1989.

== Four-wheel-drive system ==
Lancia's permanent four-wheel-drive system was based on three differentials. An epicyclic gear train served as centre differential, splitting the torque between the front and rear axle according to a fixed predetermined ratio—56% front/44% rear on the Prisma 4WD. The ring gear of the epicyclic differential meshed with the gearbox output shaft, its sun gear transmitted torque the front open differential, and its planet carrier, through a pair of bevel gears and a three-piece drive shaft, to the rear differential. A Ferguson coupling controlled the centre differential, preventing excessive relative slippage of the two axles. The epicyclic differential, the Ferguson coupling and the front differential were mounted coaxially in a single transverse unit just behind the engine. In place of the complex Torsen rear differential of the Delta HF 4WD, the Prisma 4WD had a simpler "open" type one, with differential lock—useful at low speeds in low grip conditions—controlled by the driver via a switch on the dashboard. This difference reflected the different goals of the two systems and the destination of the two vehicles: the Delta HF was designed for sport driving, the Prisma for all-conditions safe driving.

== Engines ==
As on the Delta, the SOHC engines were derived from the Fiat Ritmo, revised by Lancia engineers with a Weber twin-choke carburettor, a new inlet manifold, exhaust system and ignition. On Fiat engines Lancia make their own aluminium heads and fuel injection systems, only some parts of Fiat can be used for restoration of Lancia i.e. engines.

Model	Production period	Displacement	Valvetrain Fuel & induction syst.	Peak power	Peak torque	Accel. 0–100 km/h (0-62 mph)	Top speed
Petrol engines
1300	1982–1986	1,301 cc (79.4 cu in)	SOHC 8v, twin-choke carburetor	78 PS (57 kW; 77 hp) at 5800 rpm	105 N⋅m (77 lbf⋅ft) at 3400 rpm	14.3 s	160 km/h (99 mph)
1.3	1986–1989	1,301 cc (79.4 cu in)	SOHC 8v, twin-choke carburetor	75 PS (55 kW; 74 hp) at 5800 rpm	104 N⋅m (77 lbf⋅ft) at 3400 rpm	—	—
1.3	1986–1989	1,301 cc (79.4 cu in)	SOHC 8v, twin-choke carburetor	78 PS (57 kW; 77 hp) at 5800 rpm	105 N⋅m (77 lbf⋅ft) at 3400 rpm	14.0 s	163 km/h (101 mph)
1500	1982–1986	1,498 cc (91.4 cu in)	SOHC 8v, twin-choke carburetor	85 PS (63 kW; 84 hp) at 5800 rpm	126 N⋅m (93 lbf⋅ft) at 3500 rpm	12.0 s	165 km/h (103 mph)
1500 aut.	1982–1986	1,498 cc (91.4 cu in)	SOHC 8v, twin-choke carburetor	85 PS (63 kW; 84 hp) at 5800 rpm	126 N⋅m (93 lbf⋅ft) at 3500 rpm	14.3 s	160 km/h (99 mph)
1.5	1986–1989	1,498 cc (91.4 cu in)	SOHC 8v, twin-choke carburetor	75 PS (55 kW; 74 hp) at 5600 rpm	118 N⋅m (87 lbf⋅ft) at 3000 rpm	—	—
1.5	1986–1989	1,498 cc (91.4 cu in)	SOHC 8v, twin-choke carburetor	80 PS (59 kW; 79 hp) at 5600 rpm	123 N⋅m (91 lbf⋅ft) at 3200 rpm	12.1 s	166 km/h (103 mph)
1.5 aut.	1986–1989	1,498 cc (91.4 cu in)	SOHC 8v, twin-choke carburetor	80 PS (59 kW; 79 hp) at 5600 rpm	123 N⋅m (91 lbf⋅ft) at 3200 rpm	14.3 s	160 km/h (99 mph)
1600	1982–1986	1,585 cc (96.7 cu in)	DOHC 8v, twin-choke carburetor	105 PS (77 kW; 104 hp) at 5800 rpm	135 N⋅m (100 lbf⋅ft) at 3500 rpm	10.2 s	178 km/h (111 mph)
1.6	1986–1989	1,585 cc (96.7 cu in)	DOHC 8v, twin-choke carburetor	100 PS (74 kW; 99 hp) at 5900 rpm	126 N⋅m (93 lbf⋅ft) at 5000 rpm	10.2 s	178 km/h (111 mph)
1.6 i.e.	1986–1989	1,585 cc (96.7 cu in)	DOHC 8v, SPI	90 PS (66 kW; 89 hp) at 6250 rpm	124 N⋅m (91 lbf⋅ft) at 4250 rpm	—	—
1.6 i.e.	1986–1989	1,585 cc (96.7 cu in)	DOHC 8v, Weber Marelli IAW MPI	108 PS (79 kW; 107 hp) at 5900 rpm	135 N⋅m (100 lbf⋅ft) at 3500 rpm	9.5 s	185 km/h (115 mph)
4WD	1986–1987	1,995 cc (121.7 cu in)	DOHC 8v, 2 BS, IAW MPI	115 PS (85 kW; 113 hp) at 5400 rpm	163 N⋅m (120 lbf⋅ft) at 3250 rpm	10.5 s	184 km/h (114 mph)
integrale	1987–1989	1,995 cc (121.7 cu in)	DOHC 8v, 2 BS, IAW MPI	115 PS (85 kW; 113 hp) at 5400 rpm	163 N⋅m (120 lbf⋅ft) at 3250 rpm	10.5 s	184 km/h (114 mph)
Diesel engines
diesel	1984–1989	1,929 cc (117.7 cu in)	SOHC 8v, injection pump	65 PS (48 kW; 64 hp) at 4600 rpm	119 N⋅m (88 lbf⋅ft) at 2000 rpm	16.0 s	158 km/h (98 mph)
turbo diesel	1984–1986	1,929 cc (117.7 cu in)	SOHC 8v, injection pump, KKK turbo, intercooler	80 PS (59 kW; 79 hp) at 4200 rpm	172 N⋅m (127 lbf⋅ft) at 2400 rpm	12.9 s	170 km/h (106 mph)
turbo ds	1986–1989	1,929 cc (117.7 cu in)	SOHC 8v, injection pump, KKK turbo, intercooler	80 PS (59 kW; 79 hp) at 4200 rpm	172 N⋅m (127 lbf⋅ft) at 2400 rpm	12.9 s	170 km/h (106 mph)
