= Lancia Trevi =

Lancia Beta Trevi Lancia Trevi
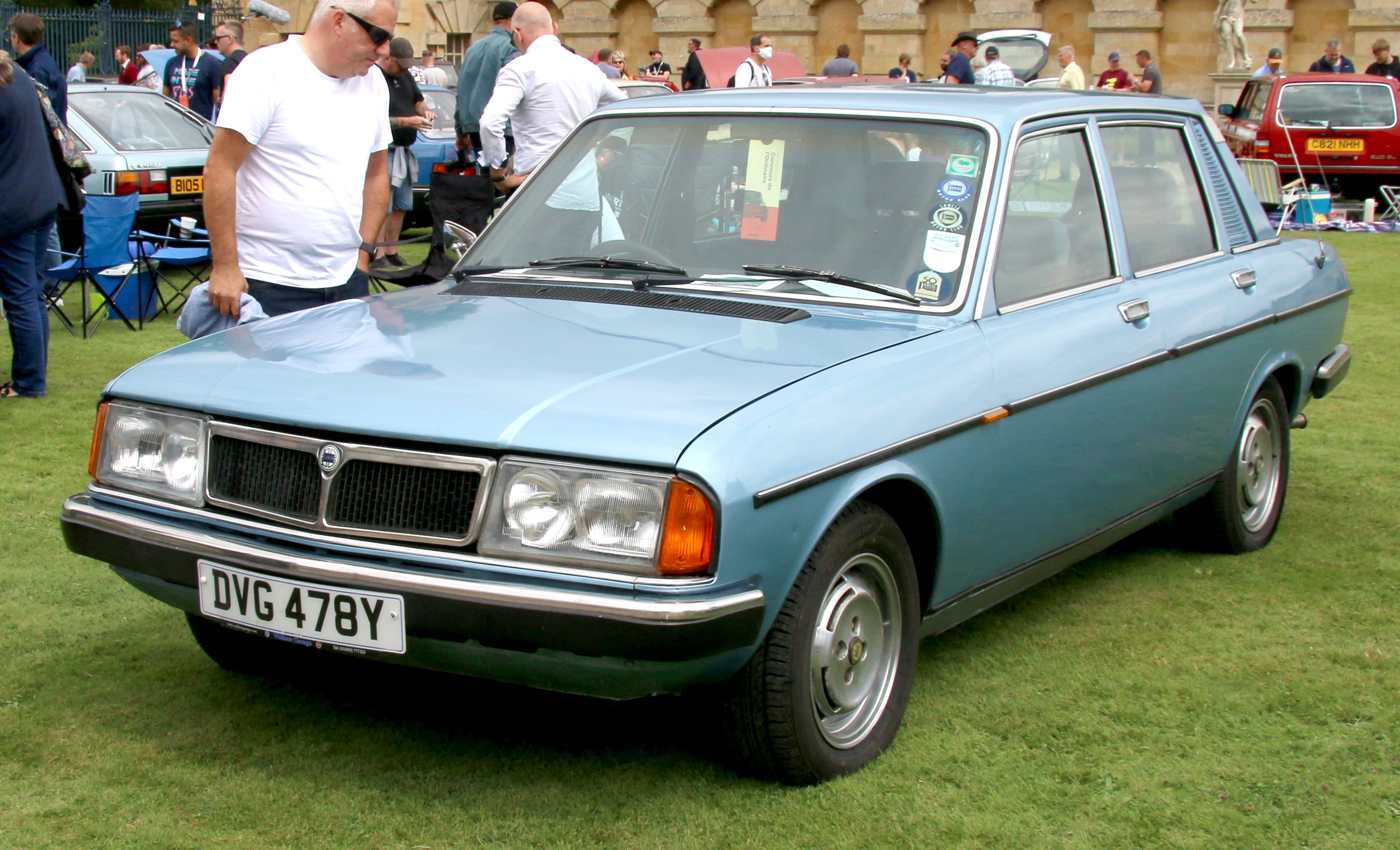
- 1982 Lancia Trevi

Overview
- Manufacturer: Lancia
- Production: 1980–1984; Lancia Beta Trevi: 1980–1983; Lancia Trevi: 1983–1984; 40,628 produced
- Assembly: Italy: Chivasso, Piedmont (Chivasso plant)
- Designer: Centro Stile Lancia; Mario Bellini (interiors)

Body and chassis
- Class: Entry-level luxury car (D)
- Body style: 4-door notchback saloon
- Layout: Transverse Front-engine, front-wheel-drive
- Related: Lancia Beta

Powertrain
- Engine: 1.6 L Fiat 132A9.000 DOHC 8v I4 (petrol); 2.0 L Fiat 828B1.000 DOHC 8v I4 (petrol); 2.0 L Fiat 828B4.000 DOHC 8v I4 (petrol; i.e.); 2.0 L Fiat 828B7.000 DOHC 8v Compressor Volumex I4 (petrol; VX)
- Transmission: 5-speed manual or 3-speed automatic

Dimensions
- Length: 4,320 mm (170 in)
- Width: 1,710 mm (67 in)
- Height: 1,400 mm (55 in)
- Curb weight: 1,165 kg (2,568 lb)

Chronology
- Predecessor: Lancia Fulvia
- Successor: Lancia Prisma

The Lancia Trevi (Type 828), initially marketed as the Lancia Beta Trevi, is a saloon car that was produced between 1980 and 1984. It has transversely mounted in-line four-cylinder engines driving the front wheels. Its engines have twin overhead camshafts and electronic ignition. The clutch is a single dry plate with diaphragm and a five-speed gearbox was standard. The suspension consists of MacPherson struts all round with coil springs and anti-roll bar. The wheels are fitted with 185/65 14 inch tyres (Pirelli P6). Steering is rack and pinion. The manufacturer's estimated fuel consumption is 29.4 mpg (9,6l/100 km) at 75 mph for the 1600 manual and 28 mpg (10,1l/100 km) at 75 mph for the 2000 manual. The 2000 fitted with an automatic transmission had an official fuel consumption of 25.4 mpg (11,1l/100 km) at 75 mph.

The Lancia Beta Trevi was presented at the Turin Auto Show in May 1980. It was presented to the UK market at the Birmingham Motor Show of November 1980. Much of the car was derived from the Lancia Beta. The most powerful version of the Trevi was introduced in 1982 - this Volumex (VX) version had a supercharger. The name stems from the Italian "Tre Volumi" (three-box).

== History ==
Developed from the Lancia Beta, the Trevi (or Beta Trevi as it was called until 1983) was introduced in 1980. The chief engineer for the Beta was Sergio Camuffo who was also responsible for the original Beta and the Gamma and numerous other models. The Beta, which was fitted with the same interior as the Trevi, was sold for two years alongside the Trevi (and sold as the Beta Berlina) Sales literature from Lancia emphasised that the car was both luxurious and sporting in nature. Lancia's intention was that the restyled Beta would help to re-establish Lancia's credibility after the debacle of the rusting Betas: "Lancia's position took an unreasonably big knock as a result of the revelation that they were buying back cars with corroded sub-frame mounting points...a new Lancia today - thanks to the over-compensation that was necessary to make their point - promises to be as rust resistant as any of its rivals" wrote UK's Autocar in 1981. The review continued to say the Trevi was "a conventional three-box saloon...it is a Beta under its skin but most of the body panels and the interior are completely new." The sales literature explained that the designers set out to create a classic three-box notchback saloon. The appearance of the car drew this comment from Autocar: "The Trevi is, to most eyes, a rather curious looking car, an odd combination of curves and angles, that produces an incipient spoiler from the slight upturn at the rear of the roof panel". The introduction of a saloon body-style was part of a general conservative trend in which existing fastback cars or unusually-styled cars were given more conventional appearances. The VW Golf body was given a boot in 1979 to become the VW Jetta, the Citroën Visa gained a grille as did the Fiat Ritmo, and the fastback Simca 1307 was restyled with a boot and sold as a Solara, and the Saab 900 also received a three-box version. "The residents of Staid Lane" wrote Paolo Tumminelli, "preferred conformity...as a courtesy to Reagan, Thatcher and Kohl, the old-fashioned saloon, standard bearer of the bourgeoisie, must be reanimated".

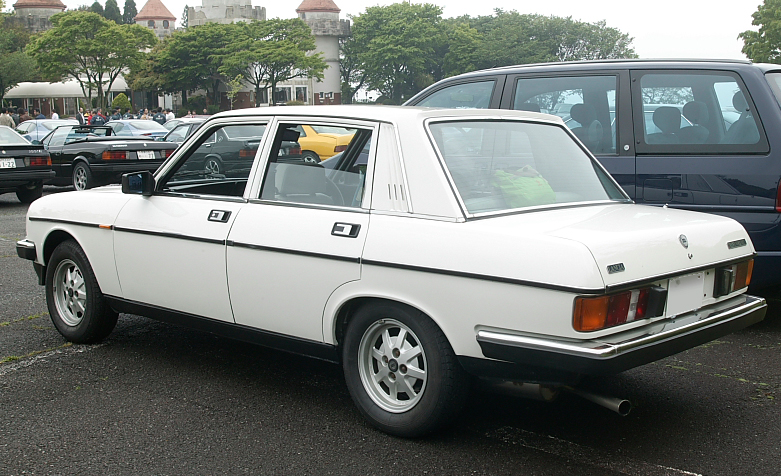
Lancia Trevi VX rear

The Trevi was available initially with two engines, a 1600 and 2000, both fitted with Weber or Solex carburetors. In the UK automatic transmission was optional only on the larger engined cars. In 1981 Bosch electronic ignition was made available on the 2000IE models. This allowed the engine to produce 122 CV at 6400 rpm (compared to 115 CV at 5500 rpm). The Trevi Volumex was the last version of the car, introduced in 1982 at the Turin motor show and designed to improve performance without affecting fuel economy. Fitted with a twin scroll Roots-type supercharger (and carburettors, rather than the expected fuel injection), this increased output to 135 CV (99 kW). This development meant the Trevi was the first car fitted with a mechanically driven supercharger in nearly five decades if not considering the 131 Volumetrico since it was a limited production run. It had revised front seats, a matt-black chin spoiler and plusher trim, with the seats upholstered in Zegna materials. As for the 2000IE, the Volumex also received a much-praised power steering from ZF as standard. Lancia UK did not import this version of the car to sell in Great Britain and Northern Ireland. The carburetted 2000 was discontinued during 1983, and production of the Trevi overall was discontinued in 1984. In total 36,784 examples of the Trevi were produced.

One interesting special model was a single "Trevi Bimotore" built by ex-Abarth engineer Giorgio Pianta in 1984. This car allowed Pirelli to carry out tire testing for the upcoming street version of the Lancia Delta S4. To provide all-wheel drive and equivalent power, this unique car was equipped with a second engine in the rear, necessitating large air intakes on the rear doors. The engines were lightly tuned Volumex units (using smaller pulleys to increase boost pressure), providing 150 CV each for a total of 300 CV (221 kW).

== Critical appraisal ==
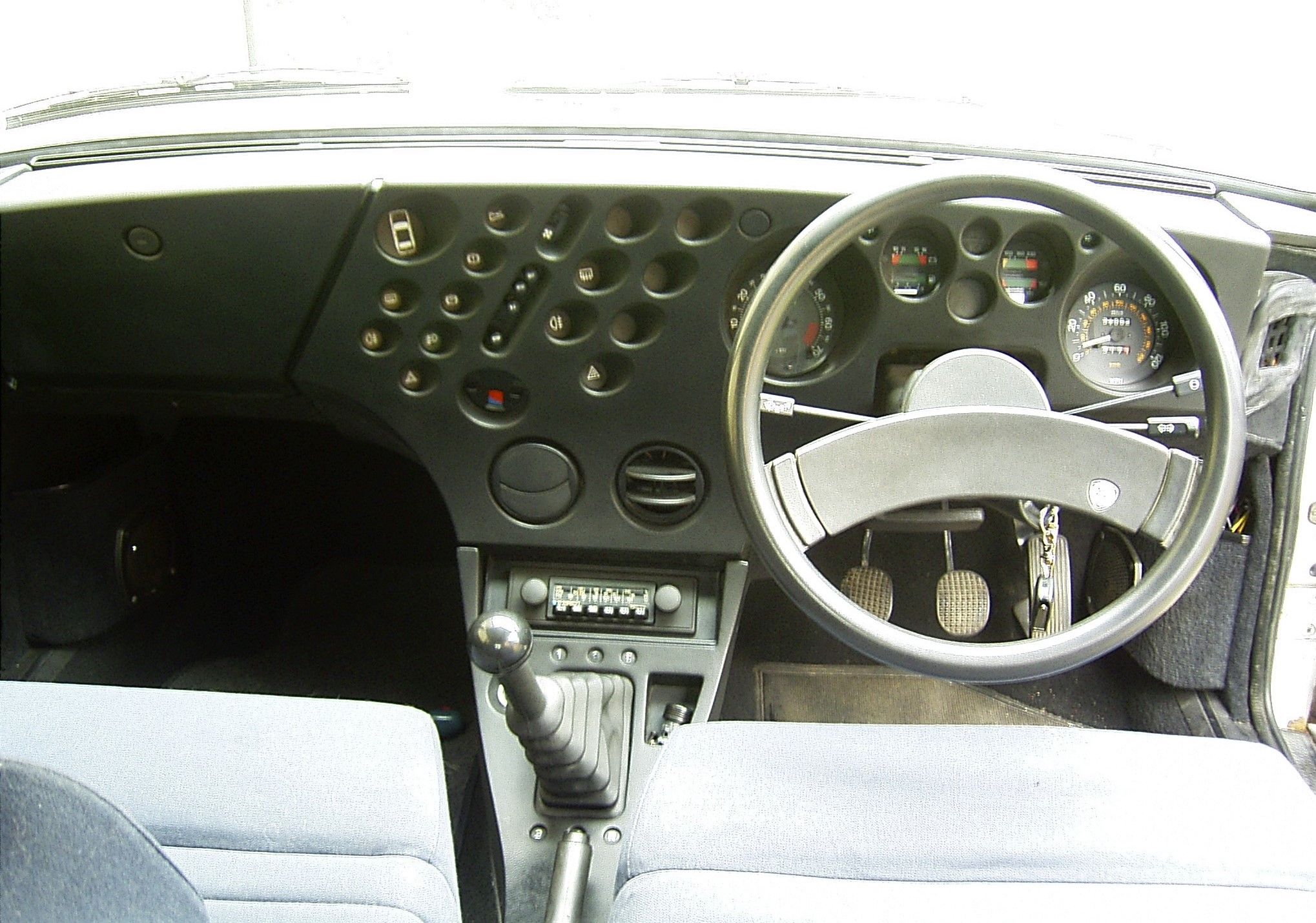
Trevi interior showing the "Swiss cheese" dashboard, designed by designer Mario Bellini

The Lancia Trevi was not met with a warm reception, drawing criticism from the UK press with few exceptions. The British magazine, CAR, wrote: "Ungainly new Trevi notchback worth a giggle, and the new Swiss cheese Beta dashboard is eye-popping" (this was the same dashboard as in the Trevi). The dashboard was a cause of some controversy. Mario Bellini, the interior's designer, describes the design thus: "A complex architecture of interiors in a small, very restricted space. A challenge tackled by the architect from a structural, and not purely aesthetic, angle ". Contemporary automotive journals described the dashboard as ugly, gimmicky and overstyled, resembling Swiss cheese, or having the appearance of something from the US television drama Star Trek. A review of the Volumex model commented that the "´Star Wars' fascia remains a disaster". A 2014 review of the Volumex model in Klassik Autobild described the dashboard as "hardly a masterwork" but also as "audacious".

=== Trevi 2000 ===
The UK's weekly Autocar reviewed the Lancia Trevi 2000 in August 1981. The article was the cover story for that issue. The front cover featured the Bellini-styled interior under the headline "Cutting a new dash...Lancia's Trevi tested."

The car's strong points were described as generally very good handling, good steering in urban areas, generous equipment and a powerful engine. The weak points were the car's poor packaging, confusing dashboard, poor ergonomics, poorly designed seats, tendency to lift-off oversteer and high fuel consumption. The Autocar verdict was that the Lancia Trevi had "the performance and economy to appeal to Lancia enthusiasts."

The article opened with an explanation that the Trevi was designed as a means to restore confidence lost during the Lancia Beta rust debacle where sales fell from 11,000 a year in 1977 to 7,000 in 1980. The car was reviewed under several headings: Performance, Economy, Noise, Road Behaviour, Brakes, Behind the Wheel and Living With the Car.

Under Performance, the car was criticised for torque steer. Though it had a "ponderous, clunky gearchange" the gearbox was spaced to require frequent use to find the balance between maximum power and maximum torque. 72% of the car's weight was over the front wheels. 115 bhp was deemed only adequate to pull what the author viewed as too much weight for a car of its size (1,184 kilos).

Under Testing, the car returned an average of 23 mpg (Imp.) though cautious driving meant 30 mpg was achievable. Autocar viewed the test figures as an improvement over the 24 mpg achieved by the Lancia Beta or the 20.3 mpg of the Lancia HPE of 1977. Fuel filling was "easy and clean." The Trevi's suspension was tuned around the Pirelli P6 radial ply tyre of size 185/65HR 14 inches. Autocar's view was that the result of this was that the Trevi was thus "among the ranks of the best handling saloons." Steering was "pleasantly light around town" but was too light for rapid, cross-country driving. The car's natural tendency was for understeer and predictable behaviour. However, the car was also capable of lift-off oversteer if the throttle was closed suddenly while cornering. Braking during the lift-off oversteer would cause the car to "viciously tighten its line, not something to be tried on a wet surface."

The 250 mm (9.8 in) brakes were described as not being outstandingly large, "soft" and "lacking immediate bite." However, the brakes performed well during fade tests. The handbrake could hold the car on a 1 in 4 slope but not a 1 in 3.

Under the heading of Noise, the twin-cam engine was described as sounding "unobtrusive." Wind noise was low and tyre and suspension noise was "generally low". Autocar addressed the matter of the interior design by calling it "unusual" and gave a full description of the dashboard which was called "confusing" for the driver and "boring" for the passenger". The seats were described as "disappointing, especially when the car's potentially high lateral g forces in cornering a taken into account". The seats did not provide enough sideways bolstering. Legroom in the rear was "limited" as was rear headroom. The lack of interior storage for oddments was described as a "glaring omission".

Autocar viewed the Lancia Trevi 2000 as competing with the following cars: the Alfa Romeo Alfetta 2.0, the Citroën CX Athena, the Fiat Mirafiori Sport, the Renault 20 TX and the Saab 900 GLS saloon. Of these the Trevi had the highest top speed (113 mph max speed), fourth fastest 0-60 mph time (11.1 seconds) and third best average consumption of 25.2 mpg.

Referring to the Volumex model Autocar magazine reported that despite the fitting of a Roots-style positive displacement supercharger "fuel economy is not penalised; an overall consumption of around 28 mpg has been quoted by Lancia".

The view of the UK's Car magazine in November 1981 was that the Trevi's main strength was handling with strong grip and "truly excellent balance that pleases and rewards a keen driver". The magazine cross-compared the Trevi 2000 with Citroën's CX Reflex and the Saab 900 GLs. The Lancia Trevi won the test, being "the fastest and best handling of the trio". The car's principle demerits were its "bland" "inappropriately conservative styling" and the dashboard which was "diabolical to use." The front seats were considered as lacking in lumbar support. CAR's opinion was favourable concerning the performance which it described as being due to the evenly-spread close ratios which had "a fairly low first and a top which allows the engine to go past peak power at maximum speed." This gave the Lancia "a distinct edge in terms of lower overall gearing." This helped because the Lancia had more torque and a lower weight than the cars to which it was being compared. Also relative to the test cars, the Lancia had a gearchange "as slick as silk with well-judged spring loading into the third/fourth plane, and appeared to need no more than a quick dip of the clutch to snatch changes". The Lancia came second to the Citroën in fuel consumption. The Lancia's test consumption was 24 mpg to the Citroën CX 2.0 litre's 27.9 mpg. Under the heading of comfort, the Lancia's springing and damping were praised for their gentle firmness though it was bested by the Saab 900 GLs. The driver's seat received commendation for its general comfort, being softer than the Saab and allowing more freedom to change position than the Citroën CX. The seats was felt to lack lumbar support. Under accommodation the Trevi's rear passenger room was viewed as being sufficient, on a par with the Saab. Only comparatively did the luggage volume lose points, due to the other two tested cars being "exceptional". Under the heading of driver appeal the Trevi was "badly let down by the gimmicky and over-styled fascia design". Visibility was held to be "good" due to the car's squared-off extremities. The main beam was good but the dipped beam described as "miserable" and "falling short of the point of safety if the car is being driven fast." Due to the chassis layout, steering characteristics and the choice of tyre, CAR's view was that the handling was very consistent with high levels of grip and a readiness to hold the required line of driving during cornering. Lifting off the throttle during cornering caused slight over-steer by "a few degrees."

Drive and Trail carried out a full test of the Lancia Trevi 2000. The car was viewed as a competitor to the Ford Cortina 2000 Ghia and Vauxhall Cavalier. The quoted price was 7,421 GBP. "Beneath the Trevi's conventional slab-fronted bonnet sits an extrovert twin-cam motor that's coupled to a close ratio five-speed gearbox... Mastering our car's fiery Latin temperament was a test of our tester's patience. It started out well enough on the auto choke, but the engine stuttered and spluttered along until the coolant's temperature needle was well into its normal running zone. The snag is that on a cold morning this can take up to three miles (5 km) to achieve. Worse still were the antics that follow the restarting of the test car's semi-warm engine. Each time the throttle was re-applied the engine's power disappeared like a rocket into a black hole - only to reappear just as suddenly to blast the Trevi away. It's annoying, it's embarrassing and it happens to other Trevis we have heard about." Balancing this, the author went on to write: "Once the Trevi has passed through these warm up tantrums, it's a reformed character. The engine's response is usually crisp and clean, the exceptions being the mild fuel starvation when the Trevi is cornered enthusiastically and minor plug fouling after prolonged low-speed crawling. The latter is generally cured by a generous dose of a heavy right foot on the accelerator".

On the general performance Drive and Trail continued: "It's a performance saloon that goes like a real sport: acceleration is as sparkling as an Alfa Romeo's or BMW's. If you enjoy rapid gear changing and keeping the tachometer's needle swinging around its red sector you'll find the Trevi a quick and rewarding car [...] one of the most appealing features of the engine is its wide spread of useable power and its tolerance of inappropriate gear selection." The writer commented that the selection of gear ratios might be well suited to ascending the mountain passes in the Trevi's homeland but that the ratios were inappropriate for steady motorway cruising. It was suggested a higher top gear might have been a better solution.

The clutch was criticized for being too heavy and the gear change affected by over-spring towards the third and fourth positions. Power steering was standard on the two-litre model in the UK. The design was praised for its unobtrusiveness, correct ratio and the accuracy of its action. The caveat was that "as usual though there is little feedback from the front tyres as the nose of the car nudges wide of the line on fast corners". About the tyres the comment was that "Lancia's engineers have honed the Trevi's handling so finely that only one make of tyre is approved, Pirelli's P6. It's a low profile tyre that gives a very high standard of grip in all weathers, and contributes to the well-balanced 'feel' of the car during rapid cornering." In the summary the steering was viewed as being much better than the regular Beta's.

About the driving position Drive and Trail commented: "Accepting that the Trevi is an accomplished, exciting car, it's all the more annoying that the driving position is so poor." The seats had a good view out but lacked lateral support and spinal support. The test reported an average fuel consumption of 25 mpg_{‑imp} (11 L/100 km; 21 mpg_{‑US}) (3 mpg worse than the class norm) and realistic range of 250 miles (400 km). The fuel tank held 11.4 imp gal (52 L; 13.7 US gal). The dashboard, designed by Italian architect Mario Bellini, was derogatorily compared to Gruyère cheese and "drew not one word of praise during our fortnight's testing." In 1982 What Car? copied the criticism: "[the] interior is also bizarre, featuring a curious and ineffective Gruyère cheese fascia". The packaging was criticised for being poor with less space for rear passengers than in the Beta, a lack of oddments space in the cabin and a glove box that was too small. The ventilation came in for criticism: "During our wintry test we were frequently fiddling with the controls in a vain attempt to get a comfortable atmosphere."

The overall summary of the author was that the Trevi was a "dynamic machine that makes fast driving on secondary roads a pleasure."

What Car? published a comparison test of the Lancia Trevi in March 1982. The Trevi 2000 was tested against the Citroën CX Reflex 2 litre and the Saab 900 GL 2.0 litre. The Trevi came last. The case against it was that the Trevi "has less to recommend it [than the CX and 900]. It is a reasonably good performer and moderately enjoyable to drive" but the few positive aspects of its design were outweighed by various demerits. The Trevi "fails to arouse enthusiasm the way a good Italian car should, and its ungainly rear end and cramped accommodation were further drawbacks."

In a discussion about the Lancia HPE to which the Trevi was related, LJK Setright of the UK's CAR magazine reported that the Trevi "...surprised me by its ability to maintain high speeds on rural roads....".

=== Trevi Volumex ===
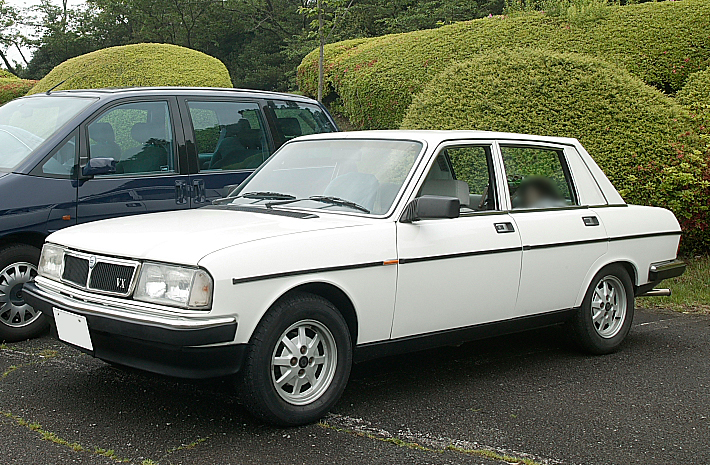
Lancia Trevi VX

Motor magazine conducted a short test of the Trevi Volumex model in 1982. While other manufacturers were pursuing turbocharging as a means to boost power, Lancia used mechanical forced induction, in order to give the impression of driving a larger engined car rather than a tuned one. The result was a car that "doesn´t feel quick...in short the Lancia's straight line performance has plenty of soul but little sparkle". Apart from the changes in performance, Motor reported that the car exhibited "the usual Trevi traits, good, bad and indifferent. The gearchange falls into the latter category - reasonably positive but somewhat clonky - though the intermediate ratios are nicely spaced. The well-balanced handling and fine grip remain first class and the ride is surprisingly supple".

The Trevi Volumex was also tested in continental Europe, with similar conclusions to those reached by British testers. A Belgian test praised the steering, while wondering where the performance went. Instead of the promised 9.6 second 0–100 km/h (62 mph) time, it took them 11.2 seconds. Other performance figures were very little improved over or even worse than those of a 2000IE tested earlier, in part due to longer gearing (which still failed to provide a higher top speed). Fuel consumption was as promised, until one tried to access some of the performance promised by the supercharger, when it became very high indeed. Interior fittings and finish received high grades, except for the "bizarre" dash. The conclusion (stated repeatedly) was that a fuel injected Trevi Turbo would have made a much better car, and that the considerably cheaper 2000IE was just as fast and had lower fuel consumption than the Volumex.

=== Trevi 1600 ===
By April 1983 CAR had this to say about the Trevi - which was by then only available as a 1.6 saloon. "For: Comfortable, roomy, cocoon-like body. Against: Lacks hatchback; 2.0 litre (now finished) was a better thing. Sum-up: Nice car once; left behind by lack of development. Lack of supporting range makes it an orphan. Hurts resale." At this time the entire Lancia range was relegated to the category of "Adequate" in CAR Magazine's listings section.

== Engines ==
Model	Displacement	Power	Torque	Note	Top Speed	0–100 km/h (0-62 mph)(s)
1.6	1,585 cc	101 PS (74 kW; 100 hp) at 5,800 rpm	134 N⋅m (99 lb⋅ft) at 3,000 rpm	1980–1984	170 km/h (106 mph)	n/a
2.0	1,995 cc	115 PS (85 kW; 113 hp) at 5,500 rpm	176 N⋅m (130 lb⋅ft) at 2,800 rpm	1981–1984	176 km/h (109 mph)	10.4
2.0 i.e.	1,995 cc	122 PS (90 kW; 120 hp) at 5,500 rpm	176 N⋅m (130 lb⋅ft) at 2,800 rpm	1981–1984	180 km/h (112 mph)	10.2
VX	1,995 cc Supercharged	135 PS (99 kW; 133 hp) at 5,500 rpm	206 N⋅m (152 lb⋅ft) at 3,000 rpm	1981–1984	190 km/h (118 mph)	9.6

== Production ==
Version	Years	Production
Beta Trevi 1600 I series	1980–1983	12,836
Beta Trevi 2000 and 2000 i.e. I series	1980–1983	17,364
Trevi 1600 II series	1983–1984	2,951
Trevi 2000 i.e. II series	1983–1984	3,633
Beta Trevi Volumex I-II series	1982–1984	3,844
Total		40,628
