= Lancia Borgo San Paolo Plant =

Italian factory

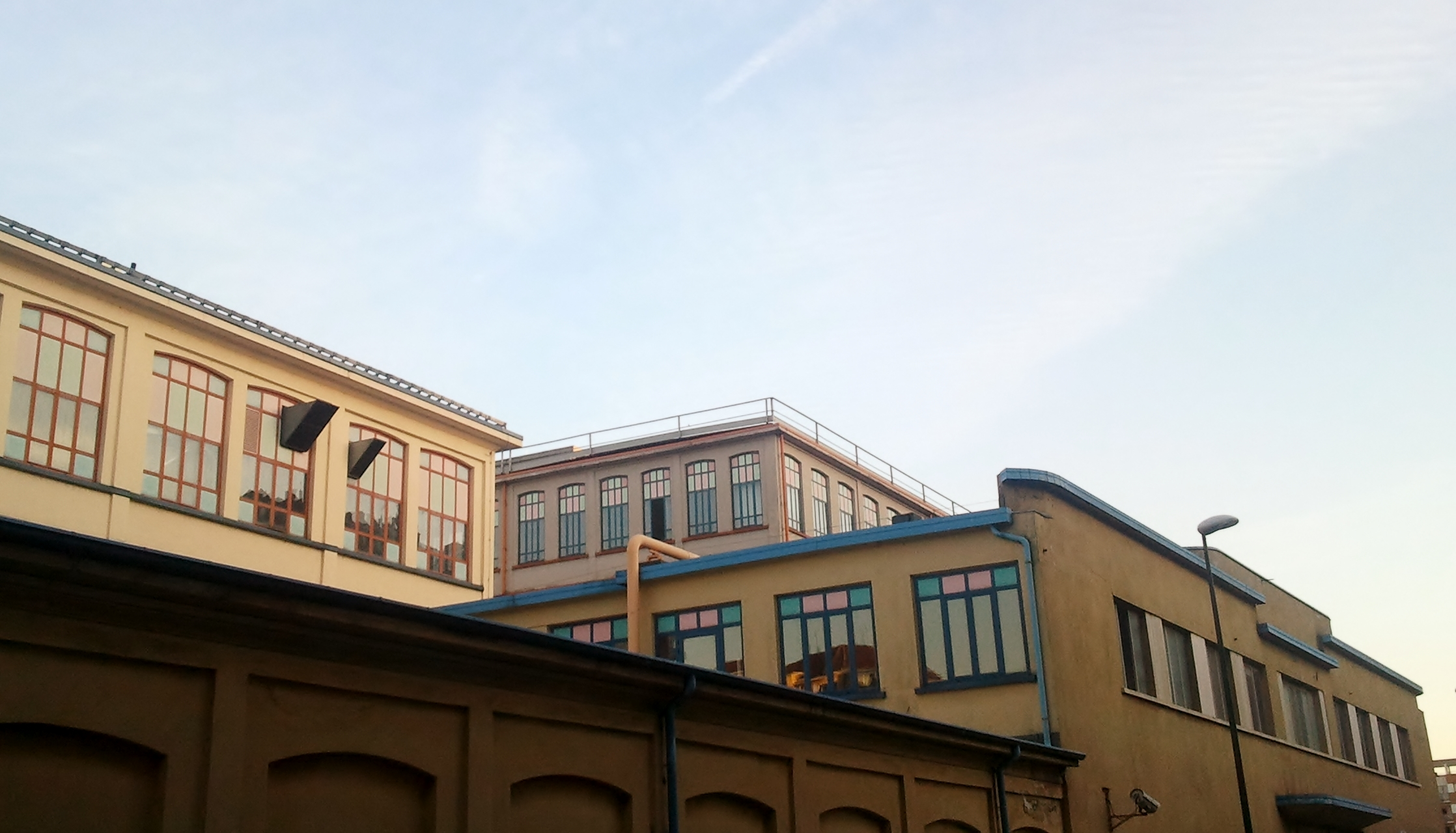

The Lancia Borgo San Paolo Plant was the first manufacturing plant of Italian automobile company Lancia. The plant manufactured Lancia's first vehicle models, and housed the company's central offices for more than five decades.

== History ==
The Borgo San Paolo Plant was built in Turin, Italy, on what is now known as Via Lancia (or Lancia Street) 1911. The early plant was divided into separate machine tool shop, assembly, and engine departments, and was unable to achieve competitively high levels of production (production grew from 131 vehicles in 1908 to just 258 in 1910).

Between 1932 and 1934, the plant added new subdivisions, including the 66,000 square-meter Via Monginevro. However, the plant was heavily bombarded during World War II.

Fiat acquired Lancia in 1969, leading to the progressive dismantling of the Borgo San Paolo Plant.

== Sources ==
- www.viva-lancia.com
- Marco Centenari, La favolosa Lancia. La storia, le macchine, le vittorie, Editoriale Domus, Milano 1976
- Alga D. Foschi, La parabola storica della Lancia attraverso la lettura dei bilanci in Le carte scoperte. Documenti raccolti e ordinati per un archivio storico della Lancia, FrancoAngeli, Milano 1990
- Franco Amatori, Per una storia economica della Lancia in Le carte scoperte. Documenti raccolti e ordinati per un archivio storico della Lancia, FrancoAngeli, Milano 1990
- Antonello Barocci, La fabbrica di Borgo San Paolo dalle origini al 1939 in Le carte scoperte. Documenti raccolti e ordinati per un archivio storico della Lancia, FrancoAngeli, Milano 1990
- Giuseppe Berta, Cinquant’anni di relazioni industriali alla Lancia (1919-1969) in Storia della Lancia. Impresa tecnologia e mercati, 1906-1909, Fabbri, Milano 1992
