= Lancia Beta =

Italian car produced from 1972 to 1984

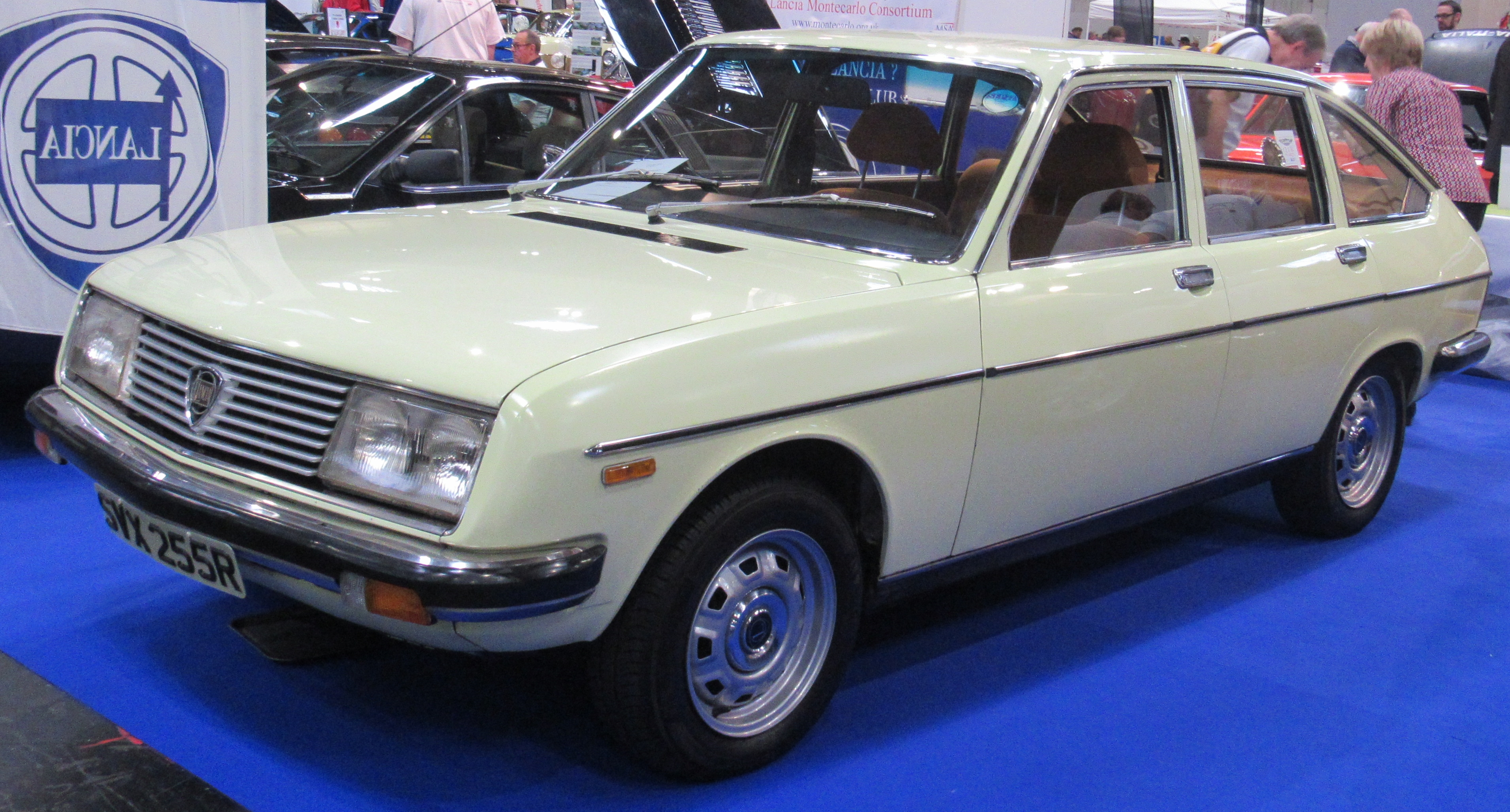
- 1977 Lancia Beta Berlina

Overview
- Manufacturer: Lancia
- Production: 1972–1984
- Assembly: Italy: Turin; Italy: Grugliasco (Pininfarina); Italy: Milan (Zagato: Spider); Spain: Pamplona (SEAT)
- Designer: Centro Stile Fiat (Berlina); Centro Stile Lancia under Piero Castagnero (Coupé and Trevi); Pininfarina (Spider, HPE and Montecarlo)

Body and chassis
- Class: Entry-level luxury car (D)
- Body style: 4-door fastback saloon (berlina); 4-door notchback saloon (Trevi); 2-door coupé; 2-door targa (Spider); 3-door shooting brake (HPE); 2-door mid-engined coupé (Montecarlo)
- Layout: Front-engine, front-wheel-drive Rear mid-engine, rear-wheel-drive (Montecarlo)
- Related: Lancia Trevi; Lancia Montecarlo

Powertrain
- Engine: 1.3 L I4 (petrol); 1.4 L I4 (petrol); 1.6 L I4 (petrol); 1.8 L I4 (petrol); 2.0 L I4 (petrol); 2.0 L supercharged I4 (petrol)

Dimensions
- Wheelbase: Berlina: 2,535 mm (99.8 in); Coupé: 2,350 mm (92.5 in)
- Length: Berlina: 4,293–4,320 mm (169.0–170.1 in); Trevi: 4,355 mm (171.5 in); Coupé: 3,993 mm (157.2 in); HPE: 4,285 mm (168.7 in); Spider: 4,040 mm (159.1 in); Montecarlo: 3,810 mm (150.0 in)
- Width: Berlina: 1,651 mm (65.0 in); Trevi: 1,700 mm (66.9 in); Spider: 1,646 mm (64.8 in); Montecarlo: 1,702 mm (67.0 in)
- Height: Berlina: 1,397 mm (55.0 in); Trevi: 1,400 mm (55.1 in); Coupé: 1,280 mm (50.4 in); HPE: 1,321 mm (52.0 in); Spider: 1,250 mm (49.2 in); Montecarlo: 1,190 mm (46.9 in)
- Kerb weight: 1,000–1,195 kg (2,205–2,635 lb)

Chronology
- Predecessor: Lancia Fulvia
- Successor: Lancia Prisma

The Lancia Beta (Type 828), stylised Lancia β, was an entry-level luxury car produced by Italian car manufacturer Lancia from 1972 to 1984. It was the first new model introduced by Lancia after it had been taken over by Fiat in 1969.

The Beta was made in several body styles, namely 4-door fastback saloon (Beta berlina), 4-door three-box, notchback saloon (Beta Trevi), 2-door coupé (Beta Coupé), 2-door targa (Beta Spider), 3-door estate (Beta HPE); a mid-engined sports car was also sold under the Beta name, the Lancia Beta Montecarlo.

== Etymology ==
The company chose the name Beta for a new vehicle to be launched in 1972, symbolising a new beginning as it reflected the fact that the company's founder, Vincenzo Lancia (1881–1937), had used letters of the Greek alphabet for his early vehicles – Alpha, Beta, Gamma, Delta, and so on. "Beta" had been used before, first for Lancia's 1908 car and again for a 1953 bus. Lancia had previously used the first letter of the Greek alphabet, Alpha, but this was not chosen for the new 1972 Lancia due to the obvious confusion it might cause with Alfa Romeo models.

== Origins ==
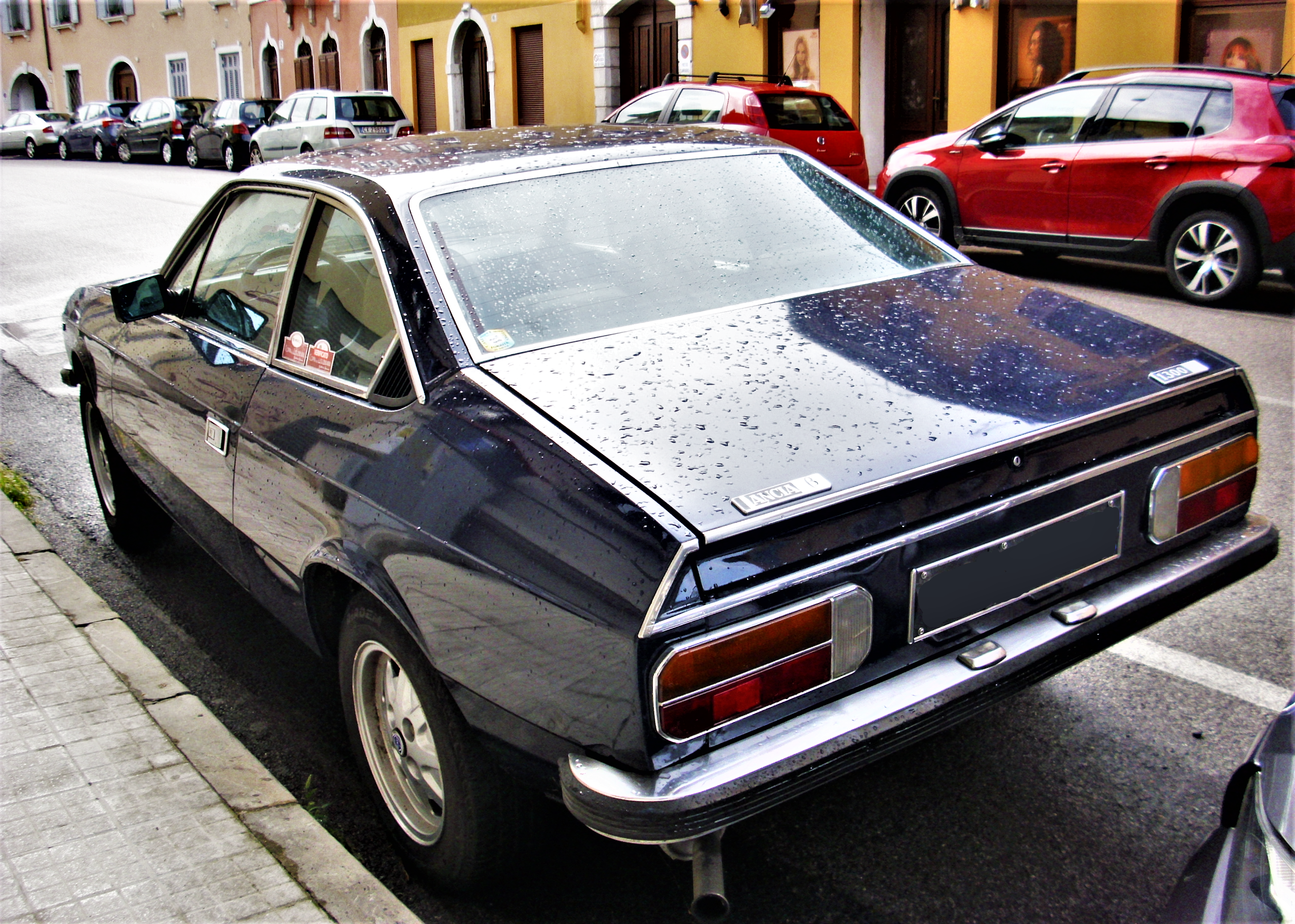
A pre-facelift Lancia Beta 1300 Coupé (Italy)

When Fiat acquired Lancia in 1969, the company had been without a Technical Director for the year following the death of Technical Director Antonio Fessia. Ing. Sergio Camuffo was given the job of developing the new model in early 1970.

Although in the difficult years before the Fiat take-over, a number of the engineering staff had left the company, Camuffo was able to pull together a core of Lancia engineers, who were tasked with getting the car into production by the end of 1972. Romanini, chassis design, Zaccone Mina, engine development, with Gilio and Bencini in testing. This was a very short timeframe, and development money was relatively limited. These were key factors that influenced the decision to use an existing power plant: the Fiat twin overhead cam, straight-four engine with its alloy head and cast iron block.

At the Beta's launch late in 1972 Fiat chief Gianni Agnelli told journalists that Lancia's output would be about 40,000 units in 1972 at a time when a volume of 100,000 was needed to cover the fixed costs involved in developing and building the cars. Lancia's lack of profitability was also evidenced by the absence of replacement models under development at the time of the Fiat take-over. The Lancia Fulvia, though much loved, had been developed with little concern for making it cost-effective to manufacture; it had therefore been sold at a high price in correspondingly low volumes.

The company's new owner's objective with the new Beta was to retain the quality image and price premium of existing Lancias, while minimising development time and production costs, using in-house Fiat group technology and parts where possible. The project adapted a well-regarded existing Fiat engine, fitted transversely and driving the front wheels, in line with Fiat's investment in this configuration during the previous decade. The gear box was a development of a transmission unit then being developed by Fiat-partner Citroën for a forthcoming model of their own. Above all, and in contrast with the Fulvia, the Beta design was relatively inexpensive to produce in volumes significantly higher than those achieved by predecessor Lancia saloons.

== Features ==
All versions of the car came with DOHC engines, five-speed gearboxes, rack and pinion steering, fully independent suspension using MacPherson struts, both front and rear, with disc brakes on all four wheels. The front-wheel-drive models were available in a number of engine capacities ranging from 1.3-litres to 2.0-litres. Breathing was provided by a single Weber carburettor until fuel injection was introduced on late two-litre HPE and Coupe models.

As with a number of previous front-wheel drive-Lancia models, the engine and gearbox were mounted on a subframe that bolted to the underside of the body. However, in the Beta the engine and manual gearbox were fitted transversely in-line. This Fiat-inspired configuration not only enabled neat engine bay packaging, but also, by tilting the engine 20 degrees rearwards, the Lancia engineers achieved improved weight transfer over the driven wheels and towards the centre of the car, as well as lowering the centre of gravity. The rear-wheel drive Lancia Montecarlo employed a similar layout except the subframe was mounted at the rear.

On the front-wheel drive Betas, Lancia designed a particularly original independent rear suspension with MacPherson struts attached to parallel transverse links that pivoted on a centrally mounted cross member bolted to the underside of the floorpan. An anti-roll bar was fitted to the floorpan ahead of the rear struts with both ends of the bar trailing back to bolt to the rear struts on each side. This unique design went on to be used in later Lancia models. The design was never patented by Lancia, and consequently inspired similar rear suspension system layouts in other manufacturers' vehicles during the 1980s and 1990s.

A short wheelbase coupé was introduced in June 1973, then the following year the 2+2 Spider convertible. At the 1975 Geneva Motor Show Lancia launched the HPE (High Performance Estate), styled in a similar vein to the Reliant Scimitar and Volvo 1800ES while utilizing the wheelbase of the Berlina. Later the Beta Montecarlo, a two-seater mid-engined coupé was launched.

The different models all underwent various revisions and improvements over the years. Power steering specially produced by the German company ZF became available on certain Left Hand Drive models and was also used on the Gamma. For 1975 the exterior styling was modified by Pininfarina: "the back window has been relocated in a more upright position" to aid visibility, the rear quarter pillars gained sharper trailing edges, the waistline was lowered and windows made larger. Electronic ignition became available in 1978. Automatic transmission became available the same year; the Beta was the first Lancia manufactured with an automatic transmission factory option. In 1981 power steering also became available on certain Right Hand Drive models. Also in that year a fuel-injected version of the 2.0-litre engine became available on certain models. The Coupé and HPE underwent a facelift in June 1983 (at the same time that the supercharged VX versions were introduced) and remained available for a little while longer than the other bodystyles.

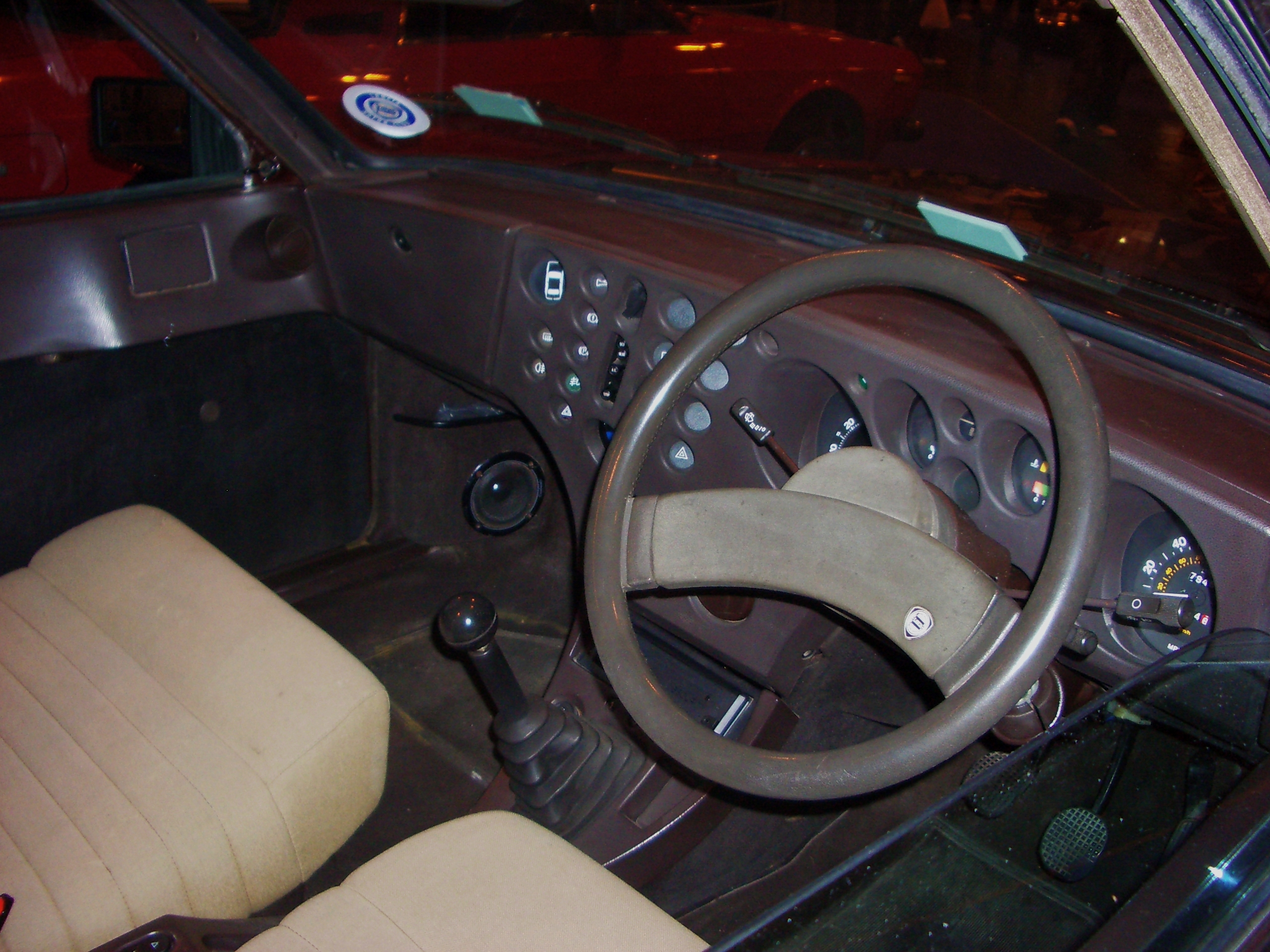
The Mario Bellini dashboard of the Trevi and third-series Berlina, with deeply recessed dials and controls

Late in the model's life Lancia released the Trevi VX, with a Roots-type supercharger fitted between the carburettor and low-compression two-litre engine; the Coupé VX and HPE VX followed soon after (June 1983). These three variants were known as Volumex models and had the highest performance of all the road-going production Betas, with 135 bhp (101 kW) and substantially increased torque over the normal two-litre 200 N⋅m (148 lb⋅ft). The Coupé VX and HPE VX can be distinguished from the normal cars by the offset bulge on the hood which is required to clear the new air intake, a spoiler fitted below the front bumper and the rubber rear spoiler. They also have stiffer spring rates. Lancia produced 1272 Coupé VX, 2370 HPE VX and 3900 Trevi VX. Most were left-hand drive (only 186 right-hand drive HPEs and around 150 RHD Coupés were imported to the UK, however the car was also sold in some other RHD markets so exact RHD production remains unknown). Only one right-hand drive Trevi VX was made.

A small number of Trevis were built to run on LPG rather than petrol (gasoline).

=== In North America ===
This car marked a brief return of Lancia to the United States market beginning in 1975. Federalization was not quite harmonious, though, which combined with a lack of dealers to dissuade US buyers. All bodystyles except the Trevi were on offer at one time or another, although some were sold under different names: the Spider was sold as the Lancia Zagato (from 1979) and the Montecarlo as the Lancia Scorpion (because Chevrolet already had rights to the Monte Carlo model name in the US). Federalized cars were originally sold with a 1756 cc twin-cam engine with 86 hp (64 kW). This later dropped to 83 hp (62 kW) as emissions rules were tightened. For the 1979 model year, a two-litre engine was installed, with power up somewhat, to 87 hp (65 kW). More importantly, torque was up by 17 per cent. A black and gold Zagato Limited Edition (LE) of 500 cars was offered for 1979, followed by a Special Edition (SE) of similar livery for 1981. Quality problems meant that US inspectors went to visit the plant to see what could be improved, but Lancia took a hiatus and did not bring any 1980 models. When returning in 1981, the Berlina was dropped as they focussed on the more popular sporting variants. Fuel injection increased the 2.0's power considerably, to about 108 hp (81 kW) (the published numbers vary considerably). 1982 was the last year for Lancia's half-hearted efforts in the United States.

== Model range ==
The Beta was available in a number of different body styles:

=== Berlina ===
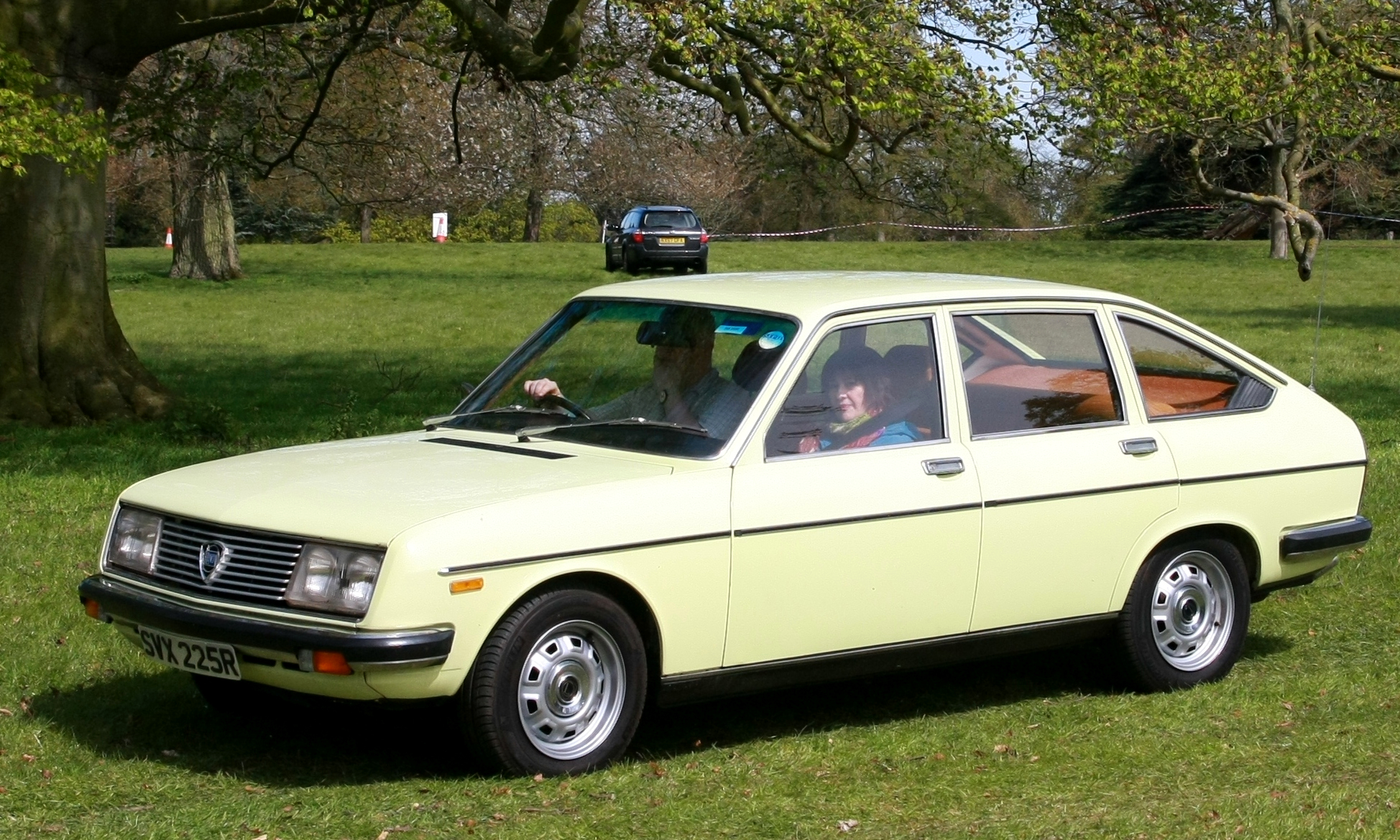
Beta Berlina series II

Introduced in 1972, the first body style to appear, and the most common was the four-door berlina (saloon), with a wheelbase of 2,535 mm (99.8 in) and 'fastback' styling giving the appearance of a hatchback, although in fact it had a conventional boot like a saloon. This practice was common in the industry at the time as manufacturers deemed that hatchback designs would not be accepted in this market sector.

It featured 1400, 1600 and 1800 transversely mounted twin-cam engines based on earlier Fiat designs along with five speed gearbox. In 1974 the 1.8ES version was launched featuring electric windows, alloy wheels and sunroof. At the Turin Auto Show in November 1974 a 1300 engine joined the range at the bottom, then in the fall of 1975 the existing 1600 and 1800 engines were replaced by new 1600 and 2000 units. The 2.0-litre units had improved torque (up 20% to 128 lb ft at 2800 rpm). In the same year Lancia returned to the US market with the Beta. Automatic versions were introduced in 1978. In 1981 the 2.0 became available with electronic fuel injection. Berlina production ended in 1981.

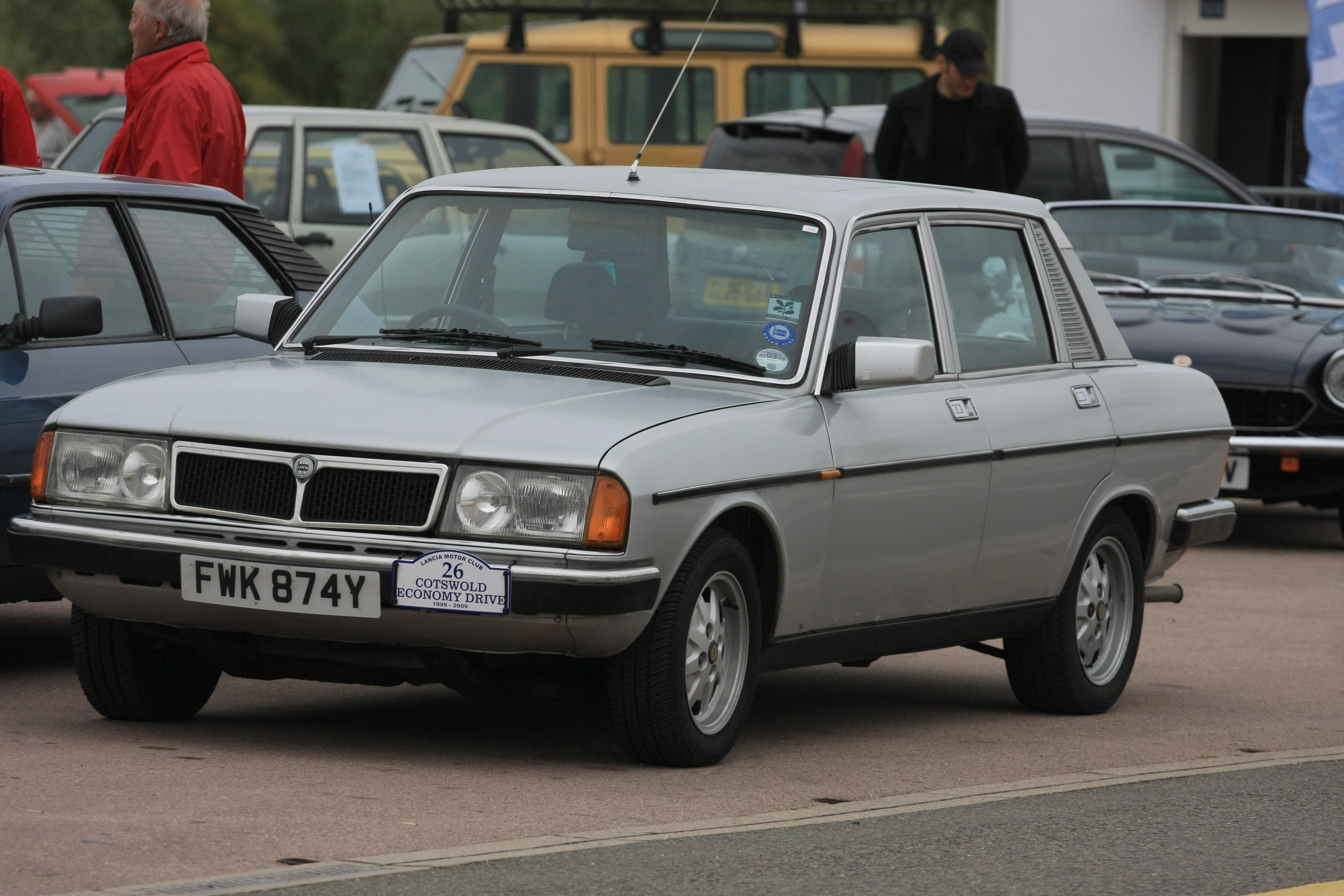
Beta Trevi

=== Trevi ===
Late in the Beta's life, with assistance from Pininfarina, a substantially reworked 4-door three-box, notchback saloon variant was released as the Trevi; the Trevi also introduced an original new dashboard layout designed by Mario Bellini which was then applied to the third series Berlina.

Number built: 194,914 Berlinas plus 36,784 Trevis.

=== Coupé ===
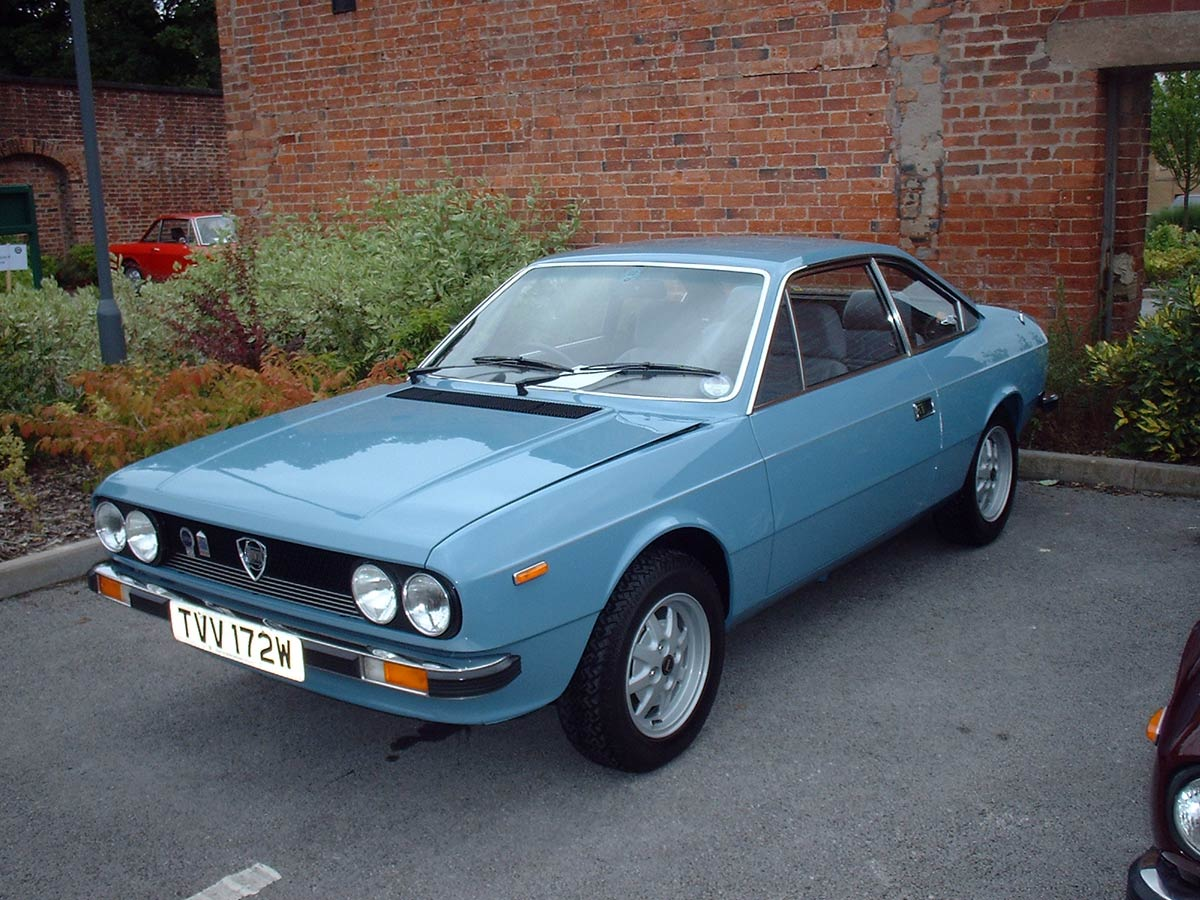
Beta Coupé

In 1973 the second style to appear was a 2+2 two-door coupé with a 2,350 mm (92.5 in) wheelbase, although due to the fuel crisis did not become available to the public until early 1974. It was launched with 1.6 and 1.8L engines. New 1.6 and 2.0L engines replaced the original units in late 1975, followed by a 1.3L in early 1976. In 1978, the Beta Coupé became available with an automatic transmission and power steering. In 1981, the car received a minor facelift and at the same time the 2.0 became available with fuel Bosch electronic fuel injection. In 1983, a 2.0 VX supercharged engine became available with an output of 135 bhp. The bodywork was developed inhouse by Centro Stile Lancia led by Aldo Castagno, with Piero Castagnero acting as styling consultant. Castagnero had also styled the Beta's predecessor, the Lancia Fulvia saloon and coupé. Number built: 111,801.

This was one of the bodystyles to be marketed in North America. The 2.0L twin-cam I4 offered in North America produced 108 hp (81 kW; 109 PS) at 5500 rpm.

=== Spider (Zagato) ===
Beta Spider

The next version to be launched was a two-door convertible called the Spider (or Zagato in America), also with 2+2 seating. The Spider used the coupé's shorter wheelbase and featured a targa top roof panel, a roll-over bar and folding rear roof. Early models did not have a cross-member supporting the roof between the tops of the A to B Pillars. Later models had fixed cross-members. Production started in 1975. It was initially powered by either the 1600 or 1800 twin-cam engine, later being replaced by the new 1.6 and 2.0. In Europe, it never received the fuel injected engine, although a fuel injected version was sold in the US market in 1981 and 1982. The Spider was designed by Pininfarina but actually built by Zagato. The construction process was complex, with coupé bodies-in-white being delivered to Zagato for the roofless conversion, then back to Lancia for rust-proofing, then back to Zagato for paint, interior and trim, and then back to Lancia for a third time for engine installation and final assembly. Lancia probably lost money on every car built. Number built: 9,390.

In the early 1980s Lancia also produced a small number of Lancia Spider Volumex (supercharged) cars. This was the last Lancia to be offered in the United States, being the company's sole offering in 1982, their last year in the country.

=== HPE ===
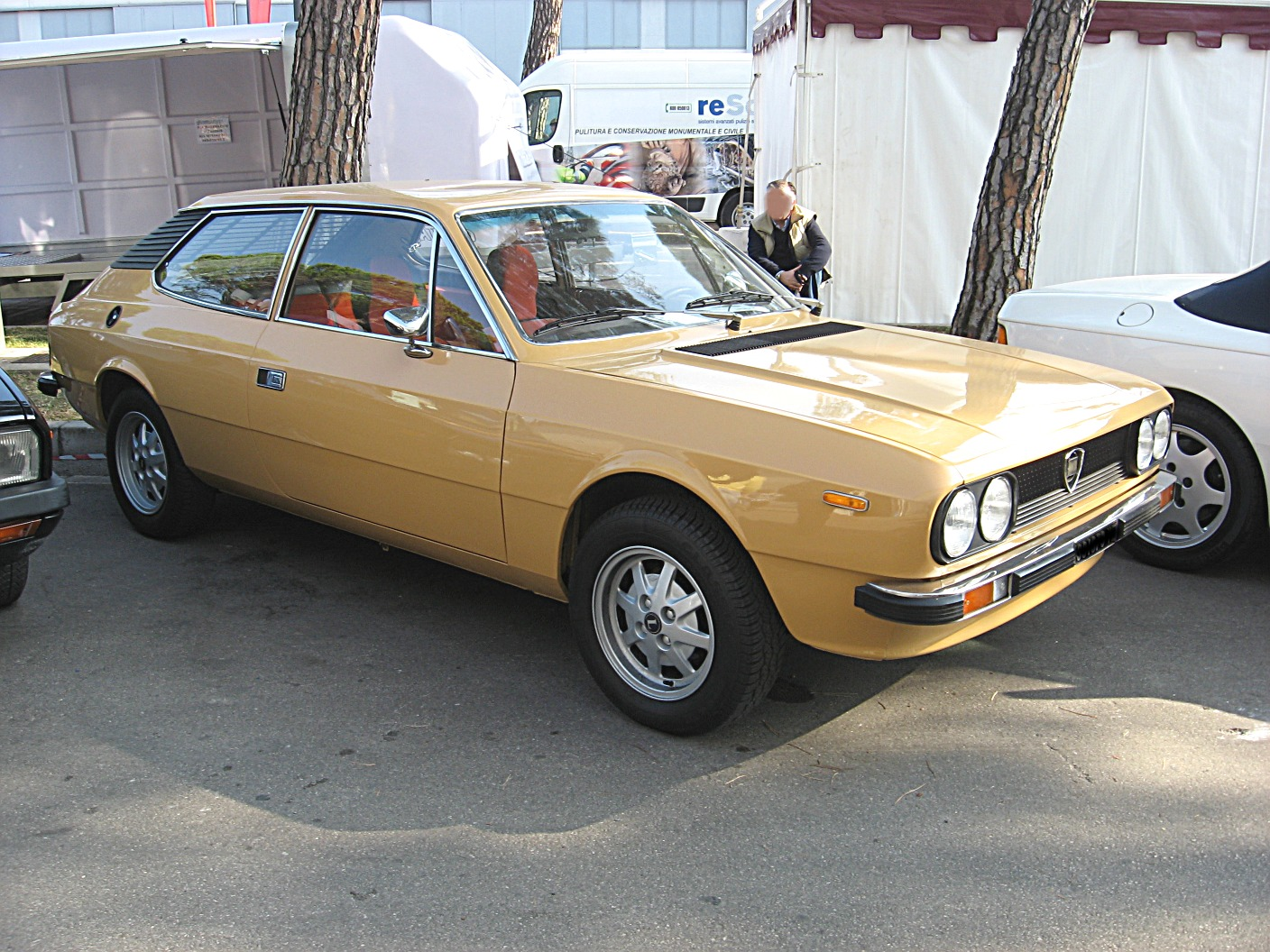
Beta HPE - First Series

The Beta HPE was a three-door sporting estate or shooting brake introduced in March 1975. HPE stood for High Performance Estate, and then later High Performance Executive. This model had Berlina's longer wheelbase floorpan combined with the coupé's front end and doors. The HPE was developed by Pininfarina. At launch it came with either 1600 or 1800 twin-cam engines, these being replaced in November of the same year by new 1.6 and 2.0 units. In 1978, like other Beta models automatic transmission became available along with power steering. It was renamed the H.P.Executive (without the Beta) from 1979 and in autumn 1981 gained the option of a fuel injected 2.0 engine. In 1984 a 2.0VX supercharged version became available. Like all other models in the Beta range the HPE was discontinued in 1984, after 73,626 Beta HPEs had been built.

=== Montecarlo ===
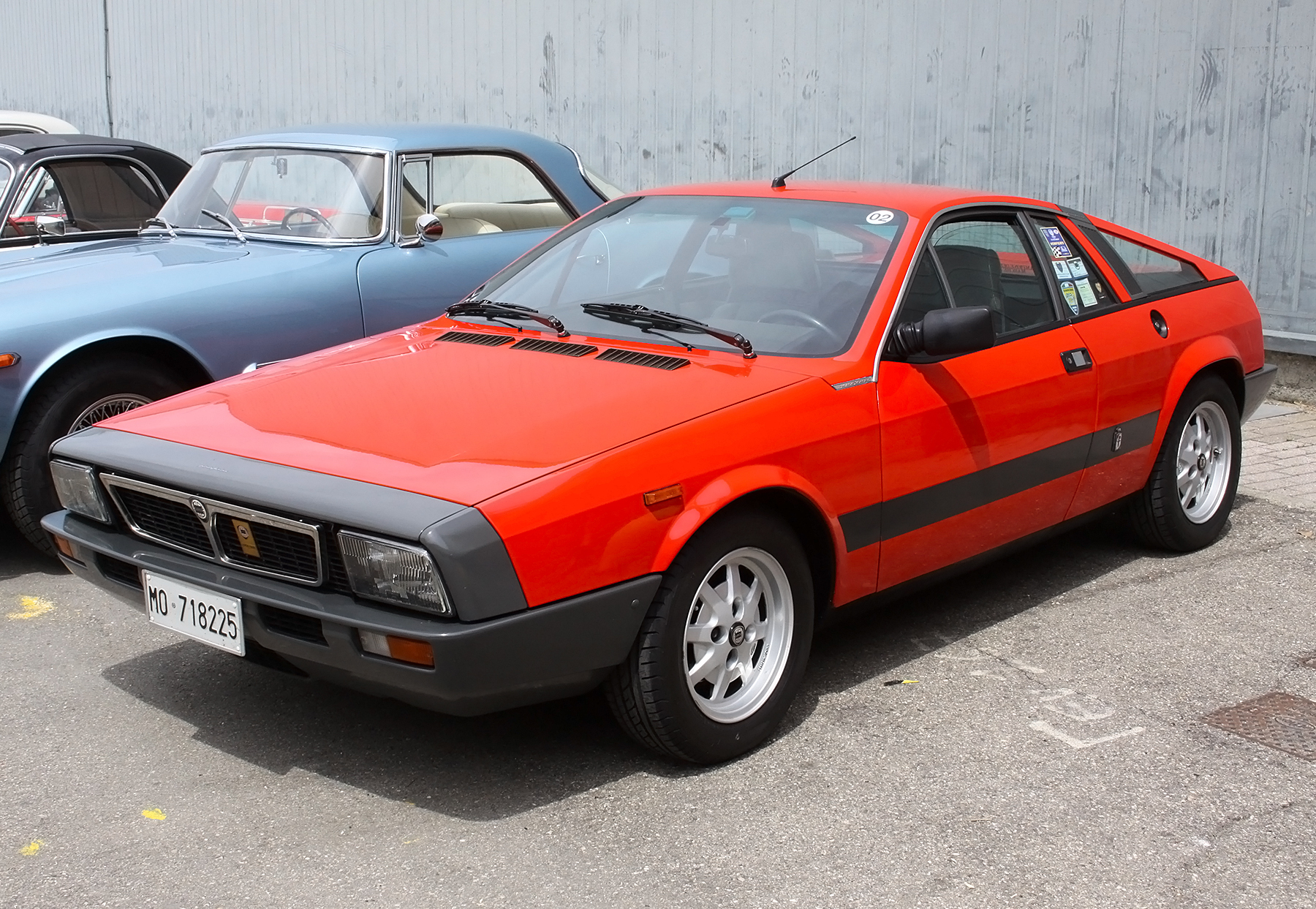
Beta Montecarlo

The final car to carry the Beta badge was the Pininfarina-designed and built two-door Lancia Montecarlo, announced in March 1974. This was a rear-wheel drive, mid-engined two-seater sports car that shared very few components with other Betas. The car was originally designed as Pininfarina's contender to replace Fiat's 124 Coupe, but lost out to Bertone's cheaper design, which became the Fiat X1/9. Pininfarina's design was called the X1/20 at the prototype stage. Lancia launched the Montecarlo as a premium alternative to the X1/9, with the 2.0L twin cam engine rather than the X1/9's single cam 1.3L. Both used a similar chassis floorplan, based on the Fiat 128 MacPherson strut front suspension and disk brakes at both front and rear. Lancia Beta parts were limited to those from the existing Fiat/Lancia standard parts bin: the transverse-mount version of the Fiat 124's twin cam engine and the five-speed gearbox and transaxle.

Montecarlos were available as fixed head "Coupés" and also as "Spiders" with solid A and B pillars, but a large flat folding canvas roof between them. The very first examples had steel panels to the rear wings above the engine bay, but this limited version made reversing difficult and it was replaced by glass panels. This gave a flying buttress appearance to the rear, similar to the Maserati Merak.

First Series cars (1975–1978) were badged Lancia Beta Montecarlo. They were named "Montecarlo", written as one word, not Monte Carlo, one of Monaco's administrative areas, although the rear badge reads "MONTE-CARLO". There was then a 2-year gap in production in order to revise a brake issue where the brakes had a tendency to lock up. Lancia solved this problem by removing the brake servo. The revised Second Series cars (1980–1981) were simply badged as Lancia Montecarlo. In the United States, the First Series cars were marketed as the Scorpion alongside the rest of the Beta range, as General Motors was already using the name Monte Carlo for a Chevrolet model. The Scorpion name was a reference to Abarth.

7,798 Montecarlos were built between 1975–81.

== Lancia with Fiat elements ==
For some the Beta was not a Lancia but rather a Fiat. However Lancia had some autonomy from Fiat in the development of the Beta.

The main reason for the Fiat label was that despite its unique Lancia chassis, suspension, interior and bodywork, the Beta used a Fiat-based engine. The Fiat Twin Cam engine, originally designed by Aurelio Lampredi, who built engines for Ferrari until Fiat employed him, was one of the most advanced 4-cylinder engines in Europe at that time. It continued in production well into the 1990s and, in highly developed form, was used in performance road cars such as the Lancia Delta Integrale and Fiat Coupé.

The Lancia engineers made minor changes to the engines fitted to the Beta range. These included new inlet and exhaust manifolds as well as different carburation. In addition the mounting points on the engine block were different so as to allow for the transverse installation as opposed to the longitudinal installation utilised by the rear-wheel-drive Fiats. For these reasons the engines are not interchangeable between Betas and contemporary Fiats such as the Fiat 132.

=== Engines ===
Model	Years	Engine	Displacement	Power	Fuel system
1400	1972–1974	I4 DOHC	1438 cc	90 PS (66 kW; 89 hp)	carburettor
1600	1972–1975	I4 DOHC	1592 cc	100–108 PS (74–79 kW; 99–107 hp)	carburettor
1800	1972–1975	I4 DOHC	1756 cc	110–120 PS (81–88 kW; 108–118 hp)	carburettor
1300	1974–1975	I4 DOHC	1297 cc	82 PS (60 kW; 81 hp)	carburettor
1600	1975–1984	I4 DOHC	1585 cc	100 PS (74 kW; 99 hp)	carburettor
2000	1975–1984	I4 DOHC	1995 cc	119 PS (88 kW; 117 hp)	carburettor
1300	1976–1979	I4 DOHC	1301 cc	85 PS (63 kW; 84 hp)	carburettor
2000 i.e.	1980–1984	I4 DOHC	1995 cc	122 PS (90 kW; 120 hp)	fuel injection
2000 VX	1982–1984	I4 DOHC	1995 cc	135 PS (99 kW; 133 hp)	carburettor, supercharger

== Legacy ==
The Beta was very well received by the motoring press and public when launched. The various models were praised for their performance and their good handling and roadholding. They were widely regarded as a "driver's car" with plenty of character. The Beta was competitively priced in export markets and managed to become the highest ever selling Lancia model up to that point.

Unfortunately the Beta gained a reputation for being rust-prone, particularly the 1st Series vehicles (built from 1972 to 1975). A widely circulated rumor states that the cars used Soviet steel supplied to Fiat in return for building the Lada factory. However, these claims have never been verified. The steel problems are more likely due to poor rustproofing techniques as well as the prolonged strikes that plagued Italy at that time rather than the metal's origin.

The corrosion problems could be structural; for instance where the subframe carrying the engine and gearbox was bolted to the underside of the car. The box section to which the rear of the subframe was mounted could corrode badly, causing the subframe to become loose. Although tales of subframes dropping out of vehicles were simply not true, a vehicle with a loose subframe would fail a technical inspection. It was not just the Series 1 cars or saloons - according to an employee of the recycling firm that disposed of the Betas, the Series 2, HPE, Coupe and Spider models were all affected and by late 1983, the scrap dealer Hallett metals in Crewkerne, Somerset had crushed the last of the affected cars. In fact, by 1983 Series 2 cars outnumbered Series 1 models by a large percentage. Deliveries to Hallett Metals were handled mainly by transport company Abbey Hill. Before being crushed (flattened), the engine and gearboxes would be removed and placed in a separate container and no parts were to be removed or resold to the public.

In the UK (Lancia's largest export market at the time), the company listened to the complaints from its dealers and customers and commenced a campaign to buy back vehicles affected by the subframe problem. Some of these vehicles were 6 years old or older and belonged to 2nd or 3rd owners. Customers were invited to present their cars to a Lancia dealer for an inspection. If their vehicle was affected by the subframe problem, the customer was offered a part exchange deal to buy another Lancia or Fiat car. The cars that failed the inspection were scrapped. However, on 9 April 1980 the Daily Mirror and TV programmes reported on the issue. There were claims that the problem persisted in later cars by showing photographs of scrapped 1st Series saloons, referring to them as being newer than five and six years old. Other contemporary manufacturers whose cars also suffered from corrosion were not treated as harshly. Lancia had already introduced one year previously a 6-year anti-corrosion warranty - an automotive first in the UK.

Whilst later Betas (2nd Series cars) had reinforced subframe mounting points and post-1979 cars were better protected from the elements, these issues damaged the whole marque's sales success on most export markets. The revision to the crossmember was quite simple and meant turning it through 180 degrees forming an 'n' channel rather than a 'u' channel thus preventing dirt and water collecting and causing rust.

== Specials ==
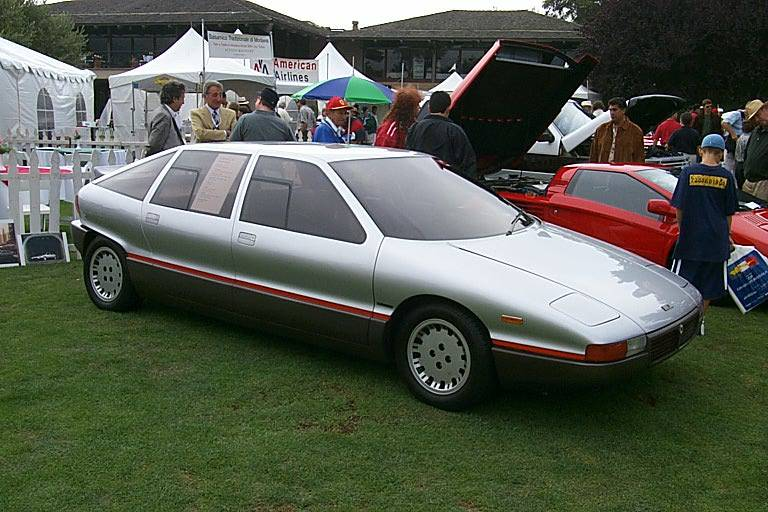
Lancia Medusa

Giovanni Michelotti produced three concept cars on Beta mechanicals. Two were four-door saloons based on the Berlina—one unusual in having four gull-wing doors—the other was a two-seater open-top car based on the Coupé.

In 1980, Giorgetto Giugiaro built a concept car on Montecarlo mechanicals, called the Medusa. Unusually for a mid-engined car it had four doors, and the body was shaped to have a very low drag coefficient for the time.

Lancia built one very special variant of the Beta themselves. The twin-engined Trevi Bimotore was used for tests related to Lancia's new four-wheel drive rally cars; it was powered by one Volumex engine under the bonnet driving the front wheels, and another in the back driving the rear wheels, with air scoops in the rear doors. The two gearboxes were linked, and an electronically controlled throttle replaced the mechanical system so the two engines worked together.

== Pamplona assembly ==
There are few records of Lancias ever being assembled outside Italy but, exceptionally, Betas were. It was announced in August 1976 that SEAT would commence Spanish production of the Lancia Beta. Three years later Beta production by SEAT indeed commenced at the company's recently acquired Pamplona plant, though only the Coupé and HPE lift-back versions were included. The arrangement was short lived from 1979 up to 1980 because of a falling out in the early 1980s between Fiat, Lancia's parent company, and the Spanish government over the increasingly urgent need for investment to upgrade the SEAT range. In 1982 Volkswagen became SEAT's major auto-industry partner, and under the new regime the plant that had assembled the Lancia Beta, SEAT Panda and SEAT 124 switched to building the Volkswagen Polo.

== Gallery ==
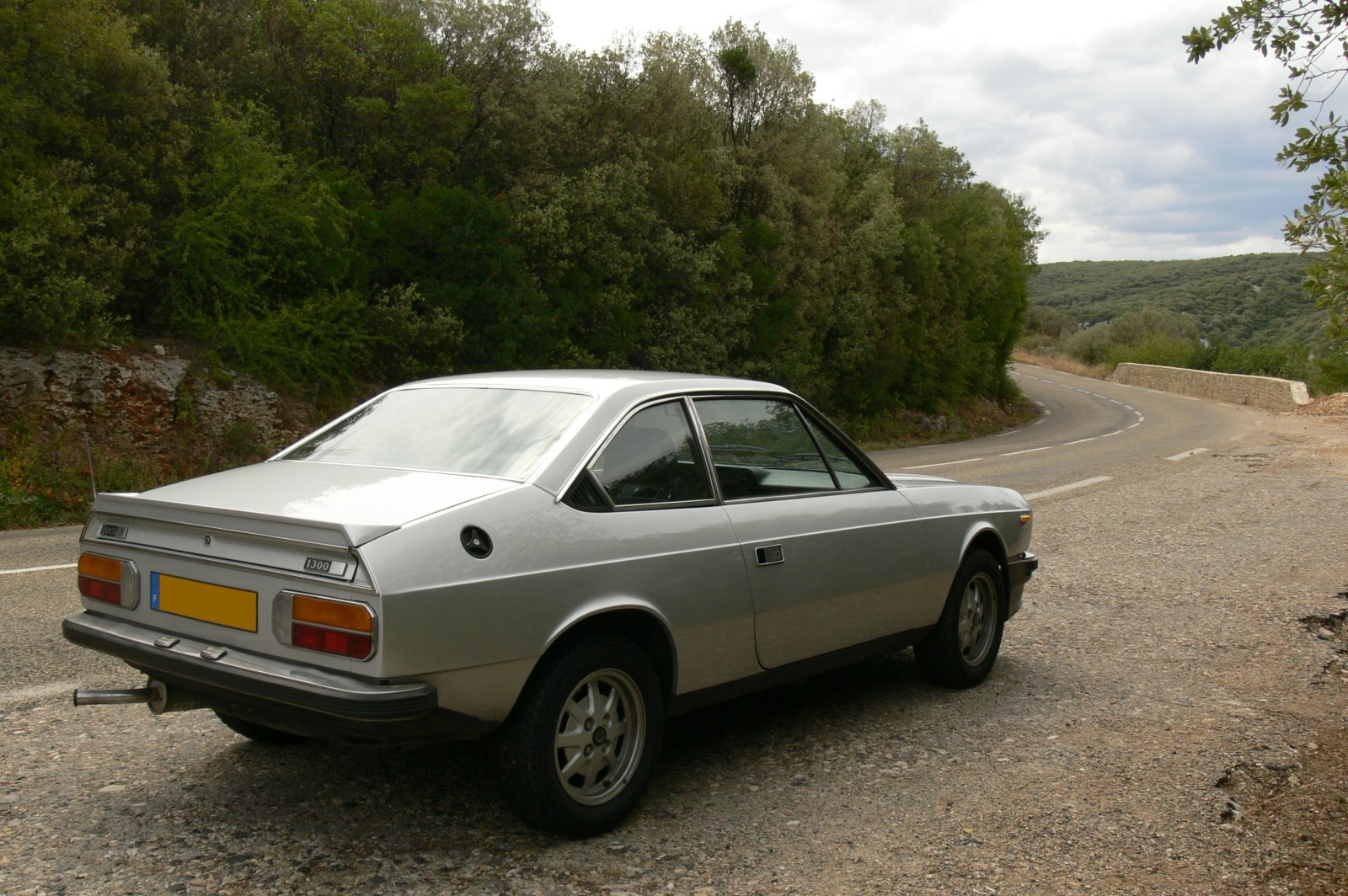
Lancia Beta Coupé

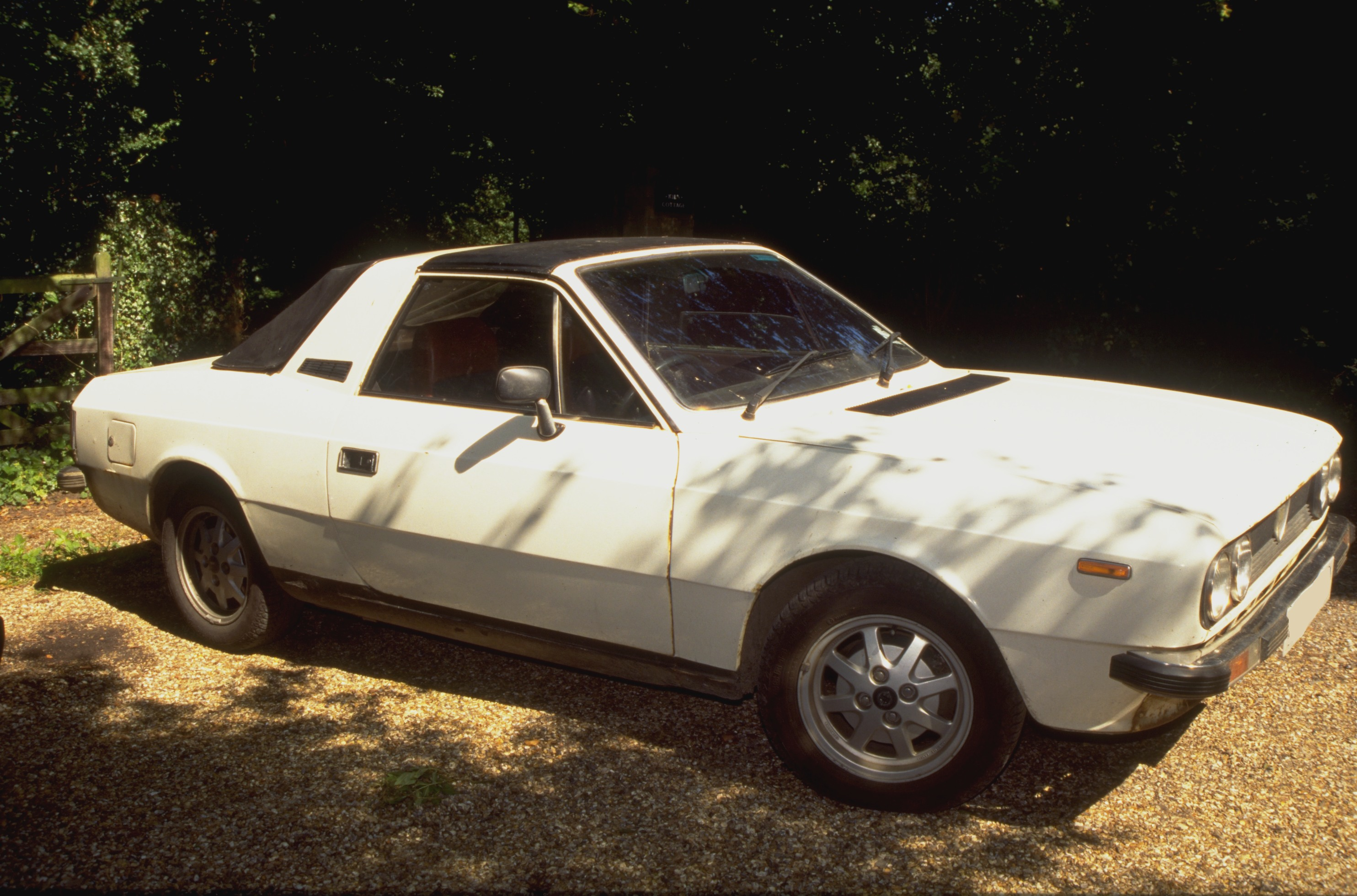
Lancia Beta Spider (roof on)

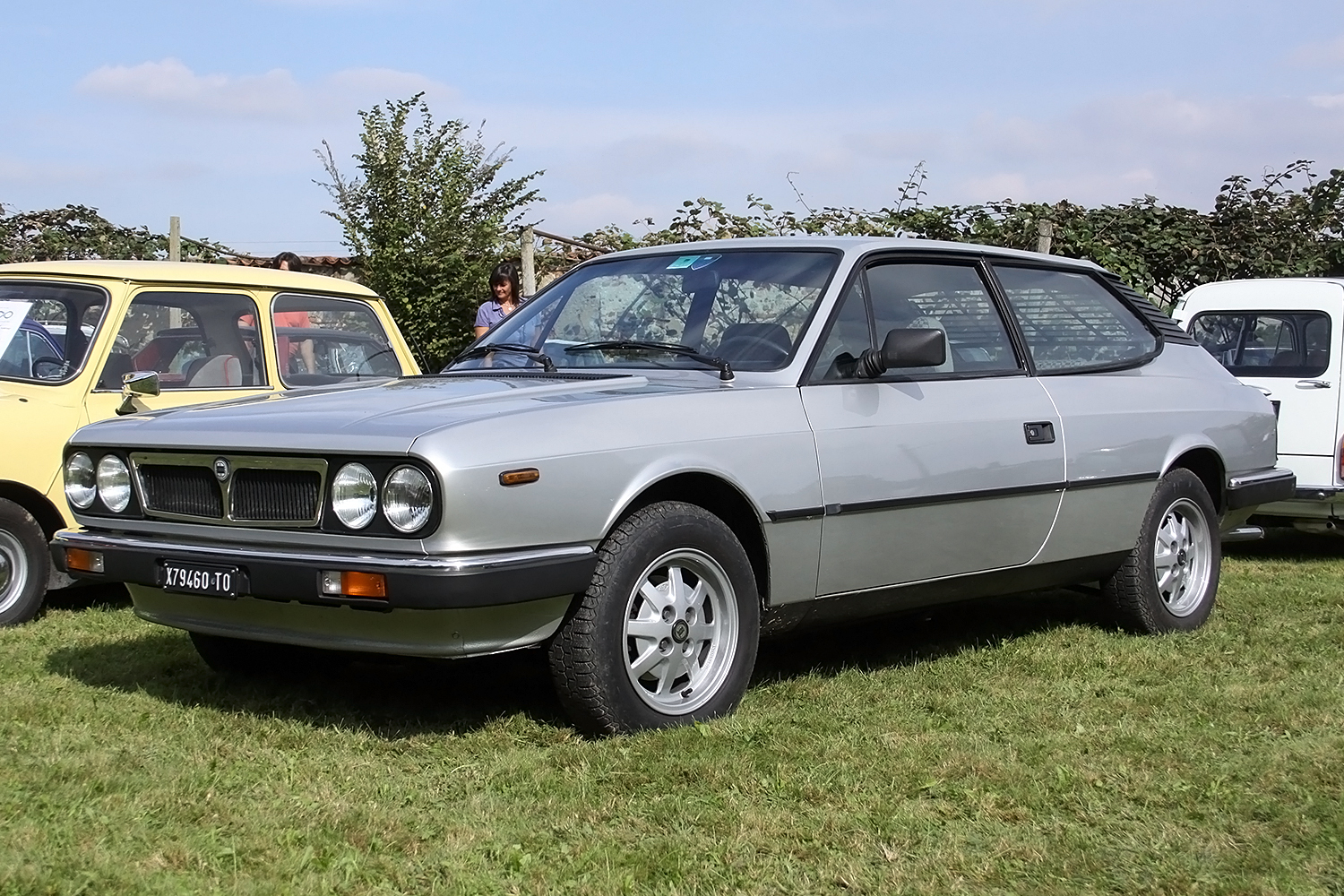
Lancia Beta HPE

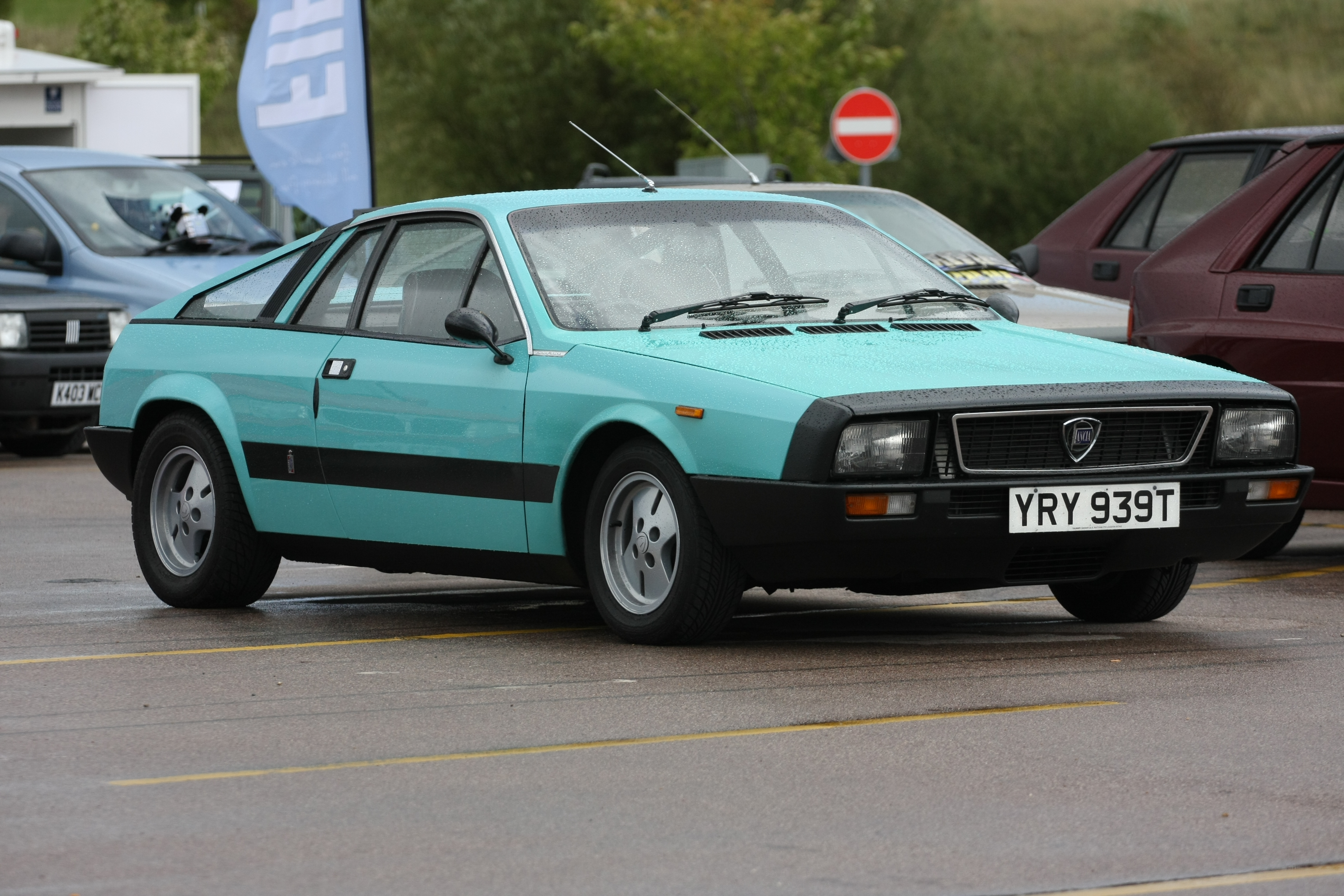
Lancia Beta Montecarlo

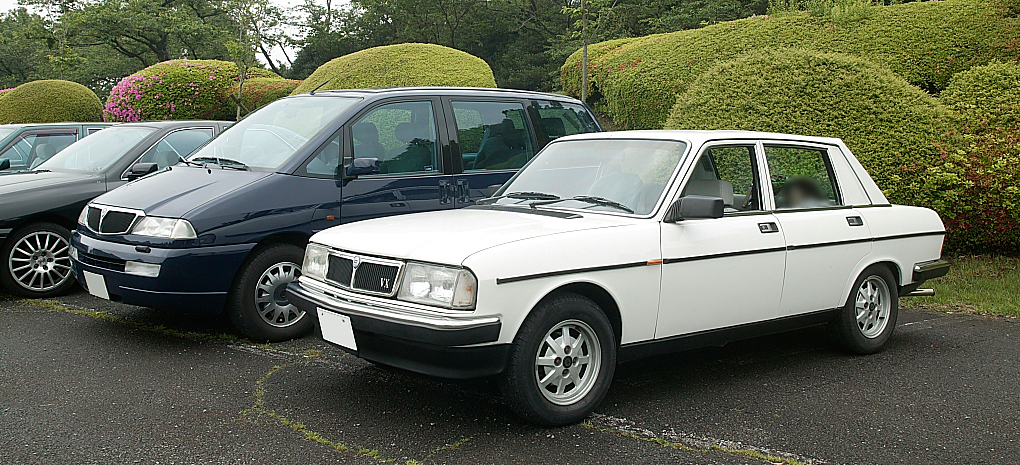
Lancia Trevi VX

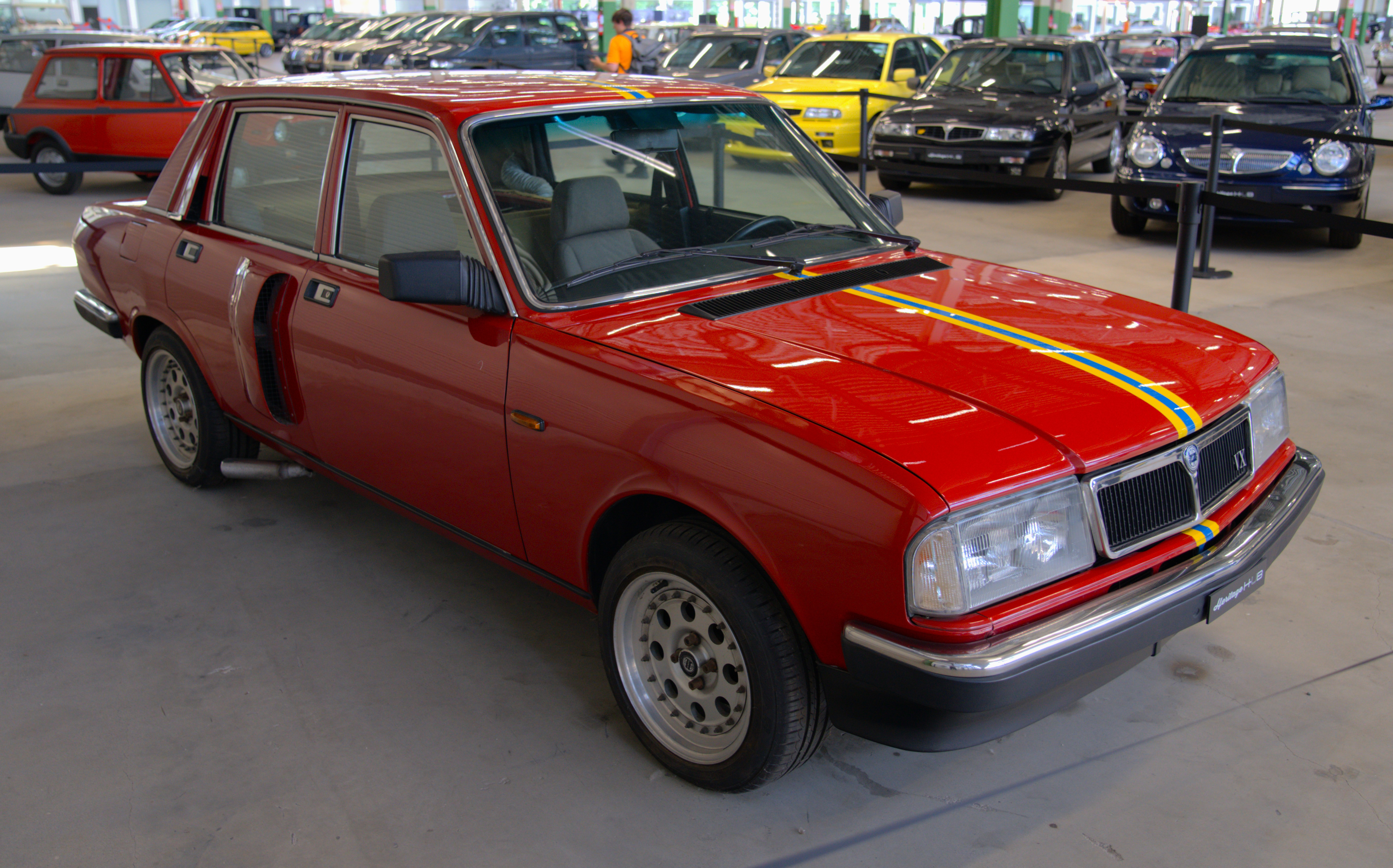
Lancia Trevi VX Bimotore
